= List of rove beetle (Staphylinidae) species recorded in Great Britain =

The following is a list of the rove beetles recorded in Great Britain. For other beetles, see List of beetle species recorded in Britain.

- Acidota crenata (Fabricius, 1793)
- Acidota cruentata Mannerheim, 1830
- Anthobium atrocephalum (Gyllenhal, 1827)
- Anthobium unicolor (Marsham, 1802)
- Anthophagus alpinus (Paykull, 1790)
- Anthophagus caraboides (Linnaeus, 1758)
- Deliphrum tectum (Paykull, 1789)
- Eucnecosum brachypterum (Gravenhorst, 1802)
- Geodromicus longipes (Mannerheim, 1830)
- Geodromicus nigrita (P. W. J. Müller, 1821)
- Lesteva hanseni Lohse, 1953
- Lesteva longoelytrata (Goeze, 1777)
- Lesteva monticola Kiesenwetter, 1847
- Lesteva pubescens Mannerheim, 1830
- Lesteva punctata Erichson, 1839
- Lesteva sicula Erichson, 1840
- Olophrum assimile (Paykull, 1800)
- Olophrum consimile (Gyllenhal, 1810)
- Olophrum fuscum (Gravenhorst, 1806)
- Olophrum piceum (Gyllenhal, 1810)
- Orochares angustatus (Erichson, 1840)
- Philorinum sordidum (Stephens, 1834)
- Phyllodrepoidea crenata Ganglbauer, 1895
- Coryphium angusticolle Stephens, 1834
- Eudectus whitei Sharp, 1871
- Eusphalerum luteum (Marsham, 1802)
- Eusphalerum minutum (Fabricius, 1792)
- Eusphalerum primulae (Stephens, 1834)
- Eusphalerum sorbi (Gyllenhal, 1810)
- Eusphalerum sorbicola (Kangas, 1941)
- Eusphalerum torquatum (Marsham, 1802)
- Hadrognathus longipalpis (Mulsant & Rey, 1851)
- Acrolocha minuta (Olivier, 1795)
- Acrolocha sulcula (Stephens, 1834)
- Acrulia inflata (Gyllenhal, 1813)
- Dropephylla devillei Bernhauer, 1902
- Dropephylla gracilicornis (Fairmaire & Laboulbène, 1856)
- Dropephylla heerii (Heer, 1841)
- Dropephylla ioptera (Stephens, 1832)
- Dropephylla koltzei Jászay & Hlavac, 2006
- Dropephylla vilis (Erichson, 1840)
- Hapalaraea pygmaea (Paykull, 1800)
- Hypopycna rufula (Erichson, 1840)
- Micralymma marinum (Ström, 1783)
- Omalium allardi Fairmaire & Brisout, 1859
- Omalium caesum Gravenhorst, 1806
- Omalium excavatum Stephens, 1834
- Omalium exiguum Gyllenhal, 1810
- Omalium italicum Bernhauer, 1902
- Omalium laeviusculum Gyllenhal, 1827
- Omalium laticolle Kraatz, 1858
- Omalium oxyacanthae Gravenhorst, 1806
- Omalium riparium C. G. Thomson, 1857
- Omalium rivulare (Paykull, 1789)
- Omalium rugatum Mulsant & Rey, 1880
- Omalium rugulipenne Rye, 1864
- Omalium septentrionis C. G. Thomson, 1856
- Paraphloeostiba gayndahensis (Macleay, 1873)
- Phloeonomus punctipennis C. G. Thomson, 1867
- Phloeonomus pusillus (Gravenhorst, 1806)
- Phloeostiba lapponica (Zetterstedt, 1838)
- Phloeostiba plana (Paykull, 1792)
- Phyllodrepa floralis (Paykull, 1789)
- Phyllodrepa nigra (Gravenhorst, 1806)
- Phyllodrepa puberula Bernhauer, 1903
- Phyllodrepa salicis (Gyllenhal, 1810)
- Xylodromus concinnus (Marsham, 1802)
- Xylodromus depressus (Gravenhorst, 1802)
- Xylodromus testaceus (Erichson, 1840)
- Xylostiba
  - Xylostiba bosnica (Bernhauer, 1902)
  - Xylostiba monilicornis (Gyllenhal, 1810)
- Megarthrus bellevoyei (Saulcy, 1862)
- Megarthrus denticollis (Beck, 1817)
- Megarthrus depressus (Paykull, 1789)
- Megarthrus hemipterus (Illiger, 1794)
- Megarthrus prosseni Schatzmayr, 1904
- Metopsia clypeata (P. W. J. Müller, 1821)
- Proteinus atomarius Erichson, 1840
- Proteinus brachypterus (Fabricius, 1792)
- Proteinus crenulatus Pandellé, 1867
- Proteinus laevigatus Hochhuth, 1871
- Proteinus ovalis Stephens, 1834
- Arrhenopeplus tesserula (Curtis, 1828)
- Micropeplus caelatus Erichson, 1839
- Micropeplus fulvus Erichson, 1840
- Micropeplus porcatus (Paykull, 1789)
- Micropeplus staphylinoides (Marsham, 1802)
- Batrisodes adnexus (Hampe, 1863)
- Batrisodes delaporti (Aubé, 1833)
- Batrisodes venustus (Reichenbach, 1816)
- Claviger longicornis P. W. J. Müller, 1818
- Claviger testaceus Preyssler, 1790
- Euplectus bescidicus Reitter, 1881
- Euplectus bonvouloiri Reitter, 1881
- Euplectus rosae Raffray, 1910
- Euplectus brunneus (Grimmer, 1841)
- Euplectus decipiens Raffray, 1910
- Euplectus duponti Aubé, 1833
- Euplectus infirmus Raffray, 1910
- Euplectus karstenii (Reichenbach, 1816)
- Euplectus kirbii Denny, 1825
- Euplectus mutator Fauvel, 1895
- Euplectus nanus (Reichenbach, 1816)
- Euplectus piceus Motschulsky, 1835
- Euplectus punctatus Mulsant, 1861
- Euplectus sanguineus Denny, 1825
- Euplectus signatus (Reichenbach, 1816)
- Euplectus tholini Guillebeau, 1888
- Plectophloeus erichsoni (Aubé, 1844)
- Plectophloeus occidentalis Besuchet, 1969
- Plectophloeus nitidus (Fairmaire, 1857)
- Bibloporus bicolor (Denny, 1825)
- Bibloporus minutus Raffray, 1914
- Bibloplectus ambiguus (Reichenbach, 1816)
- Bibloplectus delhermi Guillebeau, 1888
- Bibloplectus minutissimus (Aubé, 1833)
- Bibloplectus pusillus (Denny, 1825)
- Bibloplectus spinosus Raffray, 1914
- Bibloplectus tenebrosus (Reitter, 1880)
- Amauronyx maerkelii (Aubé, 1844)
- Trichonyx sulcicollis (Reichenbach, 1816)
- Trimium brevicorne (Reichenbach, 1816)
- Brachygluta fossulata (Reichenbach, 1816)
- Brachygluta haematica (Reichenbach, 1816)
- Brachygluta helferi (Schmidt-Göbel, 1836)
- Brachygluta pandellei (Saulcy, 1876)
- Brachygluta simplicior Raffray, 1904
- Brachygluta sinuata (Aubé, 1833)
- Brachygluta waterhousei (Rye, 1869)
- Fagniezia impressa (Panzer, 1803)
- Reichenbachia juncorum (Leach, 1817)
- Rybaxis longicornis (Leach, 1817)
- Bryaxis bulbifer (Reichenbach, 1816)
- Bryaxis curtisii (Leach, 1817)
- Bryaxis puncticollis (Denny, 1825)
- Bythinus burrellii Denny, 1825
- Bythinus macropalpus Aubé, 1833
- Tychobythinus glabratus (Rye, 1870)
- Tychus niger (Paykull, 1800)
- Tychus striola Guillebeau, 1888
- Pselaphaulax dresdensis (Herbst, 1792)
- Pselaphus heisei Herbst, 1792
- Phloeocharis subtilissima Mannerheim, 1830
- Bolitobius castaneus (Stephens, 1832)
- Bolitobius cingulatus (Mannerheim, 1830)
- Bryophacis crassicornis (Mäklin, 1847)
- Bryophacis rugipennis (Pandellé, 1869)
- Bryoporus cernuus (Gravenhorst, 1806)
- Ischnosoma longicorne (Mäklin, 1847)
- Ischnosoma splendidum (Gravenhorst, 1806)
- Lordithon exoletus (Erichson, 1839)
- Lordithon lunulatus (Linnaeus, 1761)
- Lordithon thoracicus (Fabricius, 1777)
- Lordithon trinotatus (Erichson, 1839)
- Mycetoporus angularis Mulsant & Rey, 1853
- Mycetoporus baudueri Mulsant & Rey, 1875
- Mycetoporus bimaculatus Boisduval & Lacordaire, 1835
- Mycetoporus clavicornis (Stephens, 1832)
- Mycetoporus despectus A. Strand, 1969
- Mycetoporus erichsonanus Fagel, 1965
- Mycetoporus lepidus (Gravenhorst, 1806)
- Mycetoporus longulus Mannerheim, 1830
- Mycetoporus monticola Fowler, 1888
- Mycetoporus nigricollis Stephens, 1835
- Mycetoporus piceolus Rey, 1883
- Mycetoporus punctus (Gravenhorst, 1806)
- Mycetoporus rufescens (Stephens, 1832)
- Parabolitobius inclinans (Gravenhorst, 1806)
- Cilea silphoides (Linnaeus, 1767)
- Lamprinodes saginatus (Gravenhorst, 1806)
- Sepedophilus bipunctatus (Gravenhorst, 1802)
- Sepedophilus constans (Fowler, 1888)
- Sepedophilus immaculatus (Stephens, 1832)
- Sepedophilus littoreus (Linnaeus, 1758)
- Sepedophilus lusitanicus Hammond, 1973
- Sepedophilus marshami (Stephens, 1832)
- Sepedophilus nigripennis (Stephens, 1832)
- Sepedophilus pedicularius (Gravenhorst, 1802)
- Sepedophilus testaceus (Fabricius, 1793)
- Tachinus bipustulatus (Fabricius, 1793)
- Tachinus corticinus Gravenhorst, 1802
- Tachinus elongatus Gyllenhal, 1810
- Tachinus flavolimbatus Pandellé, 1869
- Tachinus humeralis Gravenhorst, 1802
- Tachinus laticollis Gravenhorst, 1802
- Tachinus lignorum (Linnaeus, 1758)
- Tachinus marginellus (Fabricius, 1781)
- Tachinus pallipes (Gravenhorst, 1806)
- Tachinus proximus Kraatz, 1855
- Tachinus rufipennis Gyllenhal, 1810
- Tachinus rufipes (Linnaeus, 1758)
- Tachinus scapularis Stephens, 1832
- Tachinus subterraneus (Linnaeus, 1758)
- Tachyporus atriceps Stephens, 1832
- Tachyporus chrysomelinus (Linnaeus, 1758)
- Tachyporus dispar (Paykull, 1789)
- Tachyporus formosus A. H. Matthews, 1838
- Tachyporus hypnorum (Fabricius, 1775)
- Tachyporus nitidulus (Fabricius, 1781)
- Tachyporus obtusus (Linnaeus, 1767)
- Tachyporus pallidus Sharp, 1871
- Tachyporus pusillus Gravenhorst, 1806
- Tachyporus quadriscopulatus Pandellé, 1869
- Tachyporus scitulus Erichson, 1839
- Tachyporus solutus Erichson, 1839
- Tachyporus tersus Erichson, 1839
- Tachyporus transversalis Gravenhorst, 1806
- Trichophya pilicornis (Gyllenhal, 1810)
- Habrocerus capillaricornis (Gravenhorst, 1806)
- Actocharis readingii Sharp, 1870
- Aleochara brevipennis Gravenhorst, 1806
- Aleochara curtula (Goeze, 1777)
- Aleochara lata Gravenhorst, 1802
- Aleochara intricata Mannerheim, 1830
- Aleochara ruficornis Gravenhorst, 1802
- Aleochara bilineata Gyllenhal, 1810
- Aleochara binotata Kraatz, 1858
- Aleochara bipustulata (Linnaeus, 1761)
- Aleochara verna Say, 1836
- Aleochara obscurella Gravenhorst, 1806
- Aleochara phycophila Allen, 1937
- Aleochara grisea Kraatz, 1856
- Aleochara punctatella Motschulsky, 1858
- Aleochara spadicea (Erichson, 1837)
- Aleochara cuniculorum Kraatz, 1858
- Aleochara discipennis Mulsant & Rey, 1853
- Aleochara fumata Gravenhorst, 1802
- Aleochara funebris Wollaston, 1864
- Aleochara inconspicua Aubé, 1850
- Aleochara kamila Likovský, 1984
- Aleochara lanuginosa Gravenhorst, 1802
- Aleochara lygaea Kraatz, 1862
- Aleochara maculata Brisout, 1863
- Aleochara moerens Gyllenhal, 1827
- Aleochara moesta Gravenhorst, 1802
- Aleochara sanguinea (Linnaeus, 1758)
- Aleochara sparsa Heer, 1839
- Aleochara stichai Likovský, 1965
- Aleochara tristis Gravenhorst, 1806
- Aleochara villosa Mannerheim, 1830
- Tinotus morion (Gravenhorst, 1802)
- Acrotona aterrima (Gravenhorst, 1802)
- Acrotona benicki (Allen, 1940)
- Acrotona exigua (Erichson, 1837)
- Acrotona muscorum (Brisout, 1860)
- Acrotona obfuscata (Gravenhorst, 1802)
- Acrotona parens (Mulsant & Rey, 1852)
- Acrotona parvula (Mannerheim, 1830)
- Acrotona pseudotenera (Cameron, 1933)
- Acrotona pygmaea (Gravenhorst, 1802)
- Acrotona sylvicola (Kraatz, 1856)
- Acrotona troglodytes (Motschulsky, 1858)
- Adota maritima (Mannerheim, 1843)
- Alaobia gagatina (Baudi, 1848)
- Alaobia hybrida (Sharp, 1869)
- Alaobia linderi (Brisout, 1863)
- Alaobia pallidicornis (C. G. Thomson, 1856)
- Alaobia scapularis (C. R. Sahlberg, 1831)
- Alaobia sodalis (Erichson, 1837)
- Alaobia subglabra (Sharp, 1869)
- Alaobia taxiceroides Munster, 1932
- Alaobia trinotata (Kraatz, 1856)
- Alevonota aurantiaca Fauvel, 1895
- Alevonota egregia (Rye, 1876)
- Alevonota gracilenta (Erichson, 1839)
- Alevonota rufotestacea (Kraatz, 1856)
- Alianta incana (Erichson, 1837)
- Aloconota cambrica (Wollaston, 1855)
- Aloconota currax (Kraatz, 1856)
- Aloconota eichhoffi (Scriba, 1867)
- Aloconota gregaria (Erichson, 1839)
- Aloconota insecta (C. G. Thomson, 1856)
- Aloconota mihoki Bernhauer, 1913
- Aloconota planifrons (G. R. Waterhouse, 1864)
- Aloconota subgrandis Brundin, 1954
- Aloconota sulcifrons (Stephens, 1832)
- Aloconota coulsoni (Last, 1952)
- Aloconota languida (Erichson, 1837)
- Aloconota longicollis (Mulsant & Rey, 1852)
- Amidobia talpa (Heer, 1841)
- Amischa analis (Gravenhorst, 1802)
- Amischa bifoveolata (Mannerheim, 1830)
- Amischa decipiens (Sharp, 1869)
- Amischa forcipata Mulsant & Rey, 1873
- Amischa nigrofusca (Stephens, 1829)
- Anopleta corvina (C. G. Thomson, 1856)
- Anopleta kochi (Roubal, 1937)
- Anopleta puberula (Sharp, 1869)
- Anopleta soedermani (Bernhauer, 1931)
- Atheta aeneicollis (Sharp, 1869)
- Atheta aquatica (C. G. Thomson, 1852)
- Atheta aquatilis (C. G. Thomson, 1867)
- Atheta brunneipennis (C. G. Thomson, 1852)
- Atheta castanoptera (Mannerheim, 1830)
- Atheta ebenina (Mulsant & Rey, 1874)
- Atheta graminicola (Gravenhorst, 1806)
- Atheta heymesi Hubenthal, 1913
- Atheta hypnorum (Kiesenwetter, 1850)
- Atheta incognita (Sharp, 1869)
- Atheta laevicauda J. Sahlberg, 1876
  Atheta triangulum
- Atheta triangulum (Kraatz, 1856)
- Atheta xanthopus (C. G. Thomson, 1856)
- Atheta autumnalis (Erichson, 1839)
- Atheta basicornis (Mulsant & Rey, 1852)
- Atheta boletophila (C. G. Thomson, 1856)
- Atheta britanniae (Bernhauer & Scheerpeltz, 1926)
- Atheta crassicornis (Fabricius, 1793)
- Atheta diversa (Sharp, 1869)
- Atheta divisa (Märkel, 1844)
- Atheta euryptera (Stephens, 1832)
- Atheta fungicola (C. G. Thomson, 1852)
- Atheta harwoodi (Williams, 1930)
- Atheta intermedia (C. G. Thomson, 1852)
- Atheta liturata (Stephens, 1832)
- Atheta nidicola (Johansen, 1914)
- Atheta nigritula (Gravenhorst, 1802)
- Atheta oblita (Erichson, 1839)
- Atheta paracrassicornis Brundin, 1954
- Atheta pilicornis (C. G. Thomson, 1852)
- Atheta procera (Kraatz, 1856)
- Atheta ravilla (Erichson, 1839)
- Atheta strandiella (Brundin, 1954)
- Atheta vaga (Heer, 1839)
- Badura macrocera (C. G. Thomson, 1856)
- Badura puncticollis (Benick, 1938)
- Bessobia excellens (Kraatz, 1856)
- Bessobia fungivora (C. G. Thomson, 1867)
- Bessobia monticola (C. G. Thomson, 1852)
- Bessobia occulta (Erichson, 1837)
- Boreophilia eremita (Rye, 1866)
- Brundinia marina (Mulsant & Rey, 1853)
- Brundinia meridionalis (Mulsant & Rey, 1853)
- Cadaverota cadaverina (Brisout, 1860)
- Cadaverota hansseni (Strand, 1943)
- Callicerus obscurus Gravenhorst, 1802
- Callicerus rigidicornis (Erichson, 1839)
- Ceritaxa dilaticornis (Kraatz, 1856)
- Ceritaxa pervagata (Benick, 1974)
- Ceritaxa testaceipes (Heer, 1839)
- Chaetida longicornis (Gravenhorst, 1802)
- Coprothassa melanaria (Mannerheim, 1830)
- Dadobia immersa (Erichson, 1837)
- Dalotia coriaria (Kraatz, 1856)
- Datomicra canescens (Sharp, 1869)
- Datomicra celata (Erichson, 1837)
- Datomicra dadopora (C. G. Thomson, 1867)
- Datomicra nigra (Kraatz, 1856)
- Datomicra sordidula (Erichson, 1837)
- Datomicra zosterae (C. G. Thomson, 1856)
- Dilacra luteipes (Erichson, 1837)
- Dilacra vilis (Erichson, 1837)
- Dimetrota aeneipennis (C. G. Thomson, 1856)
- Dimetrota atramentaria (Gyllenhal, 1810)
- Dimetrota cauta (Erichson, 1837)
- Dimetrota cinnamoptera (C. G. Thomson, 1856)
- Dimetrota ischnocera (C. G. Thomson, 1870)
- Dimetrota laevana (Mulsant & Rey, 1852)
- Dimetrota marcida (Erichson, 1837)
- Dimetrota nigripes (C. G. Thomson, 1856)
- Dimetrota setigera (Sharp, 1869)
- Dinaraea aequata (Erichson, 1837)
- Dinaraea angustula (Gyllenhal, 1810)
- Dinaraea linearis (Gravenhorst, 1802)
- Dochmonota clancula (Erichson, 1837)
- Enalodroma hepatica (Erichson, 1839)
- Geostiba circellaris (Gravenhorst, 1806)
- Halobrecta algae (Hardy, 1851)
- Halobrecta algophila (Fenyes, 1909)
- Halobrecta flavipes C. G. Thomson, 1861
- Halobrecta princeps (Sharp, 1869)
- Hydrosmecta delicatissima (Bernhauer, 1908)
- Hydrosmecta delicatula (Sharp, 1869)
- Hydrosmecta eximia (Sharp, 1869)
- Hydrosmecta fragilis (Kraatz, 1854)
- Hydrosmecta longula (Heer, 1839)
- Hydrosmecta subtilissima (Kraatz, 1854)
- Liogluta alpestris (Heer, 1839)
- Liogluta granigera (Kiesenwetter, 1850)
- Liogluta longiuscula (Gravenhorst, 1802)
- Liogluta microptera C. G. Thomson, 1867
- Liogluta pagana (Erichson, 1839)
- Lyprocorrhe anceps (Erichson, 1837)
- Microdota aegra (Heer, 1841)
- Microdota amicula (Stephens, 1832)
- Microdota atomaria (Kraatz, 1856)
- Microdota atricolor (Sharp, 1869)
- Microdota benickiella (Brundin, 1948)
- Microdota boreella (Brundin, 1948)
- Microdota excelsa (Bernhauer, 1911)
- Microdota glabricula (C. G. Thomson, 1867)
- Microdota indubia (Sharp, 1869)
- Microdota inquinula (Gravenhorst, 1802)
- Microdota liliputana (Brisout, 1860)
- Microdota minuscula (Brisout, 1860)
- Microdota palleola (Erichson, 1837)
- Microdota spatuloides (Benick, 1939)
- Microdota subtilis (Scriba, 1866)
- Mocyta amplicollis (Mulsant & Rey, 1873)
- Mocyta clientula (Erichson, 1839)
- Mocyta fungi (Gravenhorst, 1806)
- Mocyta fussi (Bernhauer, 1908)
- Mocyta orbata (Erichson, 1837)
- Mocyta orphana (Erichson, 1837)
- Mycetota fimorum (Brisout, 1860)
- Mycetota laticollis (Stephens, 1832)
- Nehemitropia lividipennis (Mannerheim, 1830)
- Neohilara subterranea (Mulsant & Rey, 1853)
- Notothecta confusa (Märkel, 1844)
- Notothecta flavipes (Gravenhorst, 1806)
- Oreostiba tibialis (Heer, 1839)
- Ousipalia caesula (Erichson, 1839)
- Pachnida nigella (Erichson, 1837)
- Pachyatheta cribrata (Kraatz, 1856)
- Pachyatheta mortuorum (C. G. Thomson, 1867)
- Parameotica difficilis (Brisout, 1860)
- Paranopleta inhabilis (Kraatz, 1856)
- Philhygra arctica (C. G. Thomson, 1856)
- Philhygra britteni Joy, 1913
- Philhygra debilis (Erichson, 1837)
- Philhygra deformis (Kraatz, 1856)
- Philhygra elongatula (Gravenhorst, 1802)
- Philhygra fallaciosa (Sharp, 1869)
- Philhygra gyllenhalii (C. G. Thomson, 1856)
- Philhygra hygrobia (C. G. Thomson, 1856)
- Philhygra hygrotopora (Kraatz, 1856)
- Philhygra luridipennis (Mannerheim, 1830)
- Philhygra malleus (Joy, 1913)
- Philhygra melanocera (C. G. Thomson, ?
- Philhygra obtusangula (Joy, 1913)
- Philhygra palustris (Kiesenwetter, 1844)
- Philhygra parca (Mulsant & Rey, 1873)
- Philhygra scotica (Elliman, 1909)
- Philhygra terminalis (Gravenhorst, 1806)
- Philhygra volans (Scriba, 1859)
- Plataraea brunnea (Fabricius, 1798)
- Pycnota paradoxa (Mulsant & Rey, 1861)
- Rhagocneme subsinuata (Erichson, 1839)
- Schistoglossa aubei (Brisout, 1860)
- Schistoglossa bergvalli Palm, 1968
- Schistoglossa curtipennis (Sharp, 1869)
- Schistoglossa gemina (Erichson, 1837)
- Schistoglossa viduata (Erichson, 1837)
- Thinobaena vestita (Gravenhorst, 1806)
- Traumoecia picipes (C. G. Thomson, ?
- Trichiusa immigrata Lohse, 1984
- Xenota myrmecobia (Kraatz, 1856)
- Thamiaraea cinnamomea (Gravenhorst, 1802)
- Thamiaraea hospita (Märkel, 1844)
- Autalia impressa (Olivier, 1795)
- Autalia longicornis Scheerpeltz, 1947
- Autalia puncticollis Sharp, 1864
- Autalia rivularis (Gravenhorst, 1802)
- Deinopsis erosa (Stephens, 1832)
- Diglotta mersa (Haliday, 1837)
- Diglotta sinuaticollis (Mulsant & Rey, 1871)
- Bohemiellina flavipennis (Cameron, 1920)
- Borboropora kraatzii Fuss in Kraatz & Fuss, 1862
- Cordalia obscura (Gravenhorst, 1802)
- Falagria caesa Erichson, 1837
- Falagria sulcatula (Gravenhorst, 1806)
- Falagrioma thoracica (Stephens, 1832)
- Myrmecocephalus concinnus (Erichson, 1839)
- Myrmecopora brevipes Butler, 1909
- Myrmecopora oweni Assing, 1997
- Myrmecopora sulcata (Kiesenwetter, 1850)
- Myrmecopora uvida (Erichson, 1840)
- Gymnusa brevicollis (Paykull, 1800)
- Gymnusa variegata Kiesenwetter, 1845
- Bolitochara bella Märkel, 1844
- Bolitochara lucida (Gravenhorst, 1802)
- Bolitochara mulsanti Sharp, 1875
- Bolitochara obliqua Erichson, 1837
- Bolitochara pulchra (Gravenhorst, 1806)
- Euryusa optabilis Heer, 1839
- Euryusa sinuata Erichson, 1837
- Leptusa fumida (Erichson, 1839)
- Leptusa norvegica A. Strand, 1941
- Leptusa pulchella (Mannerheim, 1830)
- Leptusa ruficollis (Erichson, 1839)
- Heterota plumbea (G. R. Waterhouse, 1858)
- Pseudomicrodota paganettii (Bernhauer, 1909)
- Pseudopasilia testacea (Brisout, 1863)
- Rhopalocerina clavigera (Scriba, 1859)
- Tachyusida gracilis (Erichson, 1837)
- Thecturota marchii (Dodero, 1922)
- Thecturota williamsi (Bernhauer, 1936)
- Agaricochara latissima (Stephens, 1832)
- Brachida exigua (Heer, 1839)
- Encephalus complicans Stephens, 1832
- Gyrophaena affinis Mannerheim, 1830
- Gyrophaena bihamata C. G. Thomson, 1867
- Gyrophaena congrua Erichson, 1837
- Gyrophaena fasciata (Marsham, 1802)
- Gyrophaena gentilis Erichson, 1839
- Gyrophaena hanseni A. Strand, 1946
- Gyrophaena joyi Wendeler, 1924
- Gyrophaena joyioides Wüsthoff, 1937
- Gyrophaena lucidula Erichson, 1837
- Gyrophaena manca Erichson, 1839
- Gyrophaena minima Erichson, 1837
- Gyrophaena munsteri A. Strand, 1935
- Gyrophaena nana (Paykull, 1800)
- Gyrophaena poweri Crotch, 1867
- Gyrophaena pseudonana A. Strand, 1939
- Gyrophaena pulchella Heer, 1839
- Gyrophaena rousi Dvorák, 1966
- Gyrophaena strictula Erichson, 1839
- Gyrophaena williamsi A. Strand, 1935
- Anomognathus cuspidatus (Erichson, 1839)
- Cyphea curtula (Erichson, 1837)
- Homalota plana (Gyllenhal, 1810)
- Silusa rubiginosa Erichson, 1837
- Hygronoma dimidiata (Gravenhorst, 1806)
- Cypha apicalis (Brisout, 1863)
- Cypha aprilis (Rey, 1882)
- Cypha discoidea (Erichson, 1839)
- Cypha laeviuscula (Mannerheim, 1830)
- Cypha longicornis (Paykull, 1800)
- Cypha pulicaria (Erichson, 1839)
- Cypha punctum (Motschulsky, 1857)
- Cypha seminulum (Erichson, 1839)
- Cypha tarsalis (Luze, 1902)
- Holobus flavicornis (Lacordaire, 1835)
- Oligota apicata (Erichson, 1837)
- Oligota granaria Erichson, 1837
- Oligota inflata (Mannerheim, 1830)
- Oligota parva Kraatz, 1862
- Oligota picipes (Stephens, 1832)
- Oligota pumilio Kiesenwetter, 1858
- Oligota punctulata Heer, 1839
- Oligota pusillima (Gravenhorst, 1806)
- Lomechusa emarginata (Paykull, 1789)
- Lomechusa paradoxa Gravenhorst, 1806
- Lomechusoides strumosus (Fabricius, 1775)
- Drusilla canaliculata (Fabricius, 1787)
- Myrmoecia plicata (Erichson, 1837)
- Pella cognata (Märkel, 1842)
- Pella funesta (Gravenhorst, 1806)
- Pella humeralis (Gravenhorst, 1802)
- Pella laticollis (Märkel, 1845)
- Pella limbata (Paykull, 1789)
- Pella lugens (Gravenhorst, 1802)
- Zyras collaris (Märkel, 1842)
- Zyras haworthi Stephens, 1835
- Myllaena brevicornis (A. H. Matthews, 1838)
- Myllaena dubia (Gravenhorst, 1806)
- Myllaena elongata (A. H. Matthews, 1838)
- Myllaena fowleri A. Matthews, 1883
- Myllaena gracilicornis Fairmaire & Brisout, 1859
- Myllaena gracilis (A. H. Matthews, 1838)
- Myllaena infuscata Kraatz, 1853
- Myllaena intermedia Erichson, 1837
- Myllaena kraatzi Sharp, 1871
- Myllaena masoni A. Matthews, 1883
- Myllaena minuta (Gravenhorst, 1806)
- Dinarda dentata (Gravenhorst, 1806)
- Dinarda hagensi Wasmann, 1889
- Dinarda maerkeli Kiesenwetter, 1843
- Dinarda pygmaea Wasmann, 1894
- Homoeusa acuminata (Märkel, 1842)
- Meotica anglica Benick in Muona, 1991
- Meotica exilis (Knoch in Gravenhorst, 1806)
- Meotica exillima Sharp, 1915
- Meotica filiformis (Motschulsky, 1860)
- Meotica pallens (Redtenbacher, 1849)
- Amarochara bonnairei (Fauvel, 1865)
- Amarochara forticornis (Boisduval & Lacordaire, 1835)
- Amarochara umbrosa (Erichson, 1837)
- Calodera aethiops (Gravenhorst, 1802)
- Calodera nigrita Mannerheim, 1830
- Calodera protensa Mannerheim, 1830
- Calodera riparia Erichson, 1837
- Calodera rubens (Erichson, 1837)
- Calodera rufescens Kraatz, 1856
- Calodera uliginosa Erichson, 1837
- Cousya defecta Mulsant & Rey, 1875
- Cousya longitarsis (C. G. Thomson, 1867)
- Cousya nigrata (Fairmaire & Laboulbène, 1856)
- Cousya nitidiventris (Fagel, 1958)
- Crataraea suturalis (Mannerheim, 1830)
- Dexiogyia corticina (Erichson, 1837)
- Haploglossa gentilis (Märkel, 1844)
- Haploglossa marginalis (Gravenhorst, 1806)
- Haploglossa nidicola (Fairmaire, 1852)
- Haploglossa picipennis (Gyllenhal, 1827)
- Haploglossa villosula (Stephens, 1832)
- Hygropora cunctans (Erichson, 1837)
- Ilyobates bennetti Donisthorpe, 1914
- Ilyobates nigricollis (Paykull, 1800)
- Ilyobates propinquus (Aubé, 1850)
- Ischnoglossa obscura Wunderle, 1990
- Ischnoglossa prolixa (Gravenhorst, 1802)
- Ischnoglossa turcica Wunderle, 1992
- Mniusa incrassata (Mulsant & Rey, 1852)
- Ocalea badia Erichson, 1837
- Ocalea latipennis Sharp, 1870
- Ocalea picata (Stephens, 1832)
- Ocalea rivularis L. Miller, 1851
- Ocyusa maura (Erichson, 1837)
- Ocyusa picina (Aubé, 1850)
- Oxypoda acuminata (Stephens, 1832)
- Oxypoda alternans (Gravenhorst, 1802)
- Oxypoda annularis Mannerheim, 1830
- Oxypoda brachyptera (Stephens, 1832)
- Oxypoda brevicornis (Stephens, 1832)
- Oxypoda carbonaria (Heer, 1841)
- Oxypoda elongatula Aubé, 1850
- Oxypoda exoleta Erichson, 1839
- Oxypoda ferruginea Erichson, 1839
- Oxypoda flavicornis Kraatz, 1856
- Oxypoda formiceticola Märkel, 1841
- Oxypoda haemorrhoa (Mannerheim, 1830)
- Oxypoda induta Mulsant & Rey, 1861
- Oxypoda islandica Kraatz, 1857
- Oxypoda lentula Erichson, 1837
- Oxypoda longipes Mulsant & Rey, 1861
- Oxypoda lurida Wollaston, 1857
- Oxypoda mutata Sharp, 1871
- Oxypoda nigricornis Motschulsky, 1860
- Oxypoda nigrocincta Mulsant & Rey, 1875
- Oxypoda opaca (Gravenhorst, 1802)
- Oxypoda praecox Erichson, 1839
- Oxypoda procerula Mannerheim, 1830
- Oxypoda recondita Kraatz, 1856
- Oxypoda soror C. G. Thomson, 1855
- Oxypoda spectabilis Märkel, 1844
- Oxypoda tarda Sharp, 1871
- Oxypoda tirolensis Gredler, 1863
- Oxypoda vittata Märkel, 1842
- Phloeopora concolor Kraatz, 1856
- Phloeopora corticalis (Gravenhorst, 1802)
- Phloeopora nitidiventris Fauvel, 1904
- Phloeopora scribae Eppelsheim, 1884
- Phloeopora testacea (Mannerheim, 1830)
- Stichoglossa semirufa (Erichson, 1839)
- Tetralaucopora longitarsis (Erichson, 1837)
- Tetralaucopora rubicunda (Erichson, 1837)
- Thiasophila angulata (Erichson, 1837)
- Thiasophila inquilina (Märkel, 1842)
- Brachyusa concolor (Erichson, 1839)
- Dacrila fallax (Kraatz, 1856)
- Dacrila pruinosa (Kraatz, 1856)
- Dasygnypeta velata (Erichson, 1837)
- Gnypeta caerulea (C. R. Sahlberg, 1831)
- Gnypeta carbonaria (Mannerheim, 1830)
- Gnypeta ripicola (Kiesenwetter, 1844)
- Gnypeta rubrior Tottenham, 1939
- Ischnopoda leucopus (Marsham, 1802)
- Ischnopoda scitula (Erichson, 1837)
- Ischnopoda umbratica (Erichson, 1837)
- Tachyusa coarctata (Erichson, 1837)
- Tachyusa constricta (Erichson, 1837)
- Tachyusa objecta (Mulsant & Rey, 1870)
- Thinonoma atra (Gravenhorst, 1806)
- Arena tabida (Kiesenwetter, 1850)
- Phytosus balticus Kraatz, 1859
- Phytosus nigriventris (Chevrolat, 1843)
- Phytosus spinifer Curtis, 1838
- Placusa complanata Erichson, 1839
- Placusa depressa Mäklin, 1845
- Placusa pumilio (Gravenhorst, 1802)
- Placusa tachyporoides (Waltl, 1838)
- Scaphidium quadrimaculatum Olivier, 1790
- Scaphium immaculatum (Olivier, 1790)
- Scaphisoma agaricinum (Linnaeus, 1758)
- Scaphisoma assimile Erichson, 1845
- Scaphisoma boleti (Panzer, 1793)
- Siagonium quadricorne Kirby, 1815
- Coprophilus striatulus (Fabricius, 1793)
- Deleaster dichrous (Gravenhorst, 1802)
- Syntomium aeneum (P. W. J. Müller, 1821)
- Anotylus clypeonitens (Pandellé, 1867)
- Anotylus complanatus (Erichson, 1839)
- Anotylus fairmairei (Pandellé, 1867)
- Anotylus hamatus (Fairmaire & Laboulbène, 1856)
- Anotylus insecatus (Gravenhorst, 1806)
- Anotylus inustus (Gravenhorst, 1806)
- Anotylus maritimus C. G. Thomson, 1861
- Anotylus mutator (Lohse, 1963)
- Anotylus nitidulus (Gravenhorst, 1802)
- Anotylus rugosus (Fabricius, 1775)
- Anotylus saulcyi (Pandellé, 1867)
- Anotylus sculpturatus (Gravenhorst, 1806)
- Anotylus tetracarinatus (Block, 1799)
- Oxytelus fulvipes Erichson, 1839
- Oxytelus laqueatus (Marsham, 1802)
- Oxytelus migrator Fauvel, 1904
- Oxytelus piceus (Linnaeus, 1767)
- Oxytelus sculptus Gravenhorst, 1806
- Platystethus alutaceus C. G. Thomson, 1861
- Platystethus capito Heer, 1839
- Platystethus cornutus (Gravenhorst, 1802)
- Platystethus degener Mulsant & Rey, 1878
- Platystethus nitens (C. R. Sahlberg, 1832)
- Platystethus nodifrons Mannerheim, 1830
- Platystethus arenarius (Fourcroy, 1785)
- Aploderus caelatus (Gravenhorst, 1802)
- Bledius subterraneus Erichson, 1839
- Bledius limicola Tottenham, 1940
- Bledius spectabilis Kraatz, 1857
- Bledius tricornis (Herbst, 1784)
- Bledius unicornis (Germar, 1825)
- Bledius fergussoni Joy, 1912
- Bledius subniger Schneider, 1900
- Bledius bicornis (Germar, 1822)
- Bledius jutlandensis Herman, 1986
- Bledius diota Schiødte, 1866
- Bledius furcatus (Olivier, 1811)
- Bledius annae Sharp, 1911
- Bledius arcticus J. Sahlberg, 1890
- Bledius atricapillus (Germar, 1825)
- Bledius crassicollis Lacordaire, 1835
- Bledius defensus Fauvel, 1872
- Bledius dissimilis Erichson, 1840
- Bledius erraticus Erichson, 1839
- Bledius femoralis (Gyllenhal, 1827)
- Bledius filipes Sharp, 1911
- Bledius fuscipes Rye, 1865
- Bledius gallicus (Gravenhorst, 1806)
- Bledius longulus Erichson, 1839
- Bledius occidentalis Bondroit, 1907
- Bledius opacus (Block, 1799)
- Bledius pallipes (Gravenhorst, 1806)
- Bledius praetermissus Williams, 1929
- Bledius terebrans (Schiødte, 1866)
- Carpelimus bilineatus Stephens, 1834
- Carpelimus corticinus (Gravenhorst, 1806)
- Carpelimus despectus (Baudi, 1869)
- Carpelimus elongatulus (Erichson, 1839)
- Carpelimus foveolatus (C. R. Sahlberg, 1832)
- Carpelimus fuliginosus (Gravenhorst, 1802)
- Carpelimus gracilis (Mannerheim, 1830)
- Carpelimus halophilus (Kiesenwetter, 1844)
- Carpelimus impressus (Boisduval & Lacordaire, 1835)
- Carpelimus lindrothi Palm, 1942
- Carpelimus manchuricus (Bernhauer, 1938)
- Carpelimus obesus (Kiesenwetter, 1844)
- Carpelimus pusillus (Gravenhorst, 1802)
- Carpelimus rivularis (Motschulsky, 1860)
- Carpelimus schneideri (Ganglbauer, 1895)
- Carpelimus similis Smetana, 1967
- Carpelimus subtilis (Erichson, 1839)
- Carpelimus zealandicus (Sharp, 1900)
- Manda mandibularis (Gyllenhal, 1827)
- Ochthephilus andalusiacus (Fagel, 1957)
- Ochthephilus angustior (Bernhauer, 1943)
- Ochthephilus aureus (Fauvel, 1871)
- Ochthephilus omalinus (Erichson, 1840)
- Planeustomus flavicollis Fauvel, 1871
- Planeustomus palpalis (Erichson, 1839)
- Teropalpus unicolor (Sharp, 1900)
- Thinobius bicolor Joy, 1911
- Thinobius brevipennis Kiesenwetter, 1850
- Thinobius ciliatus Kiesenwetter, 1844
- Thinobius crinifer Smetana, 1959
- Thinobius longipennis (Heer, 1841)
- Thinobius major Kraatz, 1857
- Thinobius newberyi Scheerpeltz, 1925
- Thinodromus arcuatus (Stephens, 1834)
- Oxyporus rufus (Linnaeus, 1758)
- Dianous coerulescens (Gyllenhal, 1810)
- Stenus aceris Stephens, 1833
- Stenus fuscicornis Erichson, 1840
- Stenus geniculatus Gravenhorst, 1806
- Stenus glacialis Heer, 1839
- Stenus impressus Germar, 1824
- Stenus longitarsis Skeetle Beetle
- Stenus ludyi Fauvel, 1855
- Stenus ochropus Kiesenwetter, 1858
- Stenus ossium Stephens, 1833
- Stenus pallipes Gravenhorst, 1802
- Stenus palustris Erichson, 1839
- Stenus subaeneus Erichson, 1840
- Stenus cicindeloides (Schaller, 1783)
- Stenus fornicatus Stephens, 1833
- Stenus fulvicornis Stephens, 1833
- Stenus kiesenwetteri Rosenhauer, 1856
- Stenus latifrons Erichson, 1839
- Stenus oscillator Rye, 1870
- Stenus similis (Herbst, 1784)
- Stenus solutus Erichson, 1840
- Stenus tarsalis Ljungh, 1810
- Metastenus bifoveolatus Gyllenhal, 1827
- Metastenus binotatus Ljungh, 1804
- Metastenus brevipennis C. G. Thomson, 1851
- Metastenus butrintensis Smetana, 1959
- Metastenus canescens Rosenhauer, 1856
- Metastenus flavipes Stephens, 1833
- Metastenus nitidiusculus Stephens, 1833
- Metastenus niveus Fauvel, 1865
- Metastenus pallitarsis Stephens, 1833
- Metastenus picipennis Erichson, 1840
- Metastenus picipes Stephens, 1833
- Metastenus pubescens Stephens, 1833
- Metastenus umbratilis Casey, 1884
- Metastenus argus Gravenhorst, 1806
- Metastenus asphaltinus Erichson, 1840
- Metastenus assequens Rey, 1844
- Metastenus ater Mannerheim, 1830
- Metastenus atratulus Erichson, 1839
- Metastenus biguttatus (Linnaeus, 1758)
- Metastenus bimaculatus Gyllenhal, 1810
- Metastenus boops Ljungh, 1810
- Metastenus calcaratus Scriba, 1864
- Metastenus canaliculatus Gyllenhal, 1827
- Metastenus carbonarius Gyllenhal, 1827
- Metastenus circularis Gravenhorst, 1802
- Metastenus clavicornis (Scopoli, 1763)
- Metastenus comma LeConte, 1863
- Metastenus contumax Assing, 1994
- Metastenus europaeus Puthz, 1966
- Metastenus fossulatus Erichson, 1840
- Metastenus fuscipes Gravenhorst, 1802
- Metastenus glabellus C. G. Thomson, 1870
- Metastenus guttula P. W. J. Müller, 1821
- Metastenus guynemeri Jacquelin du Val, 1850
- Metastenus incanus Erichson, 1839
- Metastenus incrassatus Erichson, 1839
- Metastenus juno (Paykull, 1789)
- Metastenus longitarsis C. G. Thomson, 1851
- Metastenus lustrator Erichson, 1839
- Metastenus melanarius Stephens, 1833
- Metastenus melanopus (Marsham, 1802)
- Metastenus morio Gravenhorst, 1806
- Metastenus nanus Stephens, 1833
- Metastenus nitens Stephens, 1833
- Metastenus palposus Zetterstedt, 1838
- Metastenus proditor Erichson, 1839
- Metastenus providus Erichson, 1839
- Metastenus pusillus Stephens, 1833
- Metastenus subdepressus Mulsant & Rey, 1861
- Metastenus brunnipes Stephens, 1833
- Metastenus crassus Stephens, 1833
- Metastenus formicetorum Mannerheim, 1843
- Metastenus nigritulus Gyllenhal, 1827
- Metastenus opticus Gravenhorst, 1806
- Euaesthetus bipunctatus (Ljungh, 1804)
- Euaesthetus laeviusculus Mannerheim, 1844
- Euaesthetus ruficapillus Lacordaire, 1835
- Pseudopsis sulcata Newman, 1834
- Achenium depressum (Gravenhorst, 1802)
- Achenium humile (Nicolai, 1822)
- Astenus procerus (Gravenhorst, 1806)
- Astenus pulchellus (Heer, 1839)
- Astenus serpentinus (Motschulsky, 1858)
- Astenus immaculatus Stephens, 1833
- Astenus lyonessius (Joy, 1908)
- Hypomedon debilicornis (Wollaston, 1857)
- Lathrobium brunnipes (Fabricius, 1793)
- Lathrobium dilutum Erichson, 1839
- Lathrobium elongatum (Linnaeus, 1767)
- Lathrobium fovulum Stephens, 1833
- Lathrobium fulvipenne (Gravenhorst, 1806)
- Lathrobium geminum Kraatz, 1857
- Lathrobium impressum Heer, 1841
- Lathrobium longulum Gravenhorst, 1802
- Lathrobium pallidipenne Hochhuth, 1851
- Lathrobium pallidum Nordmann, 1837
- Lathrobium rufipenne Gyllenhal, 1813
- Lathrobium angusticolle Boisduval & Lacordaire, 1835
- Lathrobium angustatum Boisduval & Lacordaire, 1835
- Lathrobium quadratum (Paykull, 1789)
- Lathrobium rufonitidum Reitter, 1909
- Lathrobium terminatum Gravenhorst, 1802
- Lathrobium zetterstedti Rye, 1872
- Lithocharis nigriceps Kraatz, 1859
- Lithocharis ochracea (Gravenhorst, 1802)
- Lobrathium multipunctum (Gravenhorst, 1802)
- Medon apicalis (Kraatz, 1857)
- Medon brunneus (Erichson, 1839)
- Medon castaneus (Gravenhorst, 1802)
- Medon dilutus (Erichson, 1839)
- Medon fusculus (Mannerheim, 1830)
- Medon piceus (Kraatz, 1858)
- Medon pocofer (Peyron, 1857)
- Medon ripicola (Kraatz, 1854)
- Ochthephilum collare (Reitter, 1884)
- Ochthephilum fracticorne (Paykull, 1800)
- Ochthephilum jacquelini (Boieldieu, 1859)
- Paederidus rubrothoracicus (Goeze, 1777)
- Paederus caligatus Erichson, 1840
- Paederus fuscipes Curtis, 1826
- Paederus littoralis Gravenhorst, 1802
- Paederus riparius (Linnaeus, 1758)
- Pseudomedon obscurellus (Erichson, 1840)
- Pseudomedon obsoletus (Nordmann, 1837)
- Rugilus angustatus Geoffroy, 1785)
- Rugilus erichsoni (Fauvel, 1867)
- Rugilus geniculatus (Erichson, 1839)
- Rugilus orbiculatus (Paykull, 1789)
- Rugilus rufipes Germar, 1836
- Rugilus similis (Erichson, 1839)
- Rugilus subtilis (Erichson, 1840)
- Scopaeus gracilis (Sperk, 1835)
- Scopaeus laevigatus (Gyllenhal, 1827)
- Scopaeus minutus Erichson, 1840
- Scopaeus ryei Wollaston, 1872
- Scopaeus sulcicollis (Stephens, 1833)
- Sunius bicolor (Olivier, 1795)
- Sunius melanocephalus (Fabricius, 1793)
- Sunius propinquus (Brisout, 1867)
- Atrecus affinis (Paykull, 1789)
- Othius angustus Stephens, 1833
- Othius laeviusculus Stephens, 1833
- Othius lapidicola Märkel & Kiesenwetter, 1848
- Othius punctulatus (Goeze, 1777)
- Othius subuliformis Stephens, 1833
- Bisnius cephalotes (Gravenhorst, 1802)
- Bisnius fimetarius (Gravenhorst, 1802)
- Bisnius nigriventris (C. G. Thomson, 1867)
- Bisnius parcus (Sharp, 1874)
- Bisnius pseudoparcus (Brunne, 1976)
- Bisnius puella (Nordmann, 1837)
- Bisnius scoticus (Joy & Tomlin, 1913)
- Bisnius sordidus (Gravenhorst, 1802)
- Bisnius subuliformis (Gravenhorst, 1802)
- Cafius cicatricosus (Erichson, 1840)
- Cafius fucicola Curtis, 1830
- Cafius xantholoma (Gravenhorst, 1806)
- Erichsonius cinerascens (Gravenhorst, 1802)
- Erichsonius signaticornis (Mulsant & Rey, 1852)
- Erichsonius ytenensis (Sharp, 1913)
- Gabrius appendiculatus Sharp, 1910
- Gabrius astutoides (A. Strand, 1946)
- Gabrius bishopi Sharp, 1910
- Gabrius breviventer (Sperk, 1835)
- Gabrius exiguus (Nordmann, 1837)
- Gabrius keysianus Sharp, 1910
- Gabrius nigritulus (Gravenhorst, 1802)
- Gabrius osseticus (Kolenati, 1846)
- Gabrius piliger Mulsant & Rey, 1876
- Gabrius splendidulus (Gravenhorst, 1802)
- Gabrius trossulus (Nordmann, 1837)
- Gabrius velox Sharp, 1910
- Gabronthus thermarum (Aubé, 1850)
- Neobisnius lathrobioides (Baudi, 1848)
- Neobisnius procerulus (Gravenhorst, 1806)
- Neobisnius prolixus (Erichson, 1840)
- Neobisnius villosulus (Stephens, 1833)
- Philonthus addendus Sharp, 1867
- Philonthus albipes (Gravenhorst, 1802)
- Philonthus atratus (Gravenhorst, 1802)
- Philonthus carbonarius (Gravenhorst, 1802)
- Philonthus cognatus Stephens, 1832
- Philonthus concinnus (Gravenhorst, 1802)
- Philonthus confinis A. Strand, 1941
- Philonthus coprophilus Jarrige, 1949
- Philonthus corruscus (Gravenhorst, 1802)
- Philonthus corvinus Erichson, 1839
- Philonthus cruentatus (Gmelin in Linnaeus, 1790)
- Philonthus debilis (Gravenhorst, 1802)
- Philonthus decorus (Gravenhorst, 1802)
- Philonthus dimidiatipennis Erichson, 1840
- Philonthus discoideus (Gravenhorst, 1802)
- Philonthus ebeninus (Gravenhorst, 1802)
- Philonthus fumarius (Gravenhorst, 1806)
- Philonthus furcifer Renkonen, 1937
- Philonthus intermedius (Lacordaire, 1835)
- Philonthus jurgans Tottenham, 1937
- Philonthus laminatus (Creutzer, 1799)
- Philonthus lepidus (Gravenhorst, 1802)
- Philonthus longicornis Stephens, 1832
- Philonthus mannerheimi Fauvel, 1869
- Philonthus marginatus (O. F. Müller, 1764)
- Philonthus micans (Gravenhorst, 1802)
- Philonthus micantoides Benick & Lohse, 1956
- Philonthus nigrita (Gravenhorst, 1806)
- Philonthus nitidicollis (Boisduval & Lacordaire, 1835)
- Philonthus parvicornis (Gravenhorst, 1802)
- Philonthus politus (Linnaeus, 1758)
- Philonthus punctus (Gravenhorst, 1802)
- Philonthus quisquiliarius (Gyllenhal, 1810)
- Philonthus rectangulus Sharp, 1874
- Philonthus rotundicollis (Ménétriés, 1832)
- Philonthus rubripennis Stephens, 1832
- Philonthus rufipes (Stephens, 1832)
- Philonthus sanguinolentus (Gravenhorst, 1802)
- Philonthus spinipes Sharp, 1874
- Philonthus splendens (Fabricius, 1793)
- Philonthus succicola C. G. Thomson, 1860
- Philonthus tenuicornis Mulsant & Rey, 1853
- Philonthus umbratilis (Gravenhorst, 1802)
- Philonthus varians (Paykull, 1789)
- Philonthus ventralis (Gravenhorst, 1802)
- Rabigus pullus (Nordmann, 1837)
- Remus sericeus Holme, 1837
- Acylophorus glaberrimus (Herbst, 1784)
- Astrapaeus ulmi (Rossi, 1790)
- Euryporus picipes (Paykull, 1800)
- Heterothops binotatus (Gravenhorst, 1802)
- Heterothops dissimilis (Gravenhorst, 1802)
- Heterothops minutus Wollaston, 1860
- Heterothops niger Kraatz, 1868
- Heterothops praevius Erichson, 1839
- Quedius cinctus (Paykull, 1790)
- Quedius aetolicus Kraatz, 1858
- Quedius brevicornis (C. G. Thomson, 1860)
- Quedius brevis Erichson, 1840
- Quedius cruentus (Olivier, 1795)
- Quedius fulgidus (Fabricius, 1793)
- Quedius invreae Gridelli, 1924
- Quedius lateralis (Gravenhorst, 1802)
- Quedius longicornis Kraatz, 1857
- Quedius maurus (C. R. Sahlberg, 1830)
- Quedius mesomelinus (Marsham, 1802)
- Quedius microps J. L. C. Gravenhorst, 1847
- Quedius nigrocaeruleus Fauvel, 1874
- Quedius puncticollis (C. G. Thomson, 1867)
- Quedius scitus (Gravenhorst, 1806)
- Quedius truncicola Fairmaire & Laboulbène, 1856
- Quedius xanthopus Erichson, 1839
- Quedius plagiatus Mannerheim, 1843
- Quedius balticus Korge, 1960
- Quedius curtipennis Bernhauer, 1908
- Quedius fuliginosus (Gravenhorst, 1802)
- Quedius levicollis (Brullé, 1832)
- Quedius molochinus (Gravenhorst, 1806)
- Quedius simplicifrons Fairmaire, 1861
- Quedius auricomus Kiesenwetter, 1850
- Quedius boopoides Munster, 1923
- Quedius boops (Gravenhorst, 1802)
- Quedius fulvicollis (Stephens, 1833)
- Quedius fumatus (Stephens, 1833)
- Quedius humeralis Stephens, 1832
- Quedius maurorufus (Gravenhorst, 1806)
- Quedius nemoralis Baudi, 1848
- Quedius nigriceps Kraatz, 1857
- Quedius nitipennis (Stephens, 1833)
- Quedius persimilis Mulsant & Rey, 1876
- Quedius picipes (Mannerheim, 1830)
- Quedius plancus Erichson, 1840
- Quedius riparius Kellner, 1843
- Quedius schatzmayri Gridelli, 1922
- Quedius scintillans (Gravenhorst, 1806)
- Quedius semiaeneus (Stephens, 1833)
- Quedius semiobscurus (Marsham, 1802)
- Quedius umbrinus Erichson, 1839
- Velleius dilatatus (Fabricius, 1787)
- Creophilus maxillosus (Linnaeus, 1758)
- Dinothenarus pubescens (De Geer, 1774)
- Emus hirtus (Linnaeus, 17588)
- Ocypus brunnipes (Fabricius, 1781)
- Ocypus nitens (Schrank, 1781)
- Ocypus olens (O. F. Müller, 1764)
- Ocypus ophthalmicus (Scopoli, 1763)
- Ocypus aeneocephalus (De Geer, 1774)
- Ocypus fortunatarum (Wollaston, 1871)
- Ocypus fuscatus (Gravenhorst, 1802)
- Ontholestes murinus (Linnaeus, 1758)
- Ontholestes tessellatus (Geoffroy, 1785)
- Platydracus fulvipes (Scopoli, 1763)
- Platydracus latebricola (Gravenhorst, 1806)
- Platydracus stercorarius (Olivier, 1795)
- Staphylinus caesareus Cederhjelm, 1798
- Staphylinus dimidiaticornis Gemminger, 1851
- Staphylinus erythropterus Linnaeus, 1758
- Tasgius globulifer (Geoffroy, 1785)
- Tasgius melanarius (Heer, 1839)
- Tasgius morsitans (Rossi, 1790)
- Tasgius winkleri Bernhauer, 1906
- Tasgius ater (Gravenhorst, 1802)
- Tasgius pedator (Gravenhorst, 1802)
- Gauropterus fulgidus (Fabricius, 1787)
- Gyrohypnus angustatus Stephens, 1833
- Gyrohypnus atratus (Heer, 1839)
- Gyrohypnus fracticornis (O. F. Müller, 1776)
- Gyrohypnus punctulatus (Paykull, 1789)
- Hypnogyra angularis Ganglbauer, 1895
- Leptacinus batychrus (Gyllenhal, 1827)
- Leptacinus formicetorum Märkel, 1841
- Leptacinus intermedius Donisthorpe, 1936
- Leptacinus pusillus (Stephens, 1833)
- Megalinus glabratus (Gravenhorst, 1802)
- Nudobius lentus (Gravenhorst, 1806)
- Phacophallus parumpunctatus (Gyllenhal, 1827)
- Phacophallus pallidipennis (Motschulsky, 1858)
- Xantholinus laevigatus Jacobsen, 1849
- Xantholinus elegans (Olivier, 1795)
- Xantholinus tricolor (Fabricius, 1787)
- Xantholinus gallicus Coiffait, 1956
- Xantholinus linearis (Olivier, 1795)
- Xantholinus longiventris Heer, 1839
