= Plataraea elegans =

Scientific classification
- Kingdom: Animalia
- Phylum: Arthropoda
- Class: Insecta
- Order: Coleoptera
- Suborder: Polyphaga
- Infraorder: Staphyliniformia
- Family: Staphylinidae
- Genus: Plataraea
- Species: P. elegans

Binomial name
- Plataraea elegans (Benick, 1934)

Species of beetle

Plataraea elegans is a species of rove beetles. It is found in Europe.
