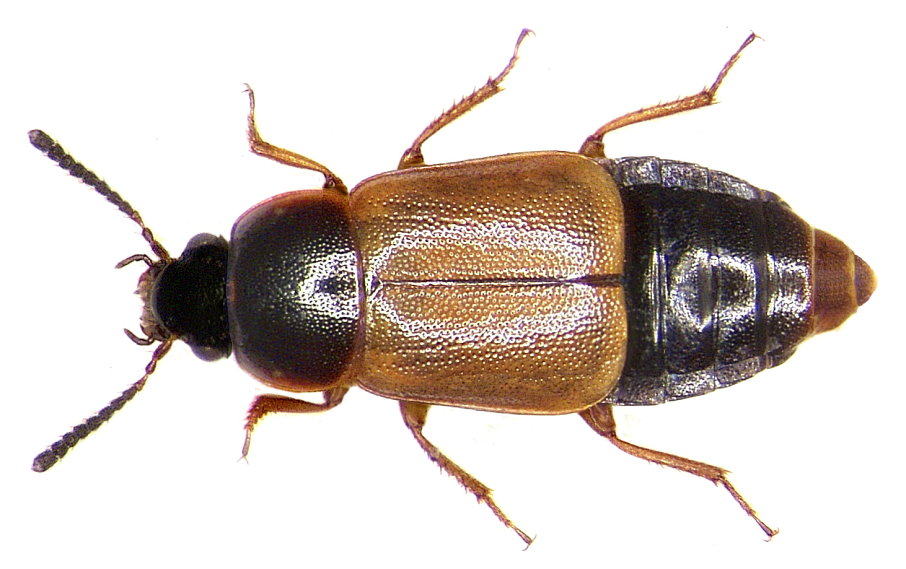
- Deliphrum tectum

Scientific classification
- Kingdom: Animalia
- Phylum: Arthropoda
- Class: Insecta
- Order: Coleoptera
- Suborder: Polyphaga
- Infraorder: Staphyliniformia
- Family: Staphylinidae
- Genus: Deliphrum; Erichson, 1839

= Deliphrum =

Genus of beetles

Deliphrum is a genus of beetles belonging to the family Staphylinidae.

Synonyms:

- Arpediopsis Ganglbauer, 1895
- Adeliphron Agassiz, 1846

Species:

- Deliphrum tectum
