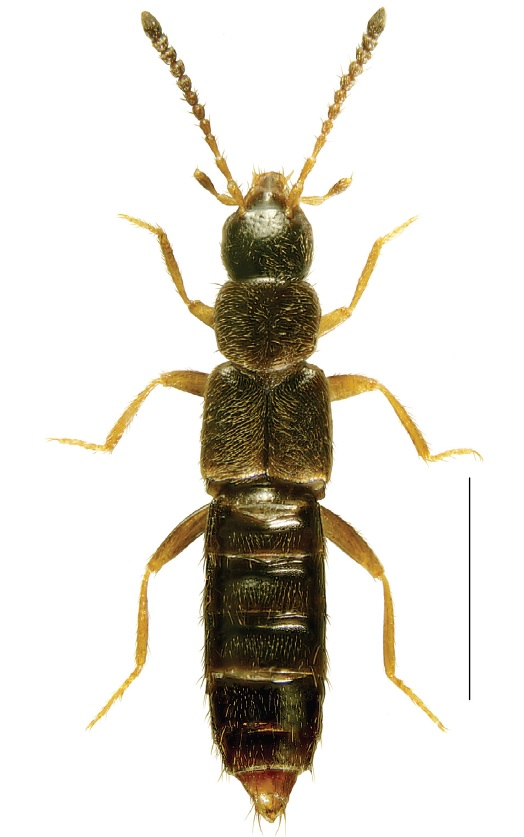
- Halobrecta flavipes

Scientific classification
- Kingdom: Animalia
- Phylum: Arthropoda
- Class: Insecta
- Order: Coleoptera
- Suborder: Polyphaga
- Infraorder: Staphyliniformia
- Family: Staphylinidae
- Subfamily: Aleocharinae
- Genus: Halobrecta; Thomson, 1858

= Halobrecta =

Genus of beetles

Halobrecta is a genus of rove beetles in the family Staphylinidae. There are about six described species in Halobrecta.

== Species ==
These six species belong to the genus Halobrecta:

- Halobrecta algae (Hardy, 1851)
- Halobrecta algophila (Fenyes, 1909)
- Halobrecta discipula Pace, 1999
- Halobrecta flavipes Thomson, 1861
- Halobrecta halensis Mulsant & Rey, 1873
- Halobrecta princeps (Sharp, 1869)
