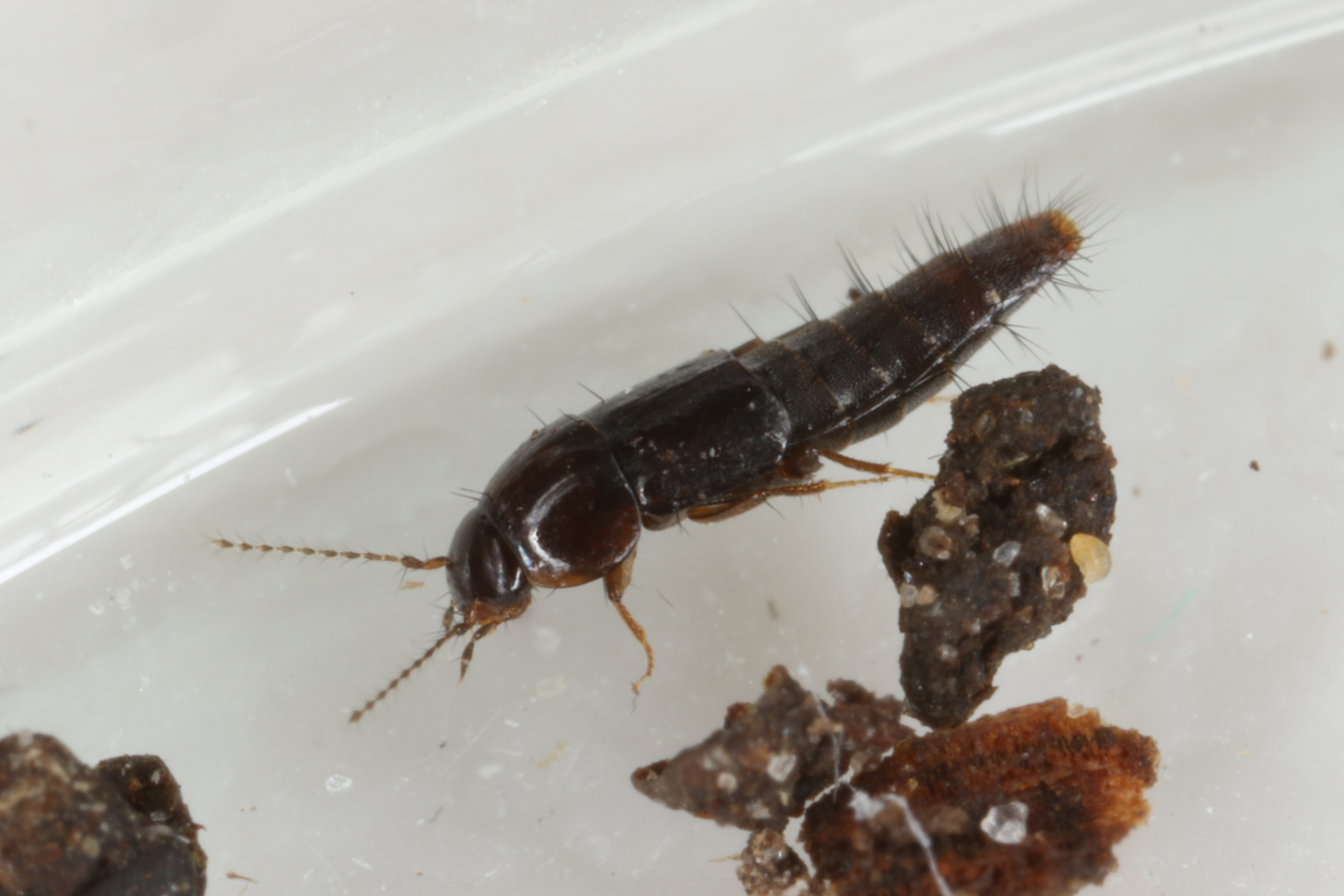
- Habrocerus capillaricornis

Scientific classification
- Kingdom: Animalia
- Phylum: Arthropoda
- Clade: Pancrustacea
- Class: Insecta
- Order: Coleoptera
- Suborder: Polyphaga
- Infraorder: Staphyliniformia
- Family: Staphylinidae
- Subfamily: Habrocerinae; Mulsant & Rey, 1877

= Habrocerinae =

Subfamily of beetles

The Habrocerinae are a subfamily of the Staphylinidae, rove beetles.

== Anatomy ==
The antennomeres of the Habrocerinae are extremely slender. Their bodies are in general compact and sublimuloid, and the tarsi, like many rove beetles, have 5-5-5 segments. They are found in forest litter, wood debris, and fungi. Of the two known genera, one genus, Habrocerus with three species occurs in North America.

== Genera ==
- Habrocerus Erichson, 1839
- Nomimocerus Coiffait & Sáiz, 1965
