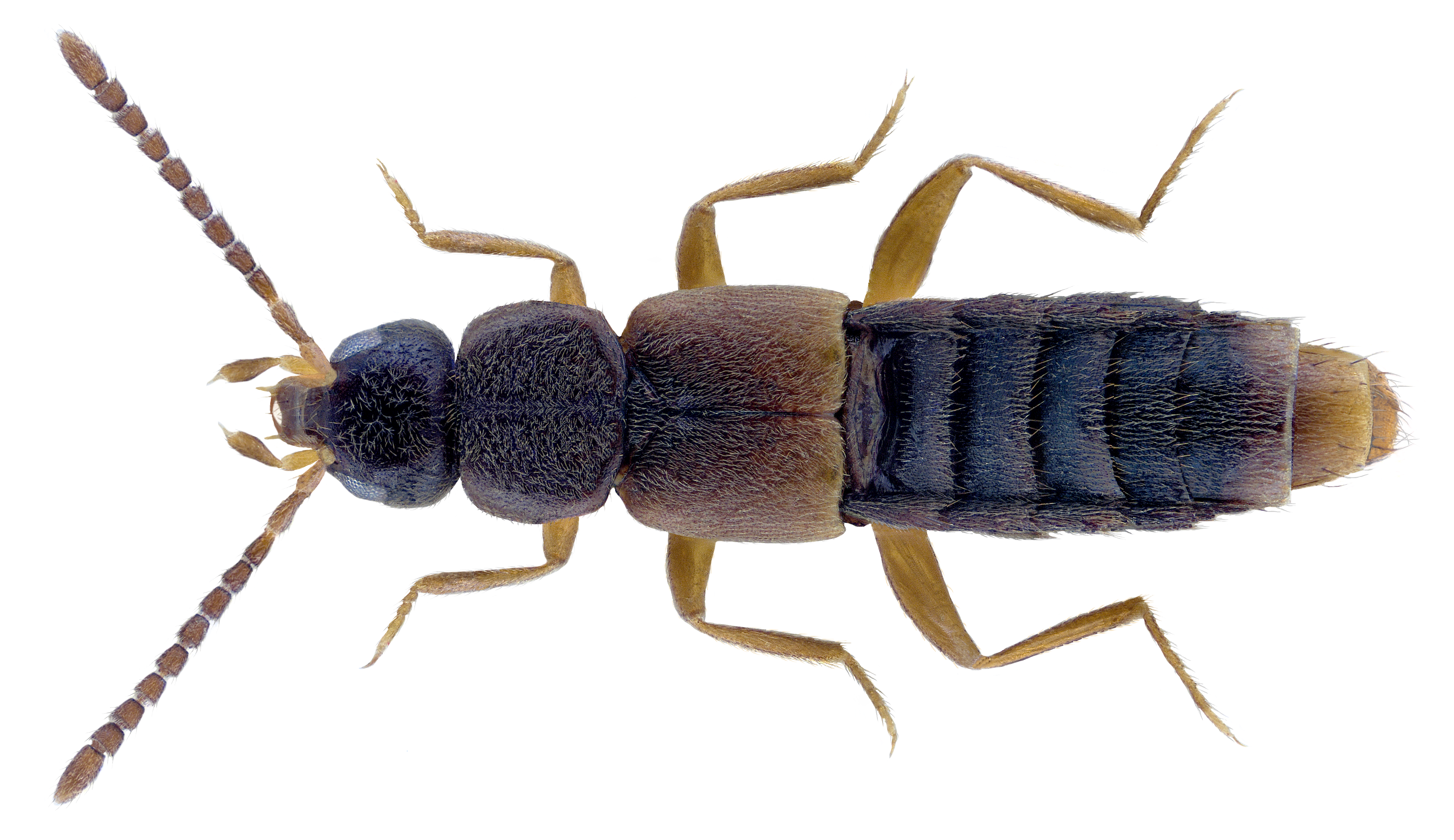
- Dacrila fallax

Scientific classification
- Kingdom: Animalia
- Phylum: Arthropoda
- Class: Insecta
- Order: Coleoptera
- Suborder: Polyphaga
- Infraorder: Staphyliniformia
- Family: Staphylinidae
- Genus: Dacrila; Mulsant & Rey, 1874

= Dacrila =

Genus of beetles

Dacrila is a genus of beetles belonging to the family Staphylinidae.

The genus was first described by Mulsant and Rey in 1874.

The species of this genus are found in Europe.

Species:

- Dacrila fallax (Kraatz, 1856)
- Dacrila setigera Pace, 1998
- Dacrila smetanai Pace, 1998
