= Nomimocerus =

Scientific classification
- Domain: Eukaryota
- Kingdom: Animalia
- Phylum: Arthropoda
- Class: Insecta
- Order: Coleoptera
- Suborder: Polyphaga
- Infraorder: Staphyliniformia
- Family: Staphylinidae
- Subfamily: Habrocerinae
- Genus: Nomimocerus (Coiffait & Sáiz, 1965)

Genus of beetles

Nomimocerus is a genus of rove beetles in the family Staphylinidae.

== Species ==
There are about 6 species described in Nomimocerus.

- Nomimocerus conus (Assing & Wunderle, 1996)
- Nomimocerus longispinosus (Assing & Wunderle, 1995)
- Nomimocerus marginicollis (Solier, 1849)
- Nomimocerus parvispinosus (Assing & Wunderle, 1995)
- Nomimocerus peckorum (Assing & Wunderle, 1995)
- Nomimocerus septentrionalis (Assing, 1998)
