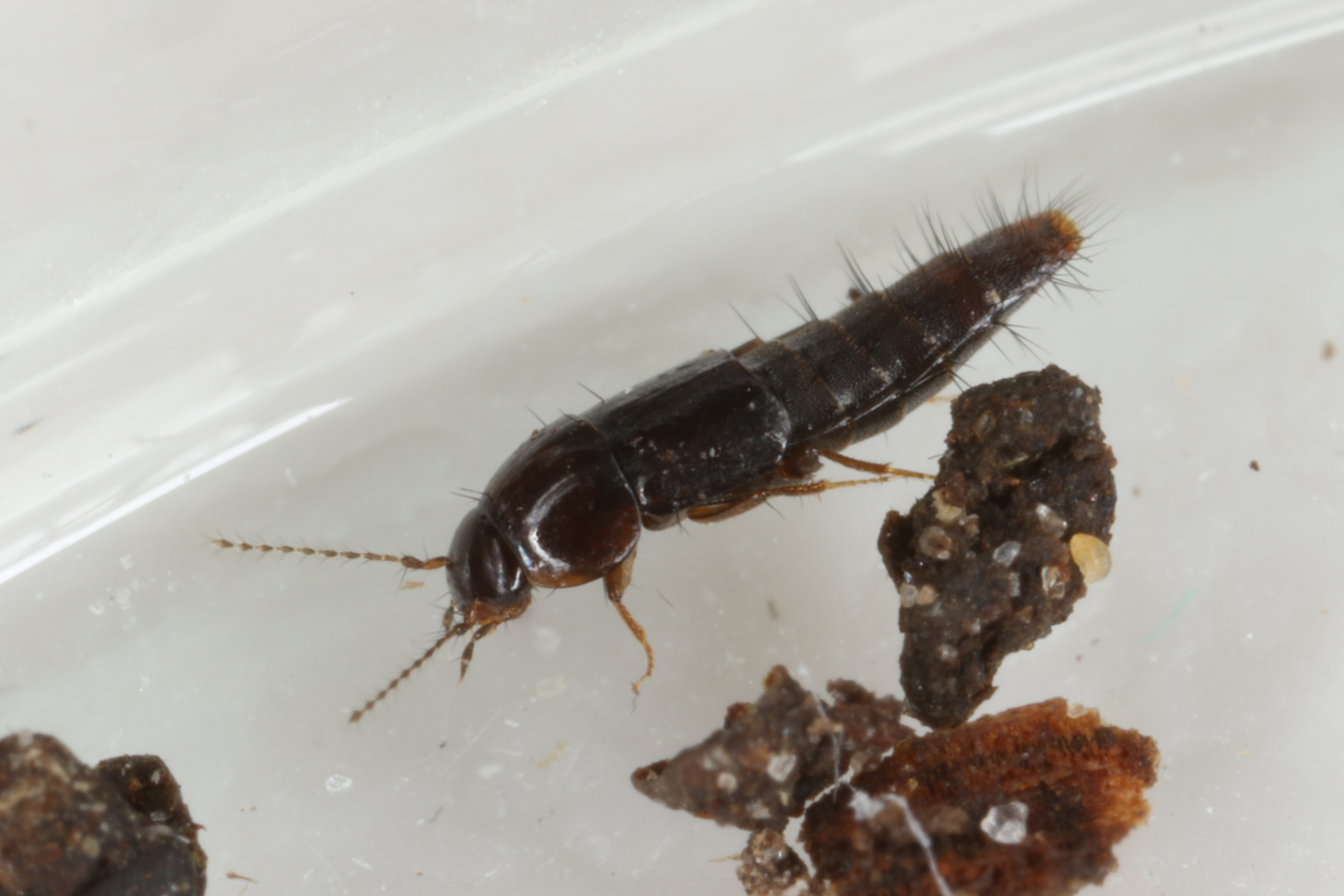
- Habrocerus capillaricornis

Scientific classification
- Kingdom: Animalia
- Phylum: Arthropoda
- Class: Insecta
- Order: Coleoptera
- Suborder: Polyphaga
- Infraorder: Staphyliniformia
- Family: Staphylinidae
- Subfamily: Habrocerinae
- Genus: Habrocerus; Erichson, 1839

= Habrocerus =

Genus of beetles

Habrocerus is a genus of rove beetles in the family Staphylinidae. There are about eight described species in Habrocerus.

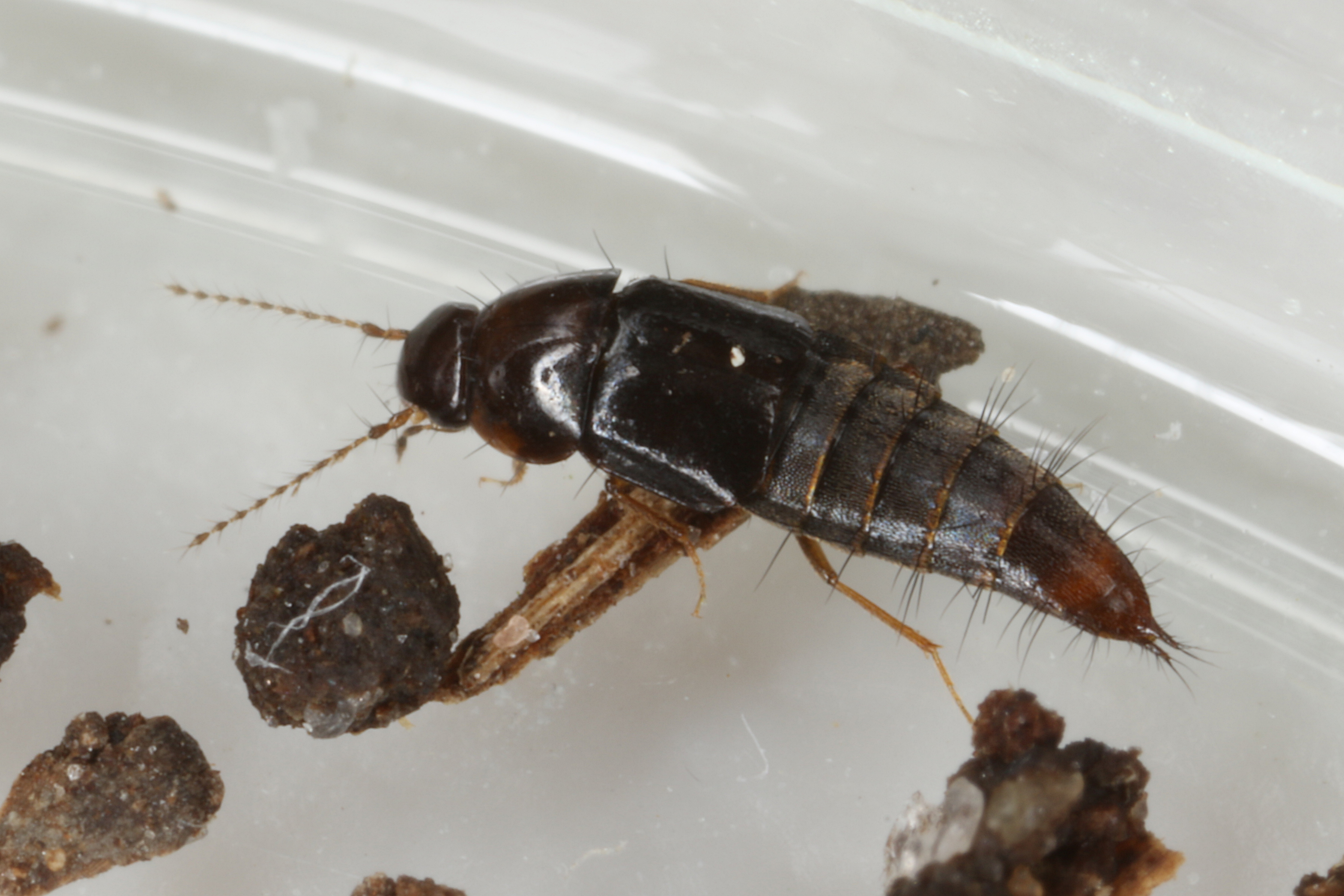
Habrocerus capillaricornis

== Species ==
These eight species belong to the genus Habrocerus:

- Habrocerus canariensis Assing & Wunderle, 1995^{g}
- Habrocerus capillaricornis (Gravenhorst, 1806)^{g b}
- Habrocerus cyprensis Assing & Wunderle, 1995^{g}
- Habrocerus ibericus Assing & Wunderle, 1995^{g}
- Habrocerus magnus LeConte, 1878^{g}
- Habrocerus pisidicus Korge, 1971^{g}
- Habrocerus schuelkei Assing & Wunderle, 1996^{c g}
- Habrocerus schwarzi Horn, 1877^{g}

Data sources: i = ITIS, c = Catalogue of Life, g = GBIF, b = Bugguide.net
