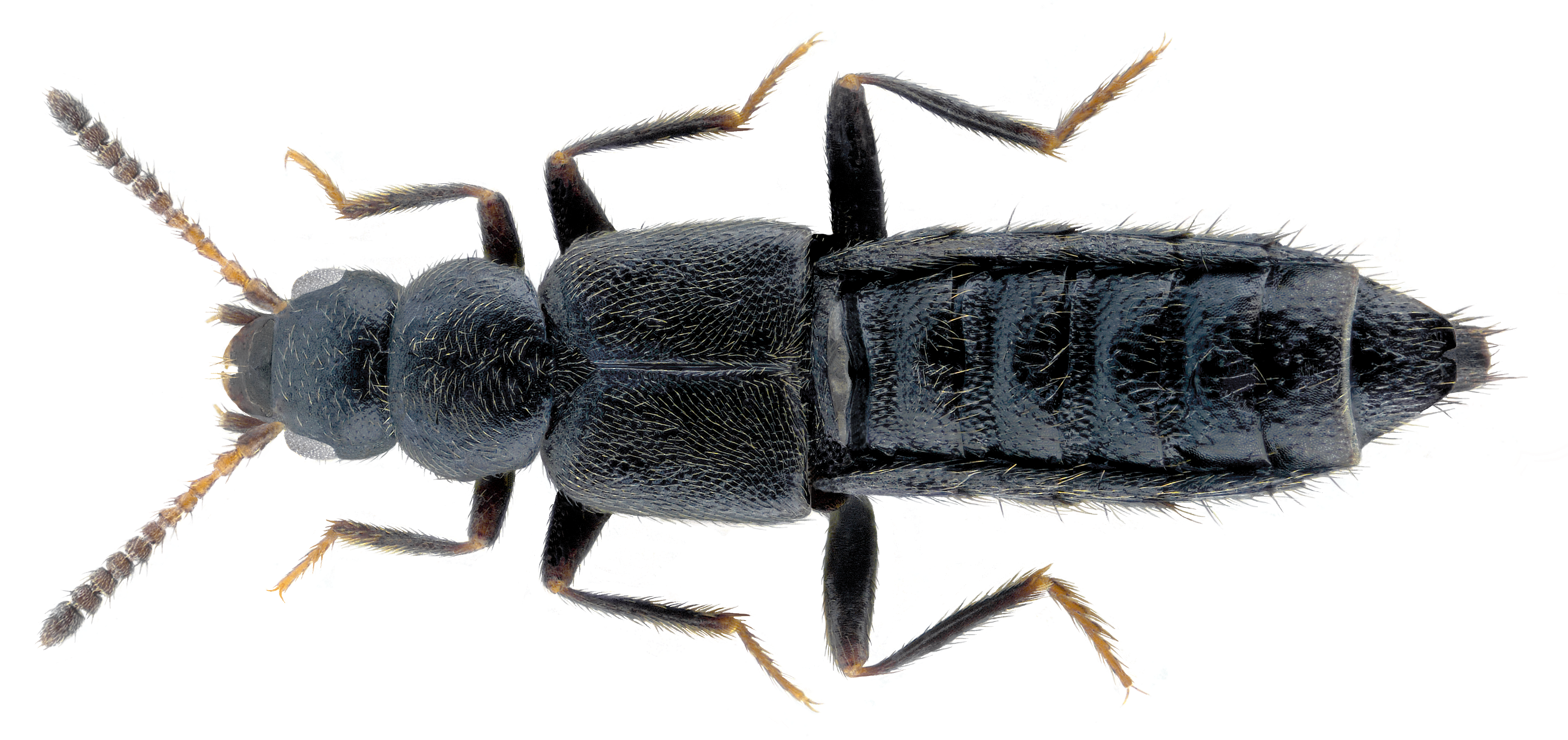
- Alianta incana

Scientific classification
- Kingdom: Animalia
- Phylum: Arthropoda
- Class: Insecta
- Order: Coleoptera
- Suborder: Polyphaga
- Infraorder: Staphyliniformia
- Family: Staphylinidae
- Genus: Alianta; Thomson, 1858

= Alianta =

Genus of beetles

Alianta is a genus of beetle belonging to the family Staphylinidae.

The genus was first described by Carl Gustaf Thomson in 1858.

The species of this genus are found in Europe.

Species:

- Alianta bigranosa Eppelsheim, 1895
- Alianta bipartita Fauvel, 1900
- Alianta brucki (Eppelsheim, 1876)
- Alianta curta J.Sahlberg, 1880
- Alianta incana (Erichson, 1837)
