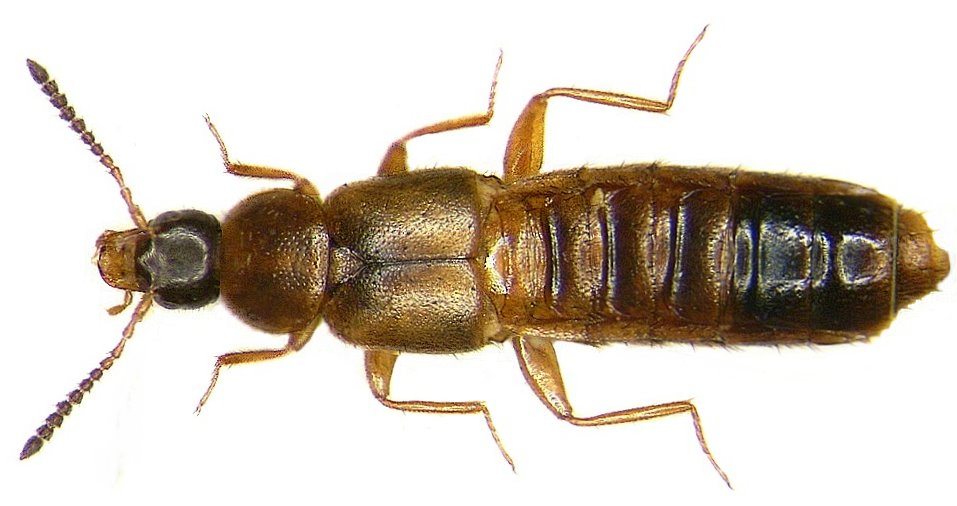
- Plataraea brunnea 3-4,5 mm

Scientific classification
- Kingdom: Animalia
- Phylum: Arthropoda
- Class: Insecta
- Order: Coleoptera
- Suborder: Polyphaga
- Infraorder: Staphyliniformia
- Family: Staphylinidae
- Tribe: Athetini
- Genus: Plataraea; Thomson, 1858

Species
- Plataraea brunnea; Plataraea dubiosa; Plataraea elegans; Plataraea interurbana; Plataraea nigriceps; Plataraea nigrifrons

= Plataraea =

Genus of beetles

Plataraea is a genus of rove beetles.
