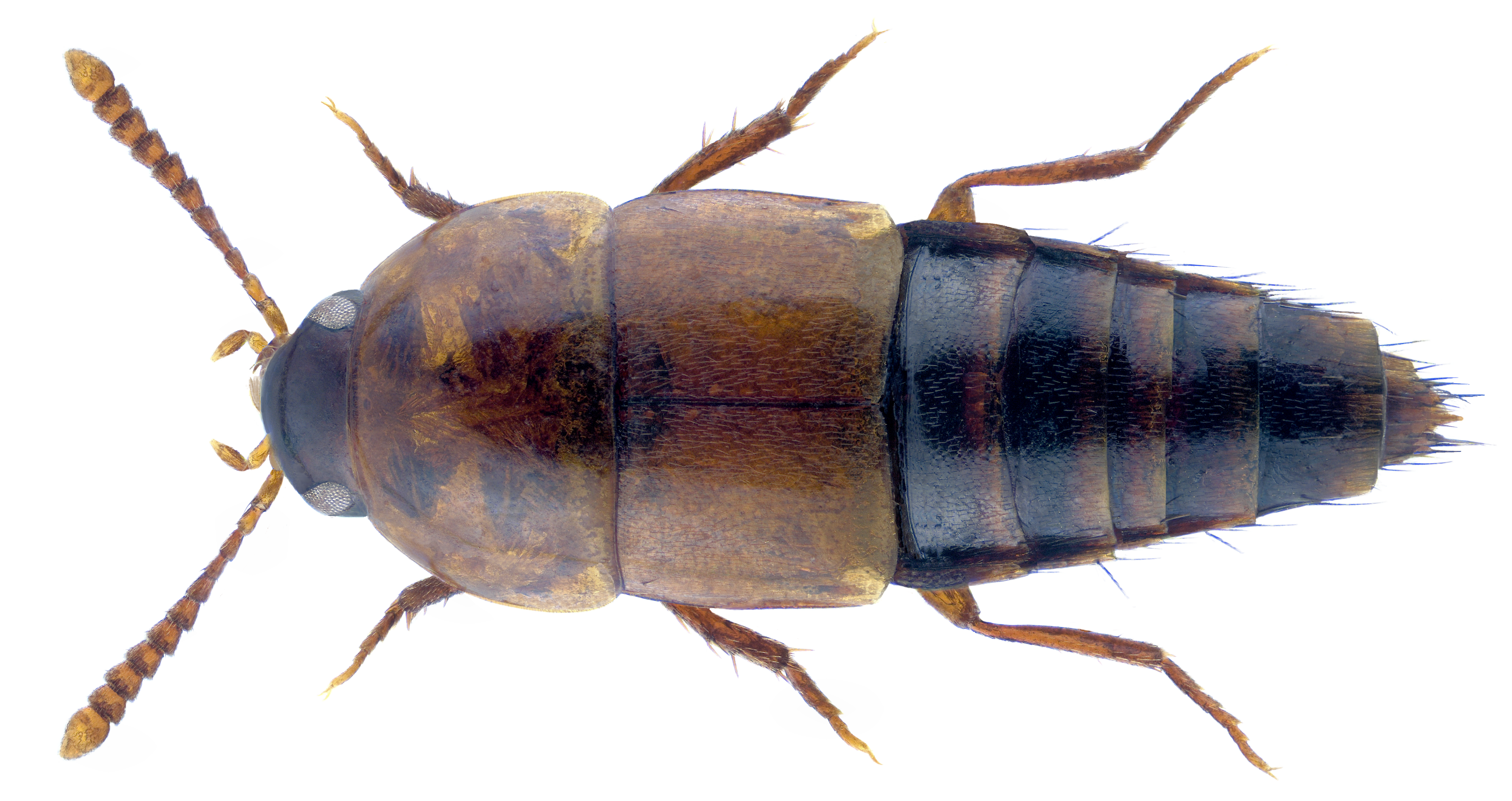
- Lamprinodes saginatus

Scientific classification
- Domain: Eukaryota
- Kingdom: Animalia
- Phylum: Arthropoda
- Class: Insecta
- Order: Coleoptera
- Suborder: Polyphaga
- Infraorder: Staphyliniformia
- Family: Staphylinidae
- Genus: Lamprinodes; Luze, 1901

= Lamprinodes =

Genus of beetles

Lamprinodes is a genus of beetles belonging to the family Staphylinidae.

Species:

- Lamprinodes saginatus
