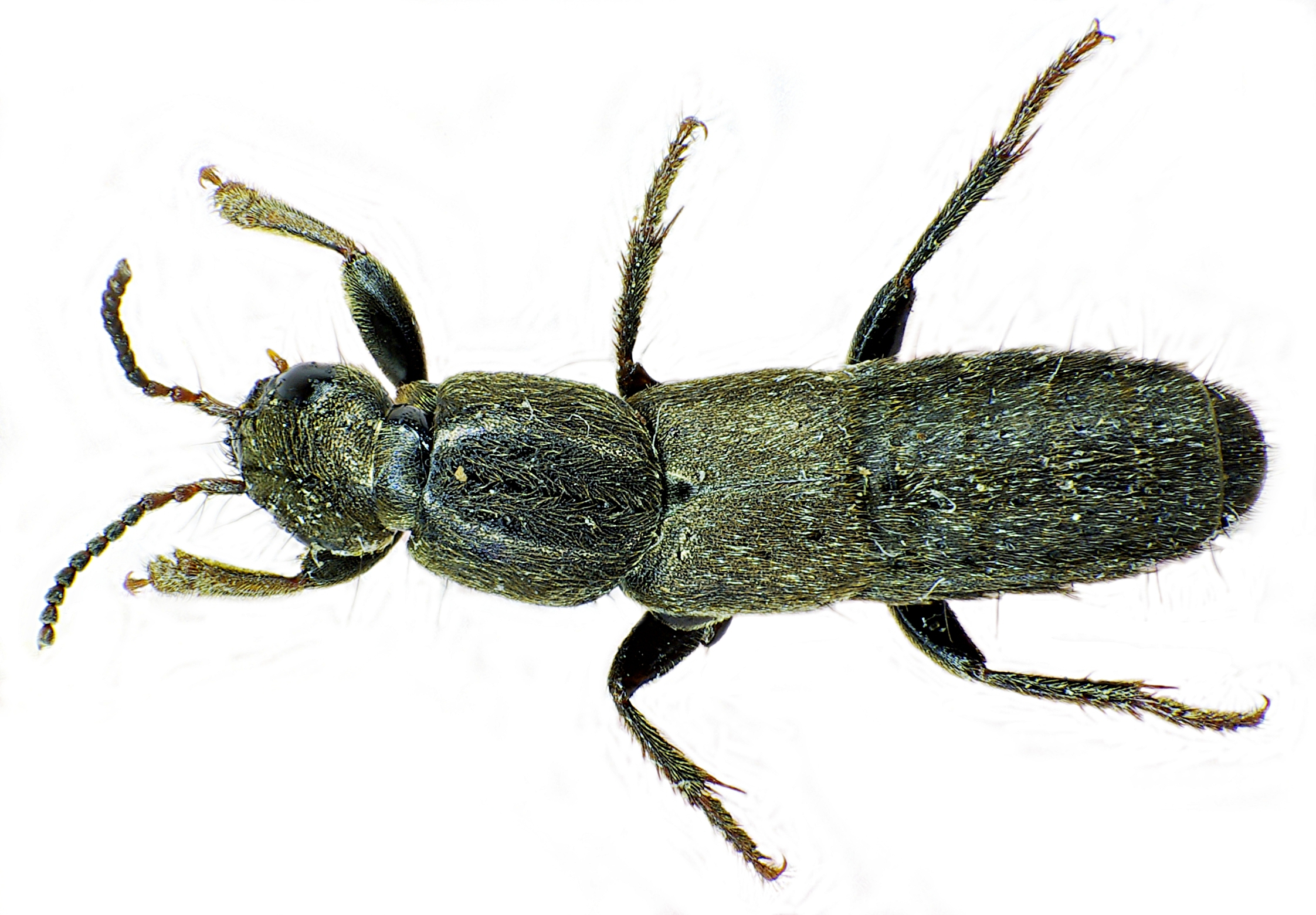

Scientific classification
- Kingdom: Animalia
- Phylum: Arthropoda
- Class: Insecta
- Order: Coleoptera
- Suborder: Polyphaga
- Infraorder: Staphyliniformia
- Family: Staphylinidae
- Genus: Ocypus
- Species: O. aeneocephalus

Binomial name
- Ocypus aeneocephalus (De Geer, 1774)

= Ocypus aeneocephalus =

Species of beetle

Ocypus aeneocephalus is a species of large rove beetle in the family Staphylinidae.
