= Quedius curtipennis =

Scientific classification
- Kingdom: Animalia
- Phylum: Arthropoda
- Class: Insecta
- Order: Coleoptera
- Suborder: Polyphaga
- Infraorder: Staphyliniformia
- Family: Staphylinidae
- Genus: Quedius
- Species: Q. curtipennis

Binomial name
- Quedius curtipennis Bernhauer, 1908

Species of beetle

Quedius curtipennis is a beetle found in Britain. It is similar in appearance to Quedius fuliginosus, which is a less common species, however, the eyes of fuliginosus are more convex and the basal antennal segments darker. The punctures on the elytra are slightly stronger in Q. curtipennis.
