= Halobrecta algophila =

Scientific classification
- Kingdom: Animalia
- Phylum: Arthropoda
- Class: Insecta
- Order: Coleoptera
- Suborder: Polyphaga
- Infraorder: Staphyliniformia
- Family: Staphylinidae
- Genus: Halobrecta
- Species: H. algophila

Binomial name
- Halobrecta algophila (Fenyes, 1909)

Species of beetle

Halobrecta algophila is a species of rove beetle in the family Staphylinidae. It is found in Australia, Europe and Northern Asia (excluding China), North America, South America, and New Zealand.
