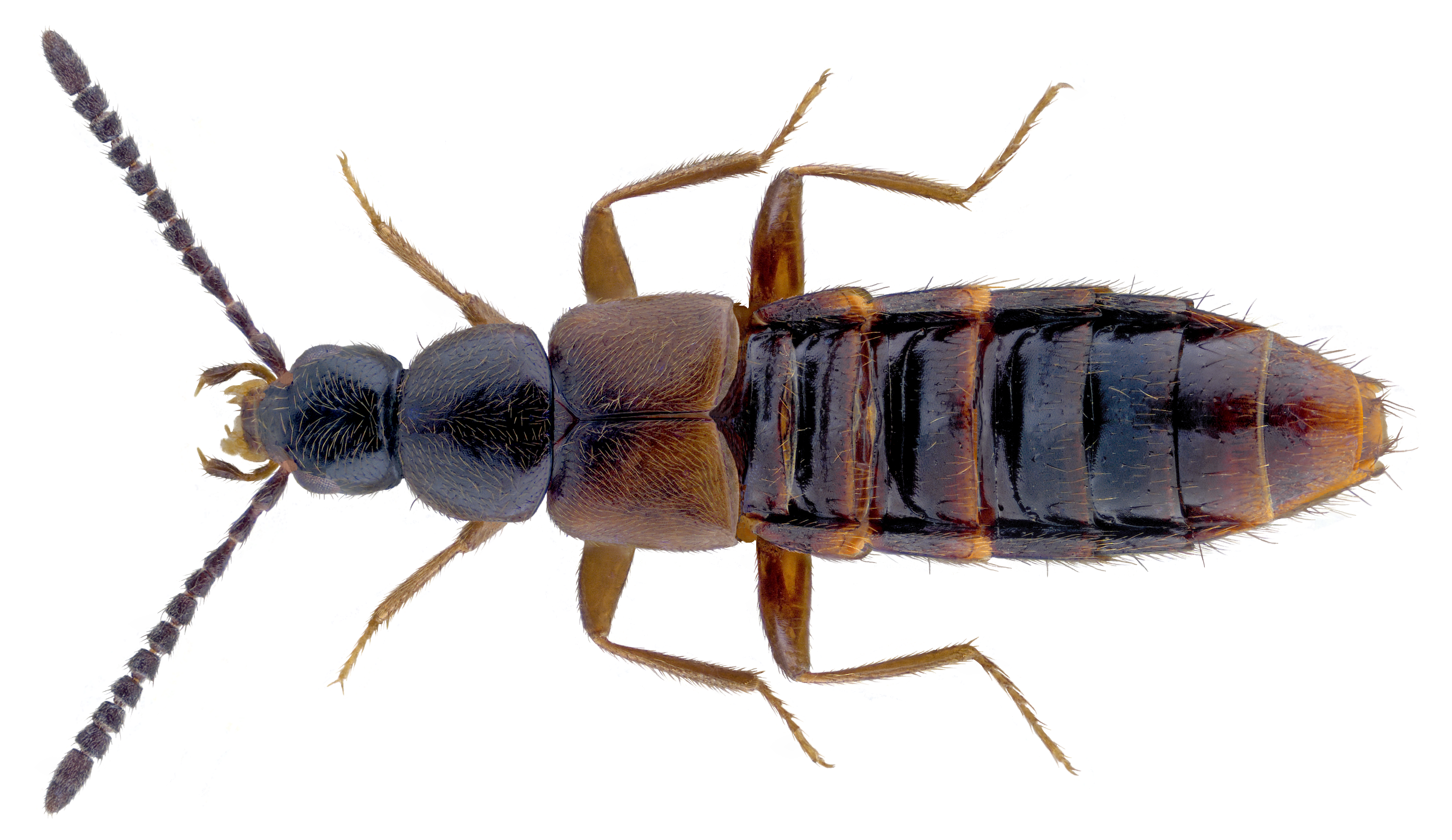

Scientific classification
- Domain: Eukaryota
- Kingdom: Animalia
- Phylum: Arthropoda
- Class: Insecta
- Order: Coleoptera
- Suborder: Polyphaga
- Infraorder: Staphyliniformia
- Family: Staphylinidae
- Genus: Liogluta
- Species: L. microptera

Binomial name
- Liogluta microptera Thomson, 1867

= Liogluta microptera =

Species of beetle

Liogluta microptera is a species of beetle belonging to the family Staphylinidae.

It is native to Europe.
