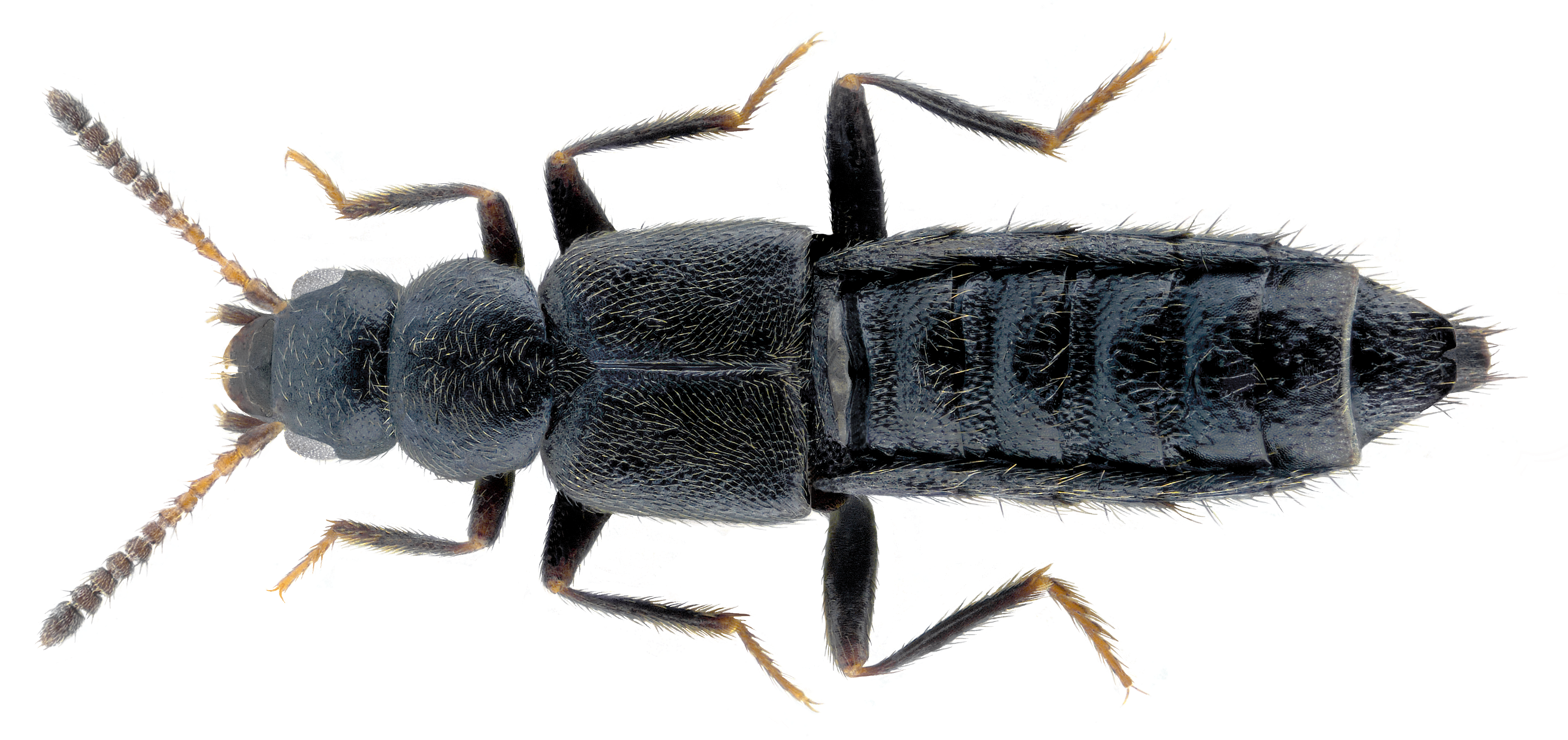

Scientific classification
- Kingdom: Animalia
- Phylum: Arthropoda
- Class: Insecta
- Order: Coleoptera
- Suborder: Polyphaga
- Infraorder: Staphyliniformia
- Family: Staphylinidae
- Genus: Alianta
- Species: A. incana

Binomial name
- Alianta incana (Erichson, 1837)

= Alianta incana =

Species of beetle

Alianta incana is a species of beetle belonging to the family Staphylinidae.

It is native to Europe.
