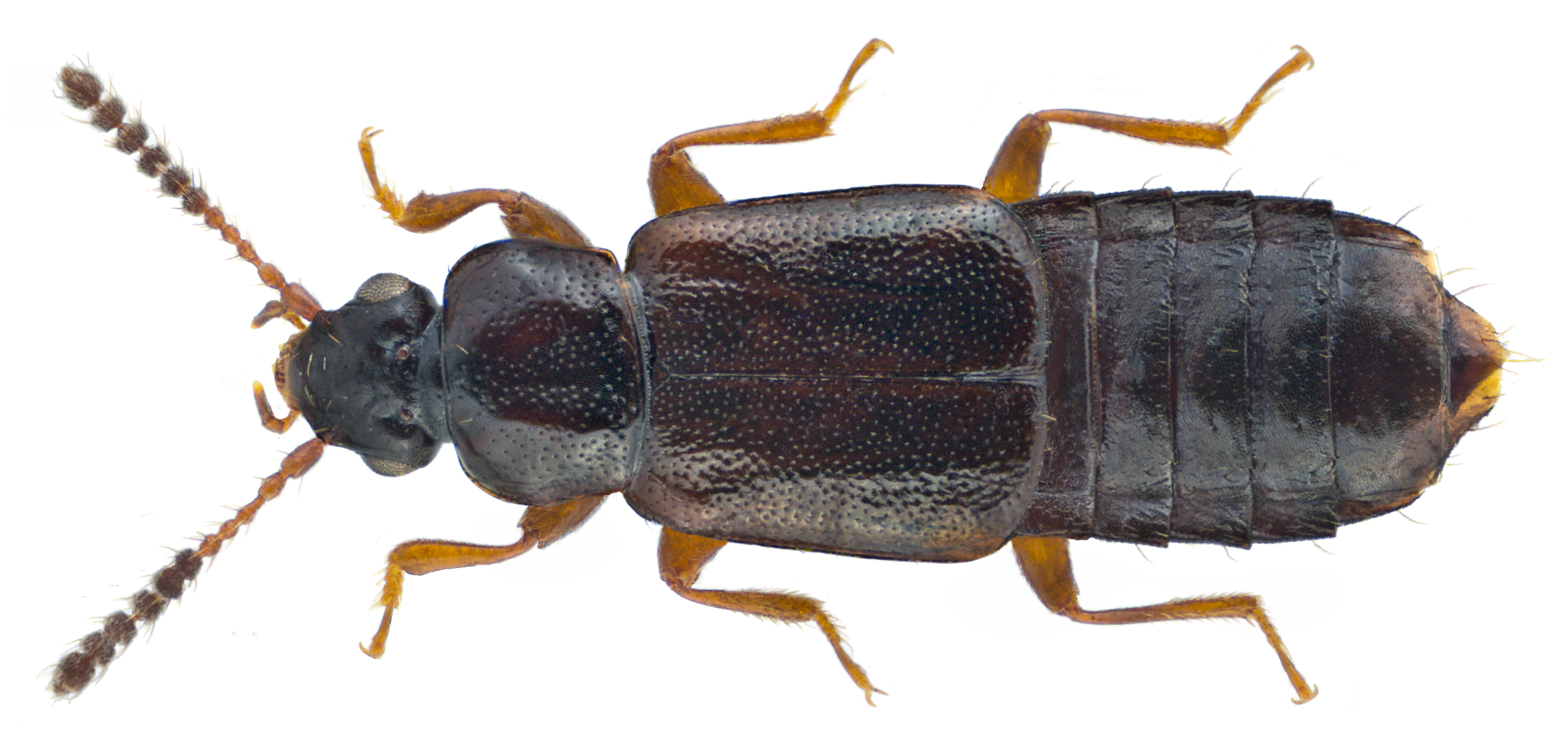
- Xylostiba monilicornis

Scientific classification
- Domain: Eukaryota
- Kingdom: Animalia
- Phylum: Arthropoda
- Class: Insecta
- Order: Coleoptera
- Suborder: Polyphaga
- Infraorder: Staphyliniformia
- Family: Staphylinidae
- Genus: Xylostiba; Ganglbauer, 1895

= Xylostiba =

Genus of beetles

Xylostiba is a genus of beetles belonging to the family Staphylinidae.

The species of this genus are found in Europe.

Species:

- Xylostiba bosnica (Bernhauer, 1902)
- Xylostiba congoensis (Bernhauer, 1934)
