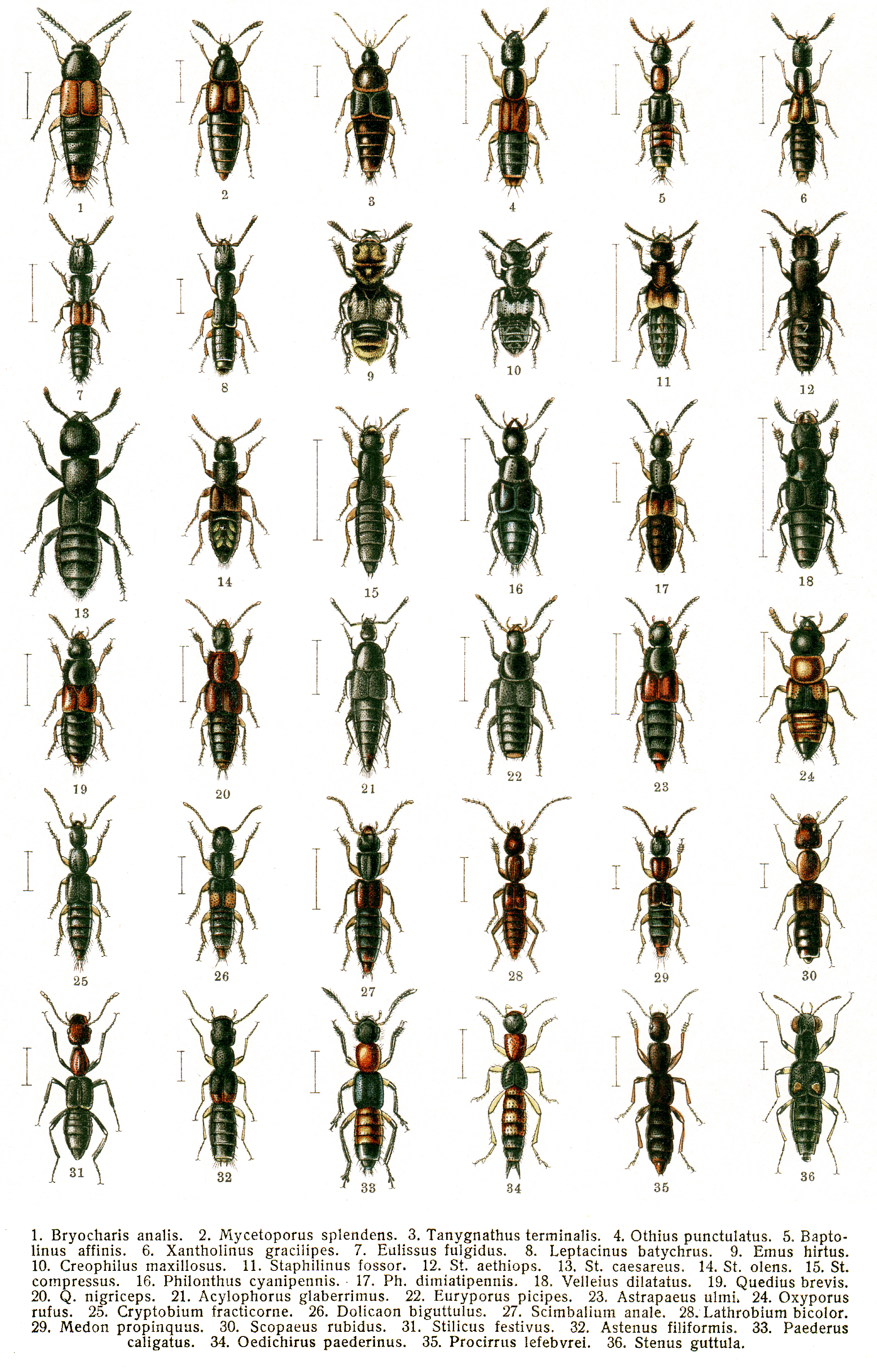
- Quedius brevis figure 19

Scientific classification
- Kingdom: Animalia
- Phylum: Arthropoda
- Class: Insecta
- Order: Coleoptera
- Suborder: Polyphaga
- Infraorder: Staphyliniformia
- Family: Staphylinidae
- Genus: Quedius
- Species: Q. brevis

Binomial name
- Quedius brevis Erichson, 1840

= Quedius brevis =

Species of beetle

Quedius brevis is a species of rove beetles native to Europe.
