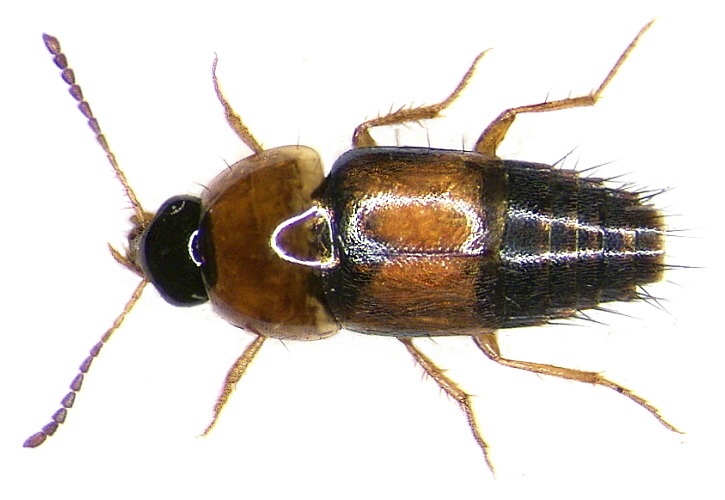
- 2.5–3.5 mm long

Scientific classification
- Kingdom: Animalia
- Phylum: Arthropoda
- Clade: Pancrustacea
- Class: Insecta
- Order: Coleoptera
- Suborder: Polyphaga
- Infraorder: Staphyliniformia
- Family: Staphylinidae
- Genus: Tachyporus
- Species: T. dispar

Binomial name
- Tachyporus dispar (Paykull, 1789)

= Tachyporus dispar =

Species of beetle

Tachyporus dispar is a species of rove beetle from Tachyporinae subfamily that can be found in Czech Republic, Slovakia, and throughout Western Europe (except Andorra, Luxembourg, Malta, and Portugal, where its existence is unknown).
