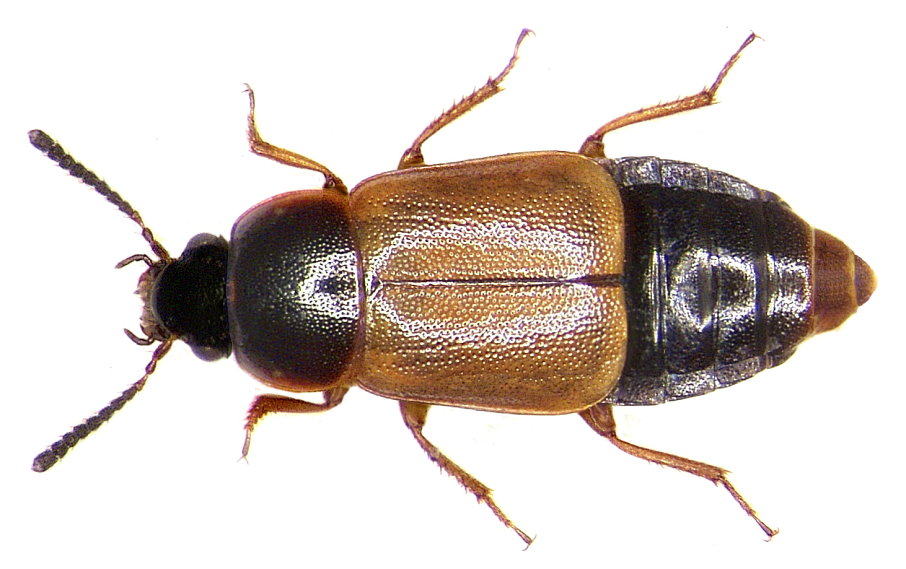
- Deliphrum tectum 3-4 mm

Scientific classification
- Kingdom: Animalia
- Phylum: Arthropoda
- Clade: Pancrustacea
- Class: Insecta
- Order: Coleoptera
- Suborder: Polyphaga
- Infraorder: Staphyliniformia
- Family: Staphylinidae
- Genus: Deliphrum
- Species: D. tectum

Binomial name
- Deliphrum tectum (Paykull, 1789)

= Deliphrum tectum =

Species of beetle

Deliphrum tectum is a species of rove beetles native to Europe.
