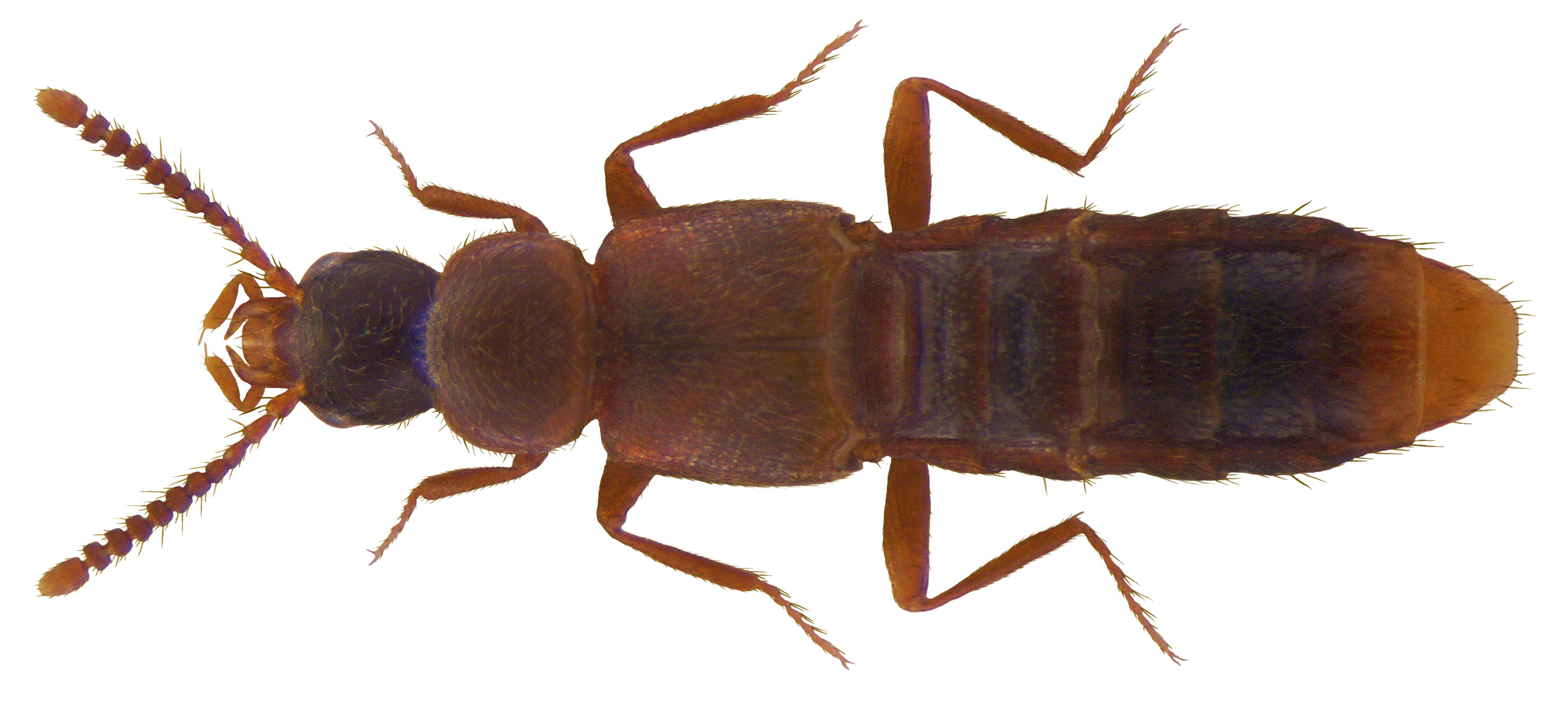
- Ischnoglossa prolixa 2,6-3,2 mm

Scientific classification
- Domain: Eukaryota
- Kingdom: Animalia
- Phylum: Arthropoda
- Class: Insecta
- Order: Coleoptera
- Suborder: Polyphaga
- Infraorder: Staphyliniformia
- Family: Staphylinidae
- Genus: Ischnoglossa
- Species: I. prolixa

Binomial name
- Ischnoglossa prolixa Gravenhorst, 1802

= Ischnoglossa prolixa =

Species of beetle

Ischnoglossa prolixa is a species of rove beetles native to Europe.
