= Liogluta alpestris =

Scientific classification
- Domain: Eukaryota
- Kingdom: Animalia
- Phylum: Arthropoda
- Class: Insecta
- Order: Coleoptera
- Suborder: Polyphaga
- Infraorder: Staphyliniformia
- Family: Staphylinidae
- Genus: Liogluta
- Species: L. alpestris

Binomial name
- Liogluta alpestris (Heer, 1839)

Species of beetle

Liogluta alpestris is a species of beetle belonging to the family Staphylinidae.

It is native to Europe.
