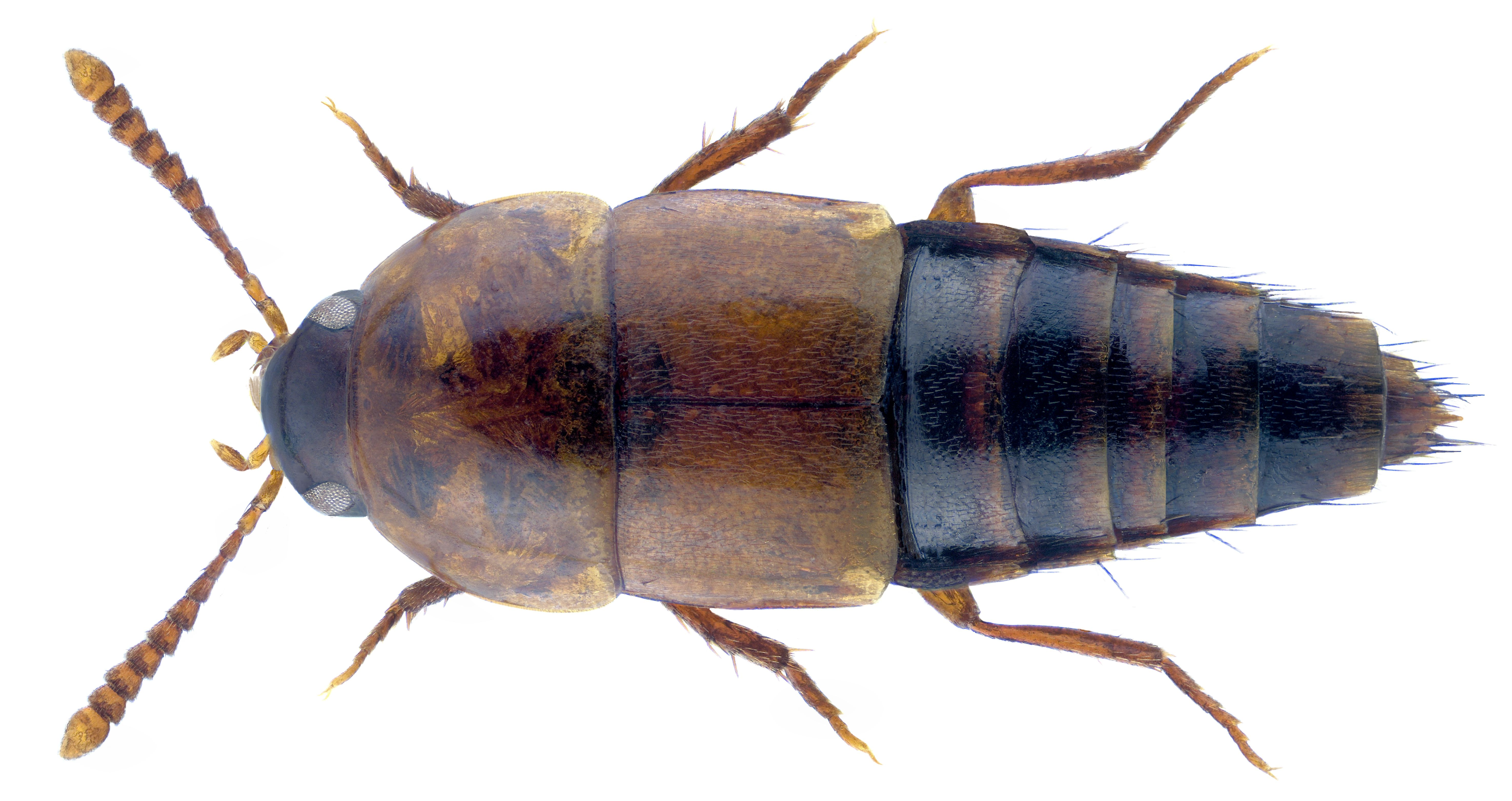

Scientific classification
- Domain: Eukaryota
- Kingdom: Animalia
- Phylum: Arthropoda
- Class: Insecta
- Order: Coleoptera
- Suborder: Polyphaga
- Infraorder: Staphyliniformia
- Family: Staphylinidae
- Genus: Lamprinodes
- Species: L. saginatus

Binomial name
- Lamprinodes saginatus (Gravenhorst, 1806)

= Lamprinodes saginatus =

Species of beetle

Lamprinodes saginatus is a species of beetle belonging to the family Staphylinidae.

It is native to Europe.
