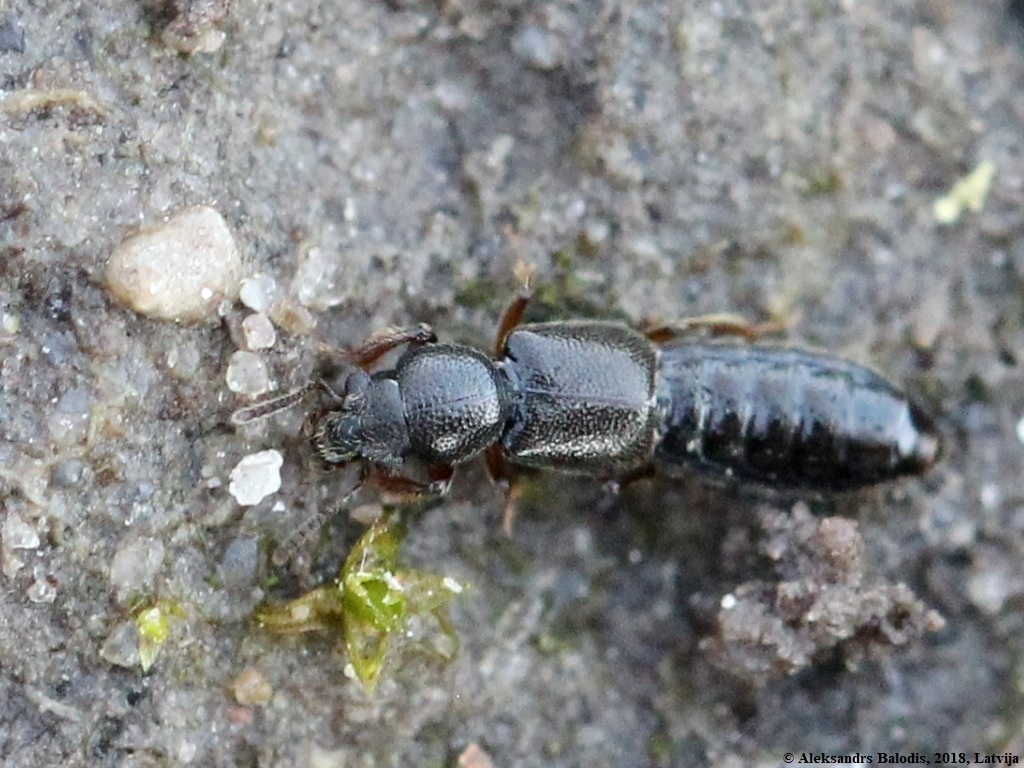

Scientific classification
- Kingdom: Animalia
- Phylum: Arthropoda
- Class: Insecta
- Order: Coleoptera
- Suborder: Polyphaga
- Infraorder: Staphyliniformia
- Family: Staphylinidae
- Genus: Bledius
- Species: B. filipes

Binomial name
- Bledius filipes Sharp, 1911

= Bledius filipes =

Species of beetle

Bledius filipes is a species of beetle belonging to the family Staphylinidae.

It is native to Europe.
