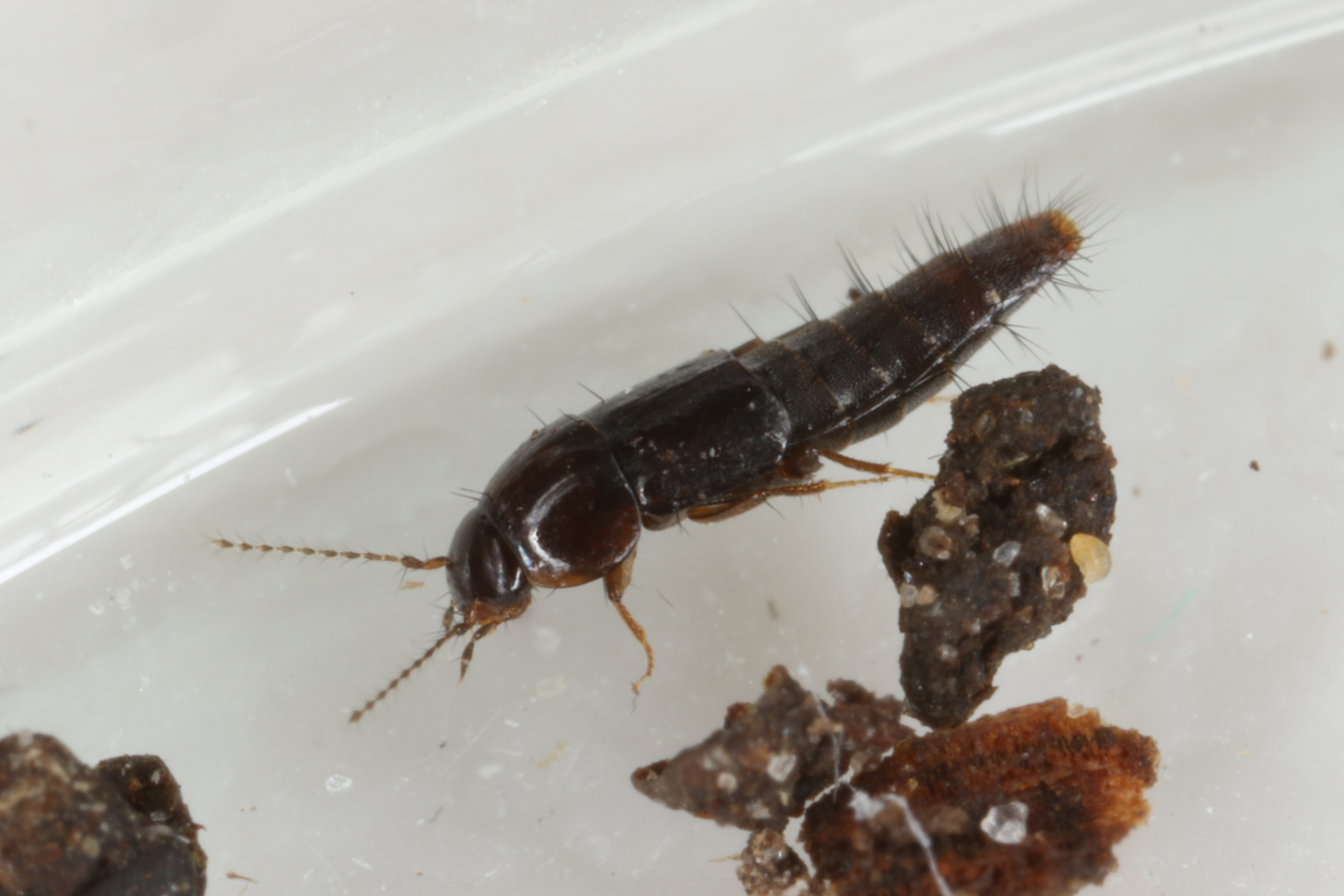

Scientific classification
- Domain: Eukaryota
- Kingdom: Animalia
- Phylum: Arthropoda
- Class: Insecta
- Order: Coleoptera
- Suborder: Polyphaga
- Infraorder: Staphyliniformia
- Family: Staphylinidae
- Genus: Habrocerus
- Species: H. capillaricornis

Binomial name
- Habrocerus capillaricornis (Gravenhorst, 1806)

= Habrocerus capillaricornis =

Species of beetle

Habrocerus capillaricornis is a species of rove beetle in the family Staphylinidae.

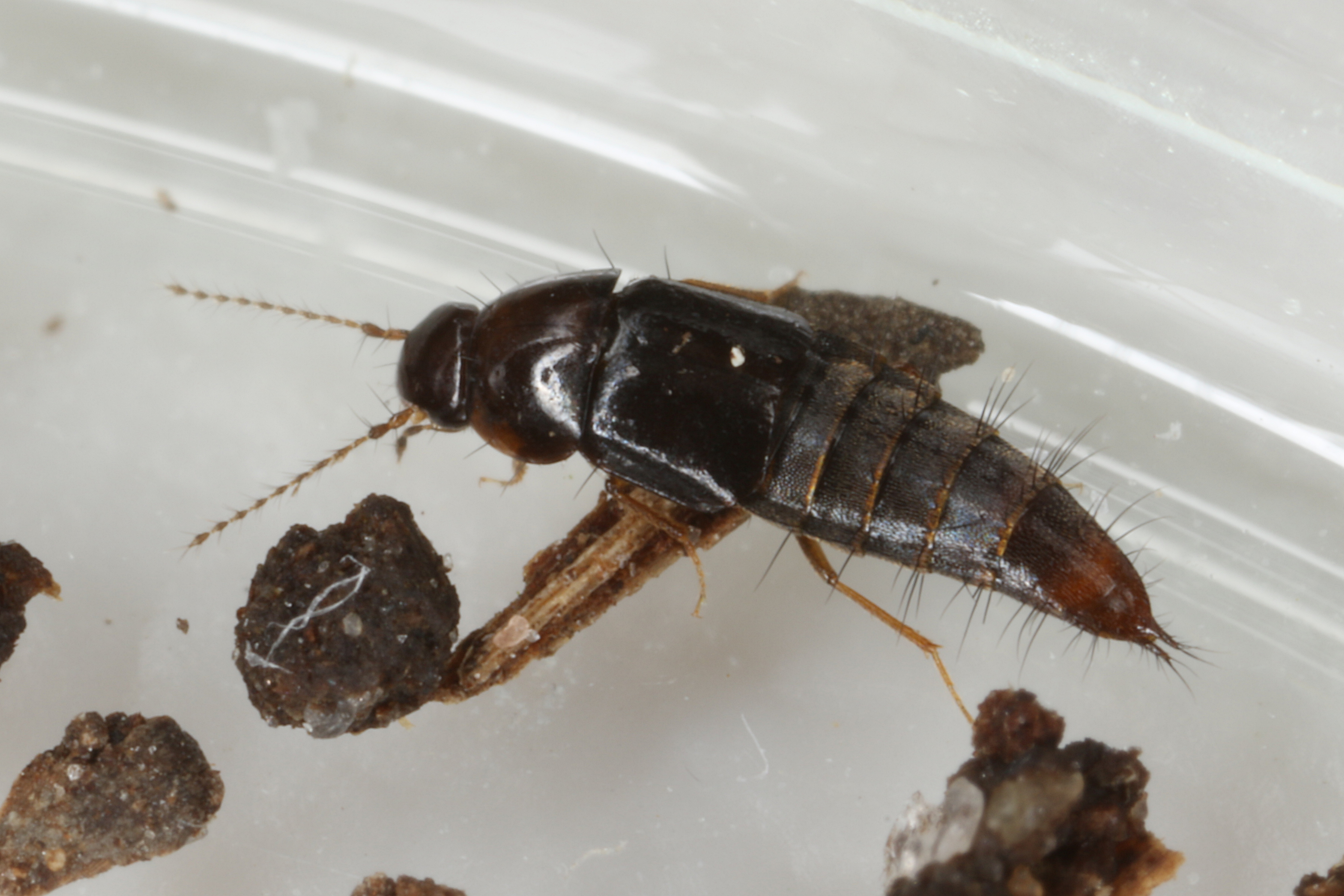
