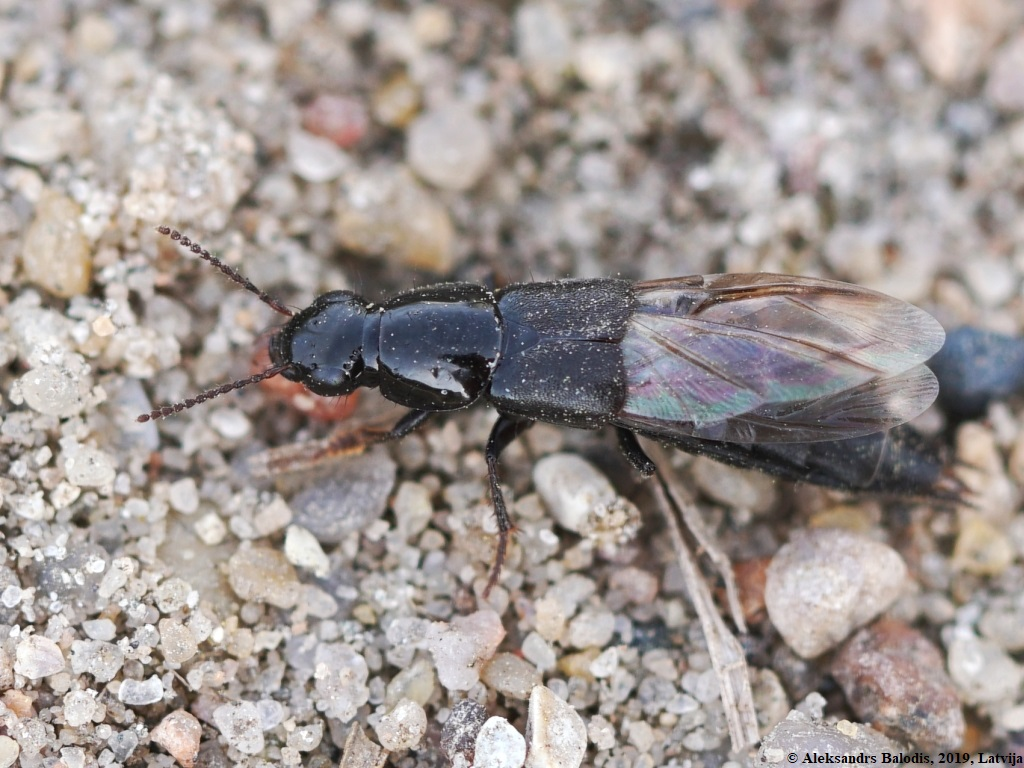

Scientific classification
- Kingdom: Animalia
- Phylum: Arthropoda
- Class: Insecta
- Order: Coleoptera
- Suborder: Polyphaga
- Infraorder: Staphyliniformia
- Family: Staphylinidae
- Genus: Quedius
- Species: Q. fuliginosus

Binomial name
- Quedius fuliginosus (Gravenhorst, 1802)

= Quedius fuliginosus =

Species of beetle

Quedius fuliginosus is a beetle found in Britain and, possibly by traveling in dry ballast, North America. It is similar in appearance to Quedius curtipennis, which is a more common species, however, the eyes of fuliginosus are more convex and the basal antennal segments darker. The punctures on the elytra are slightly stronger in curtipennis.
