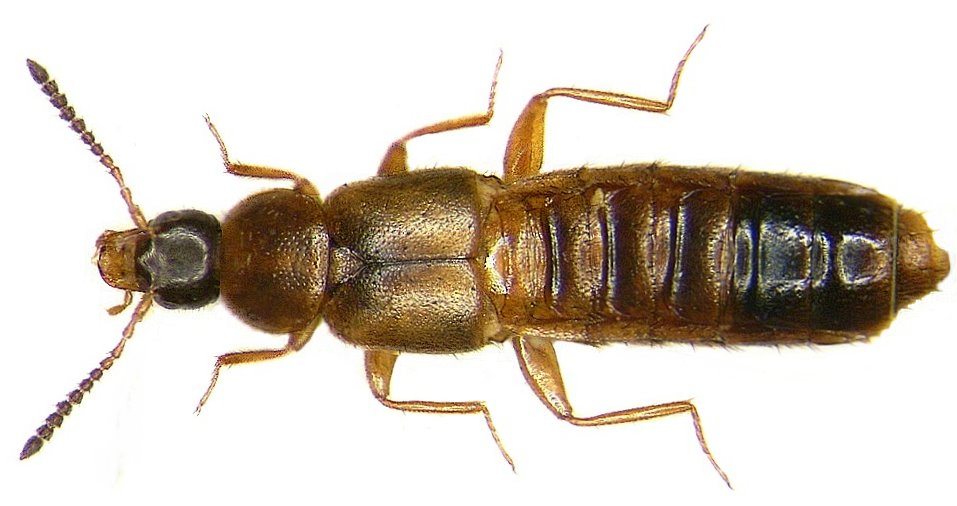
- 3–4.5 mm long

Scientific classification
- Kingdom: Animalia
- Phylum: Arthropoda
- Class: Insecta
- Order: Coleoptera
- Suborder: Polyphaga
- Infraorder: Staphyliniformia
- Family: Staphylinidae
- Genus: Plataraea
- Species: P. brunnea

Binomial name
- Plataraea brunnea (Fabricius, 1791)

= Plataraea brunnea =

Species of beetle

Plataraea brunnea is a species of rove beetles native to Europe.
