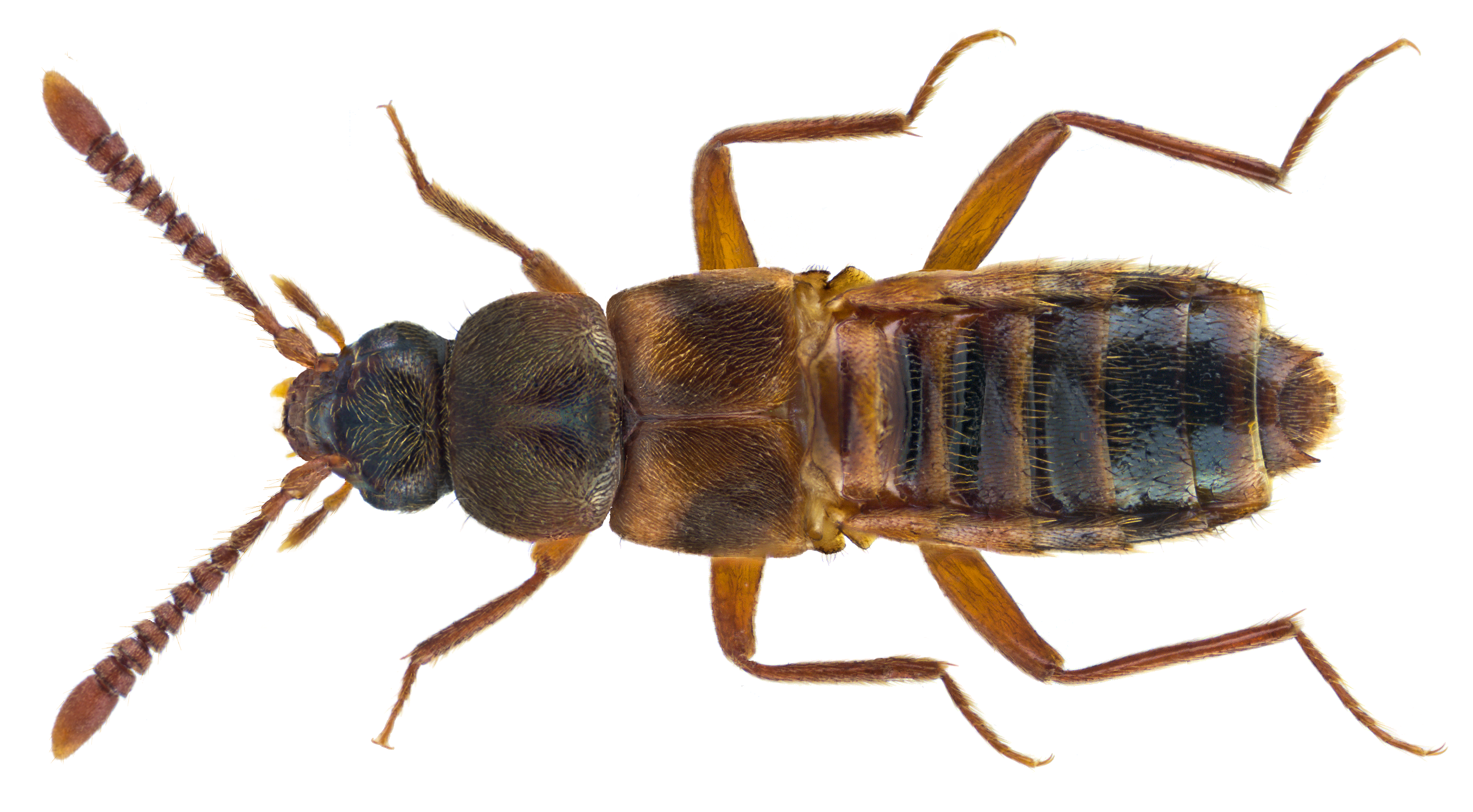

Scientific classification
- Kingdom: Animalia
- Phylum: Arthropoda
- Clade: Pancrustacea
- Class: Insecta
- Order: Coleoptera
- Suborder: Polyphaga
- Infraorder: Staphyliniformia
- Family: Staphylinidae
- Genus: Pella
- Species: P. limbata

Binomial name
- Pella limbata (Paykull, 1789)

Synonyms
- Zyras limbatus (Paykull, 1789)

= Pella limbata =

Species of beetle

Pella limbata is a species of beetle belonging to the family Staphylinidae native to Europe.
