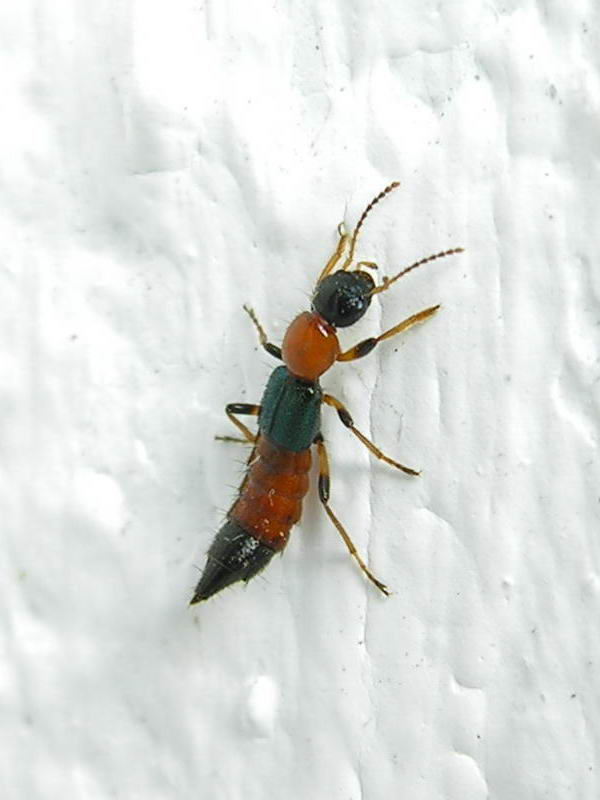
- Paederus littoralis
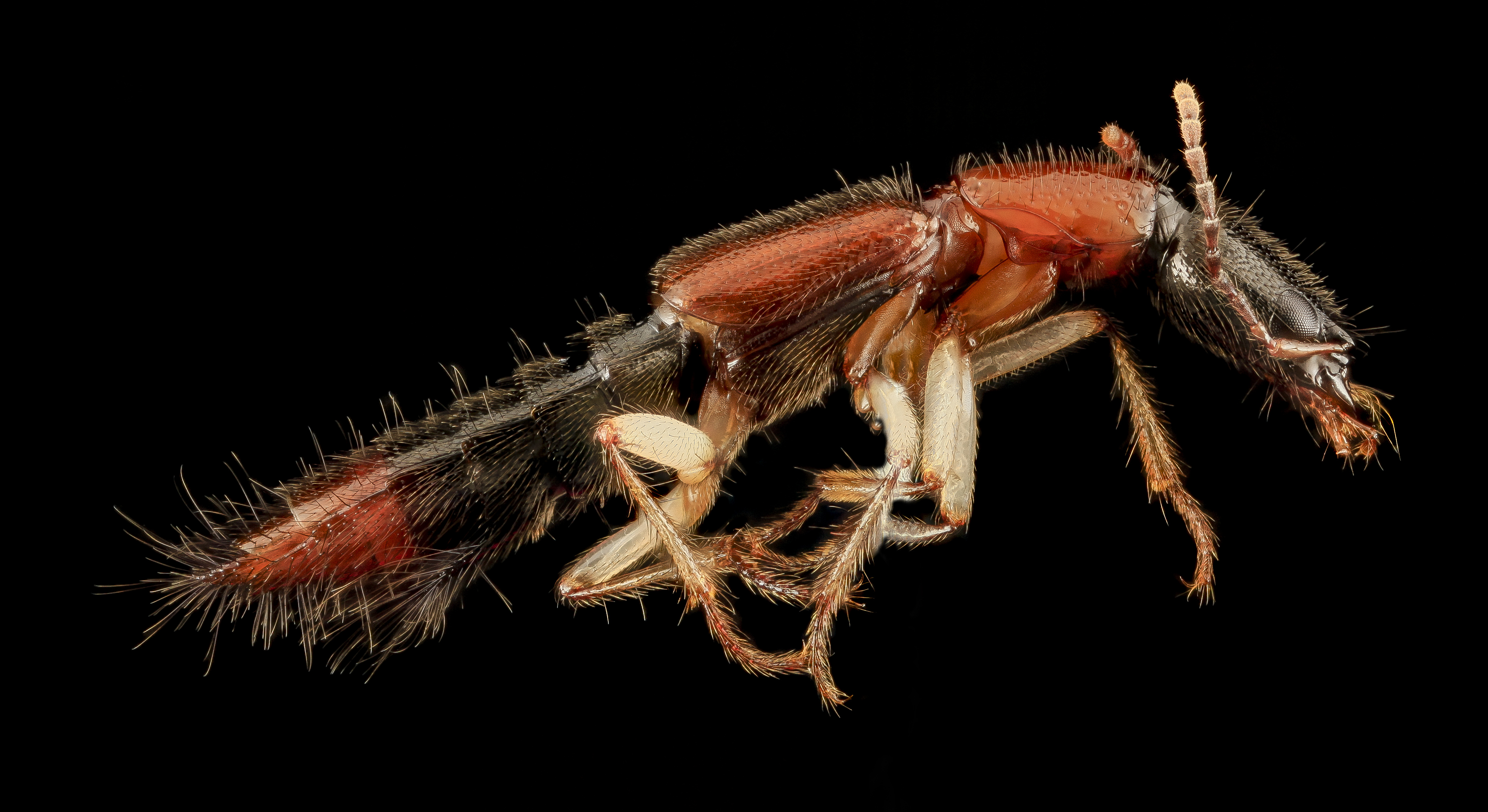
- Unknown species

Scientific classification
- Kingdom: Animalia
- Phylum: Arthropoda
- Clade: Pancrustacea
- Class: Insecta
- Order: Coleoptera
- Suborder: Polyphaga
- Infraorder: Staphyliniformia
- Family: Staphylinidae
- Subfamily: Paederinae
- Tribe: Paederini; Fleming, 1821

= Paederini =

Tribe of beetles

Paederini is a tribe of rove beetles.

The oldest known representative of Paederini is Cretobius fangornis. It was discovered in the Kachin State of Northern Myanmar inside Burmese amber.

== Taxonomy ==
=== Subtribes ===
- Acanthoglossina
- Astenina
- Cryptobiina
- Cylindroxystina
- Dolicaonina
- Echiasterina
- Lathrobiina
- Medonina
- Paederina
- Scopaeina
- Stilicina
- Stilicopsina

=== Genera ===
There are currently 28 genera that belong to the tribe Paederini:

- Acalophaena Sharp, 1886^{g b}
- Achenomorphus Motschoulsky, 1858^{g b}
- Astenus Dejean, 1833^{c g b}
- Biocrypta Casey, 1905^{g b}
- Dacnochilus Leconte, 1861^{g b}
- Echiaster Erichson, 1839^{c g b}
- Eustilicus Sharp, 1886^{g b}
- Homaeotarsus Hochhuth, 1851^{c g b}
- Lathrobium (Tetartoppeus) convolutum Watrous, 1980^{i c g b}
- Lissobiops Casey, 1905^{b}
- Lithocharis Dejean, 1833^{i c g b}
- Lobrathium Mulsant & Rey, 1878^{c g b}
- Medon (Platymedon) truncatum Hatch, 1957^{i c g b}
- Megastilicus Casey, 1889^{g b}
- Myrmecosaurus Wasmann, 1909^{g b}
- Ochthephilum Stephens, 1829^{c g b}
- Orus Casey, 1885^{g b}
- Pachystilicus Casey, 1905^{g b}
- Paederus ( Harpopaederus ) xui Peng & Li^{c g b}
- Pseudolathra Casey, 1905^{g b}
- Rugilus Leach, 1819^{c g b}
- Scopaeus Erichson, 1839^{c g b}
- Sphaeronum Sharp, 1876^{g b}
- Stamnoderus Sharp, 1886^{g b}
- Stilicopsis Sachse, 1852^{g b}
- Sunius Stephens, 1829^{i c g b}
- Tetartopeus Czwalina, 1888^{g b}
- Thinocharis Kraatz, 1859^{c g b}

Data sources: i = ITIS, c = Catalogue of Life, g = GBIF, b = Bugguide.net
