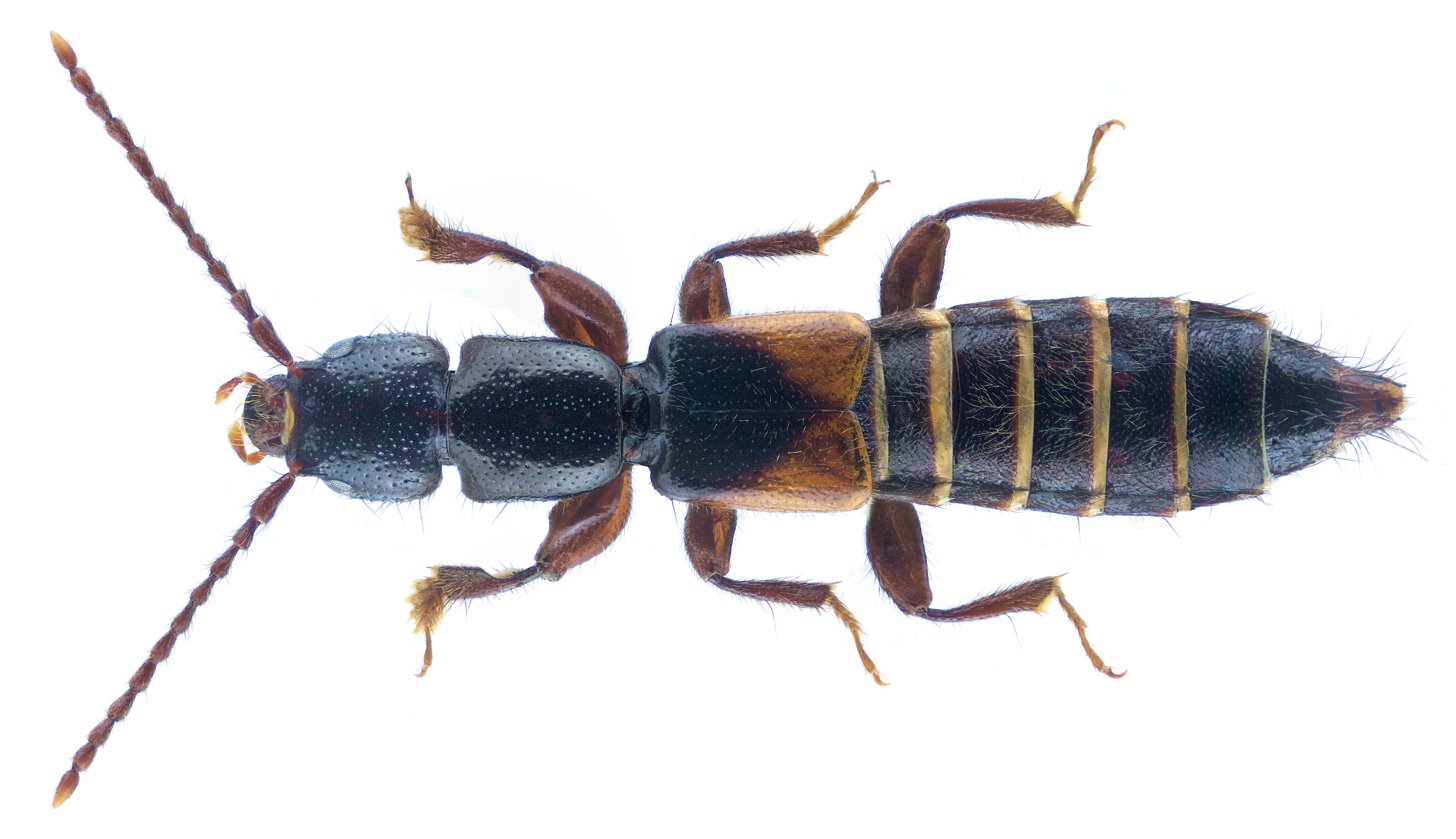

Scientific classification
- Kingdom: Animalia
- Phylum: Arthropoda
- Class: Insecta
- Order: Coleoptera
- Suborder: Polyphaga
- Infraorder: Staphyliniformia
- Family: Staphylinidae
- Subfamily: Paederinae
- Tribe: Lathrobiini
- Subtribe: Lathrobiina
- Genus: Achenium; Leach, 1819

= Achenium =

Genus of beetles

Achenium is a genus of beetle belonging to the family Staphylinidae.

The genus was first described by Leach in 1819.

The species of this genus are found in Europe.

Species:

- Achenium aequatum Erichson, 1840
- Achenium humile (Nicolai, 1822)
