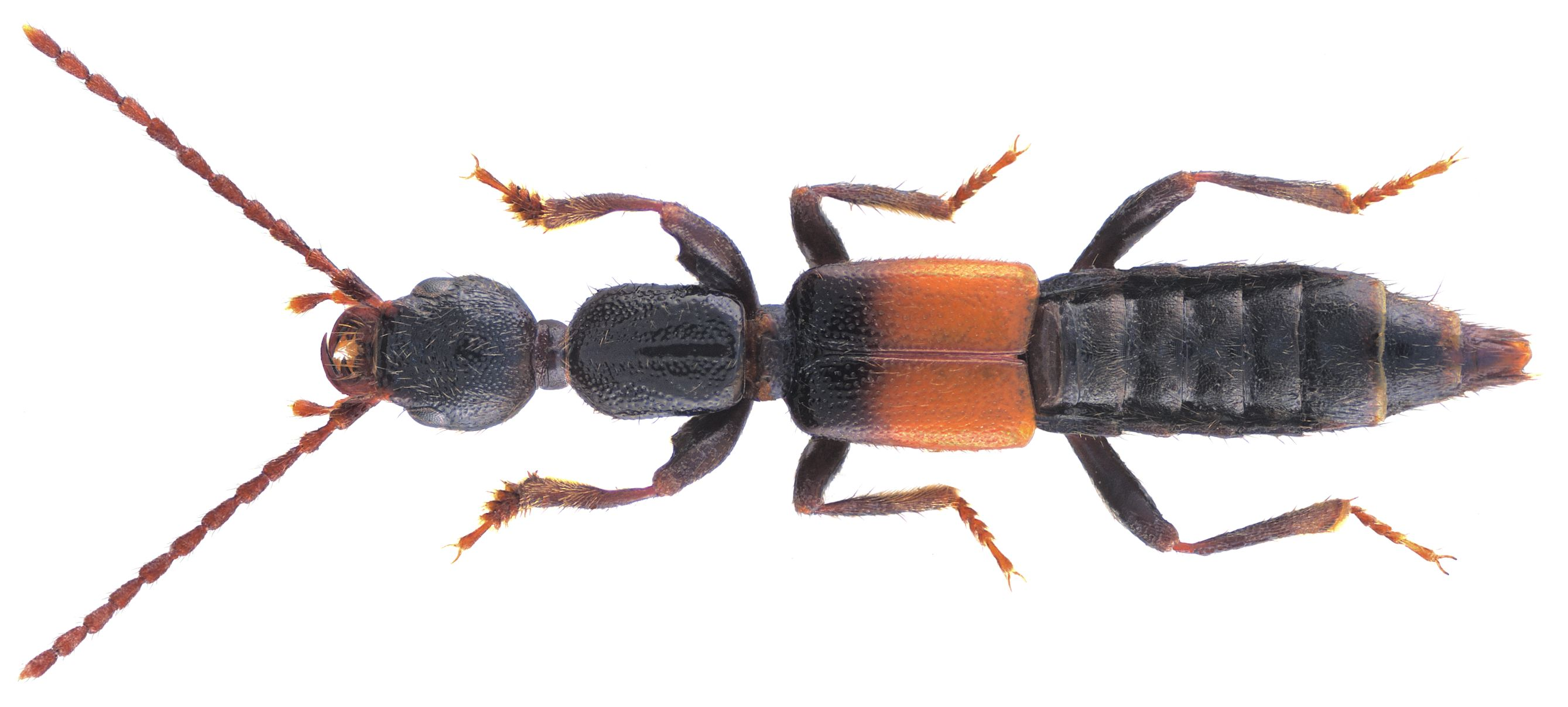
- Platydomene angusticollis

Scientific classification
- Kingdom: Animalia
- Phylum: Arthropoda
- Class: Insecta
- Order: Coleoptera
- Suborder: Polyphaga
- Infraorder: Staphyliniformia
- Family: Staphylinidae
- Subfamily: Paederinae
- Tribe: Lathrobiini
- Subtribe: Lathrobiina; Laporte, 1835

= Lathrobiina =

Subtribe of beetles

Lathrobiina is a subtribe of rove beetles.

== Genera ==
- Acalophaena
- Achenium
- Attaxenus
- Dacnochilus
- Domene
- Dysanabatium
- Enallagium
- Ganarus
- Lathrobium
- Lobrathium
- Micrillus
- Neoscimbalium
- Notobium
- Paederopsis
- Paulianidia
- Phanophilus
- Platybrathium
- Platydomene
- Pseudobium
- Pseudolathra
- Scymbalium
- Scymbalopsis
- Sterocephalus
- Sucoca
- Tetartopeus
- Throbalium
- Tripectenopus
