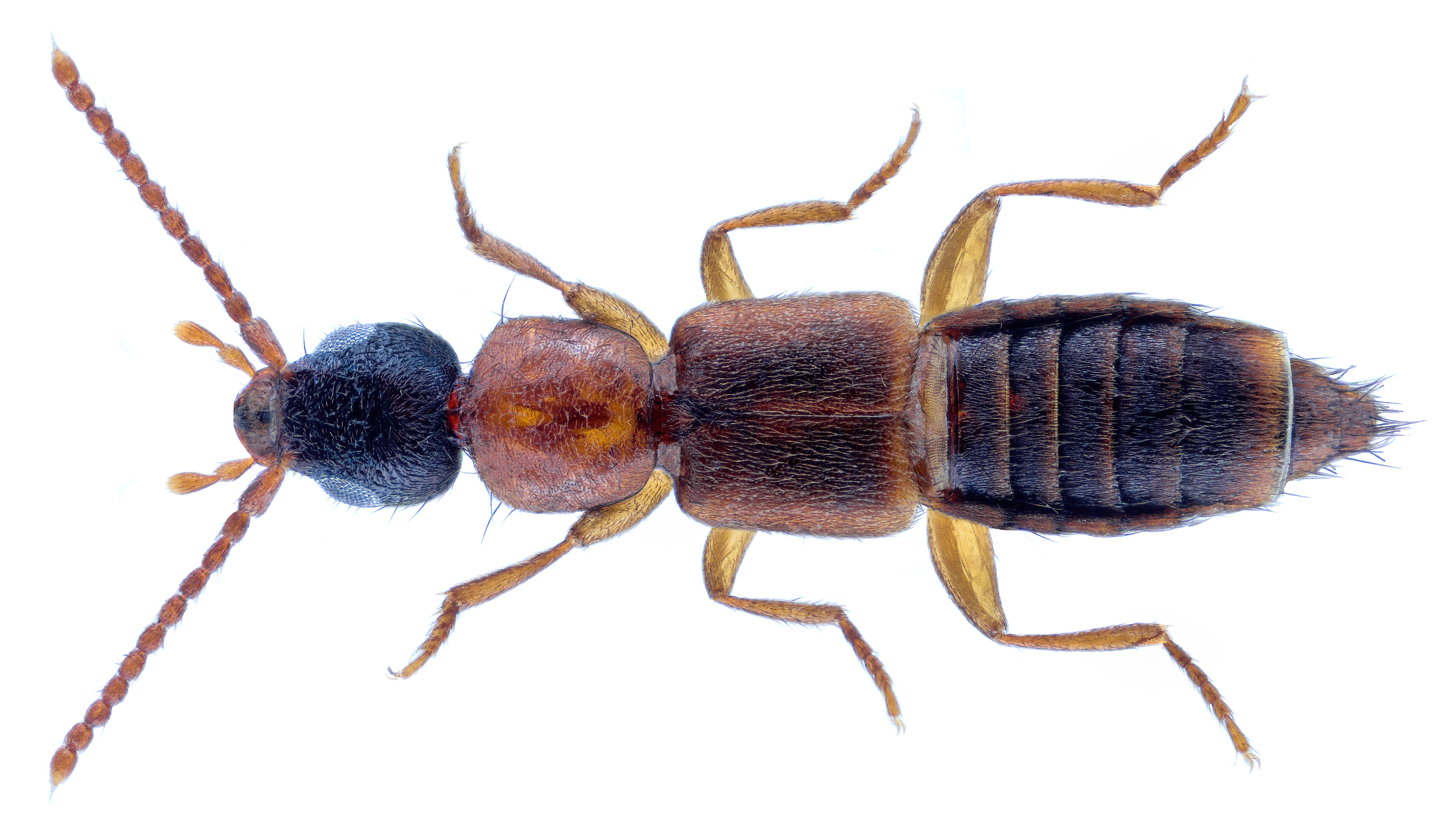
- Lithocharis nigriceps

Scientific classification
- Kingdom: Animalia
- Phylum: Arthropoda
- Class: Insecta
- Order: Coleoptera
- Suborder: Polyphaga
- Infraorder: Staphyliniformia
- Family: Staphylinidae
- Subfamily: Paederinae
- Tribe: Lathrobiini
- Subtribe: Medonina
- Genus: Lithocharis; Dejean, 1833

= Lithocharis (beetle) =

Genus of beetles

Lithocharis is a genus of rove beetles in the family Staphylinidae.

== Species (list incomplete) ==
- Lithocharis alutacea Casey^{g}
- Lithocharis fuscipennis Kraatz, 1859^{g}
- Lithocharis heres Blackwelder^{g}
- Lithocharis nigriceps Kraatz, 1859^{g}
- Lithocharis ochracea Gravenhorst, 1802^{i c g b}
- Lithocharis quadricollis Casey^{g}
- Lithocharis simplex Casey^{g}
- Lithocharis sonorica Casey^{g}
- Lithocharis thoracica (Casey, 1905)^{b}
- Lithocharis tricolor^{b}
- Lithocharis uvida Kraatz^{g}
- Lithocharis vilis Kraatz, 1859^{i c g}
- Lithocharis volans Blackwelder^{g}
- † Lithocharis scottii Scudder 1900^{g}
- † Lithocharis varicolor Heer 1856^{g}

Data sources: i = ITIS, c = Catalogue of Life, g = GBIF, b = Bugguide.net
