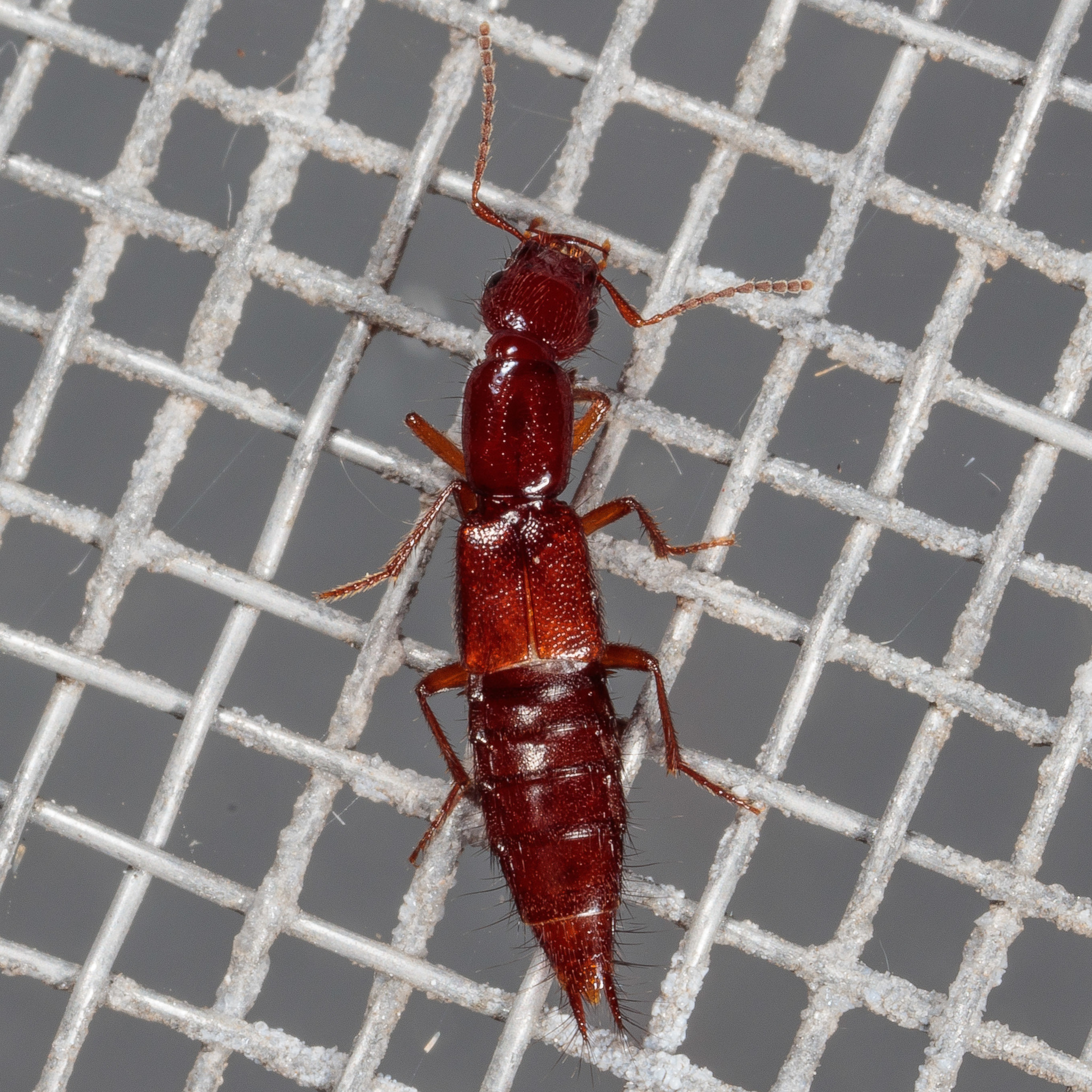
- Biocrypta prospiciens, Texas

Scientific classification
- Kingdom: Animalia
- Phylum: Arthropoda
- Class: Insecta
- Order: Coleoptera
- Suborder: Polyphaga
- Infraorder: Staphyliniformia
- Family: Staphylinidae
- Subfamily: Paederinae
- Tribe: Paederini
- Subtribe: Cryptobiina
- Genus: Biocrypta
- Species: B. prospiciens

Binomial name
- Biocrypta prospiciens (LeConte & J.L., 1878)

Synonyms
- Cryptobium prospiciens J.L.LeConte, 1878

= Biocrypta prospiciens =

Species of beetle

Biocrypta prospiciens is a species of rove beetle in the family Staphylinidae. It is found in North America.
