= Cylindroxystus =

Scientific classification
- Kingdom: Animalia
- Phylum: Arthropoda
- Class: Insecta
- Order: Coleoptera
- Suborder: Polyphaga
- Infraorder: Staphyliniformia
- Family: Staphylinidae
- Subfamily: Paederinae
- Tribe: Lathrobiini
- Subtribe: Cylindroxystina
- Genus: Cylindroxystus; Bierig, 1943

Genus of beetles

Cylindroxystus is a genus of beetles belonging to the family Staphylinidae.

== Selected species ==
- Cylindroxystus alleni Herman, 1991
- Cylindroxystus borinquense (Blackwelder, 1943)
- Cylindroxystus cavus Herman, 1991
- Cylindroxystus crenus Herman, 1991
- Cylindroxystus concavoperculus Herman, 1991
- Cylindroxystus flavus Herman, 1991
- Cylindroxystus longulus Bierig, 1943
- Cylindroxystus luridus Herman, 1991
- Cylindroxystus lyrus Herman, 1991
- Cylindroxystus messus Herman, 1991
- Cylindroxystus pluviosus (Blackwelder, 1943)
- Cylindroxystus redactus Herman, 1991
- Cylindroxystus sinuosus Herman, 1991
