= Acanthoglossa =

Scientific classification
- Kingdom: Animalia
- Phylum: Arthropoda
- Clade: Pancrustacea
- Class: Insecta
- Order: Coleoptera
- Suborder: Polyphaga
- Infraorder: Staphyliniformia
- Family: Staphylinidae
- Subtribe: Medonina
- Genus: Acanthoglossa; Kraatz, 1859

Genus of beetles

Acanthoglossa is a genus of beetles belonging to the family Staphylinidae.

The species of this genus are found in South African Republic.

Species:

- Acanthoglossa aequalis Bernhauer, 1929
- Acanthoglossa apicipennis Cameron, 1948
- Acanthoglossa brachycera Kraatz, 1859
- Acanthoglossa brevicollis (Boheman, 1848)
- Acanthoglossa congoensis Bernhauer, 1943
- Acanthoglossa convexiceps (Bernhauer, 1943)
- Acanthoglossa crassa Coiffait, 1979
- Acanthoglossa csikii Bernhauer, 1915
- Acanthoglossa densior Bernhauer, 1937
- Acanthoglossa deweti Bernhauer, 1915
- Acanthoglossa dundoensis Cameron, 1951
- Acanthoglossa eppelsheimi (Reitter, 1887)
- Acanthoglossa erythraeana Bernhauer, 1915
- Acanthoglossa fauveli Fagel, 1956
- Acanthoglossa gomyi (Lecoq, 1987)
- Acanthoglossa hirta Kraatz, 1859
- Acanthoglossa hirtella (Sharp, 1889)
- Acanthoglossa hova Fauvel, 1905
- Acanthoglossa humilis Fagel, 1965
- Acanthoglossa ifana (Fagel, 1962)
- Acanthoglossa inaequalis Bernhauer, 1929
- Acanthoglossa intermixta (Eppelsheim, 1885)
- Acanthoglossa katonae Bernhauer, 1937
- Acanthoglossa longiceps Fauvel, 1905
- Acanthoglossa longipennis (J.Sahlberg, 1908)
- Acanthoglossa methneri Bernhauer, 1937
- Acanthoglossa nepalica Coiffait, 1982
- Acanthoglossa orientis (Fauvel, 1873)
- Acanthoglossa pennata Fauvel, 1907
- Acanthoglossa peropaca Bernhauer, 1937
- Acanthoglossa pictipennis Cameron, 1934
- Acanthoglossa punica Fauvel, 1901
- Acanthoglossa quadraticeps Cameron, 1927
- Acanthoglossa royi Fagel, 1963
- Acanthoglossa rufa Kraatz, 1859
- Acanthoglossa rufonitida Cameron, 1950
- Acanthoglossa similis Fagel, 1962
- Acanthoglossa testaceipennis Kraatz, 1859
- Acanthoglossa uluguruensis Fagel, 1965
- Acanthoglossa uniformis Fauvel, 1907
