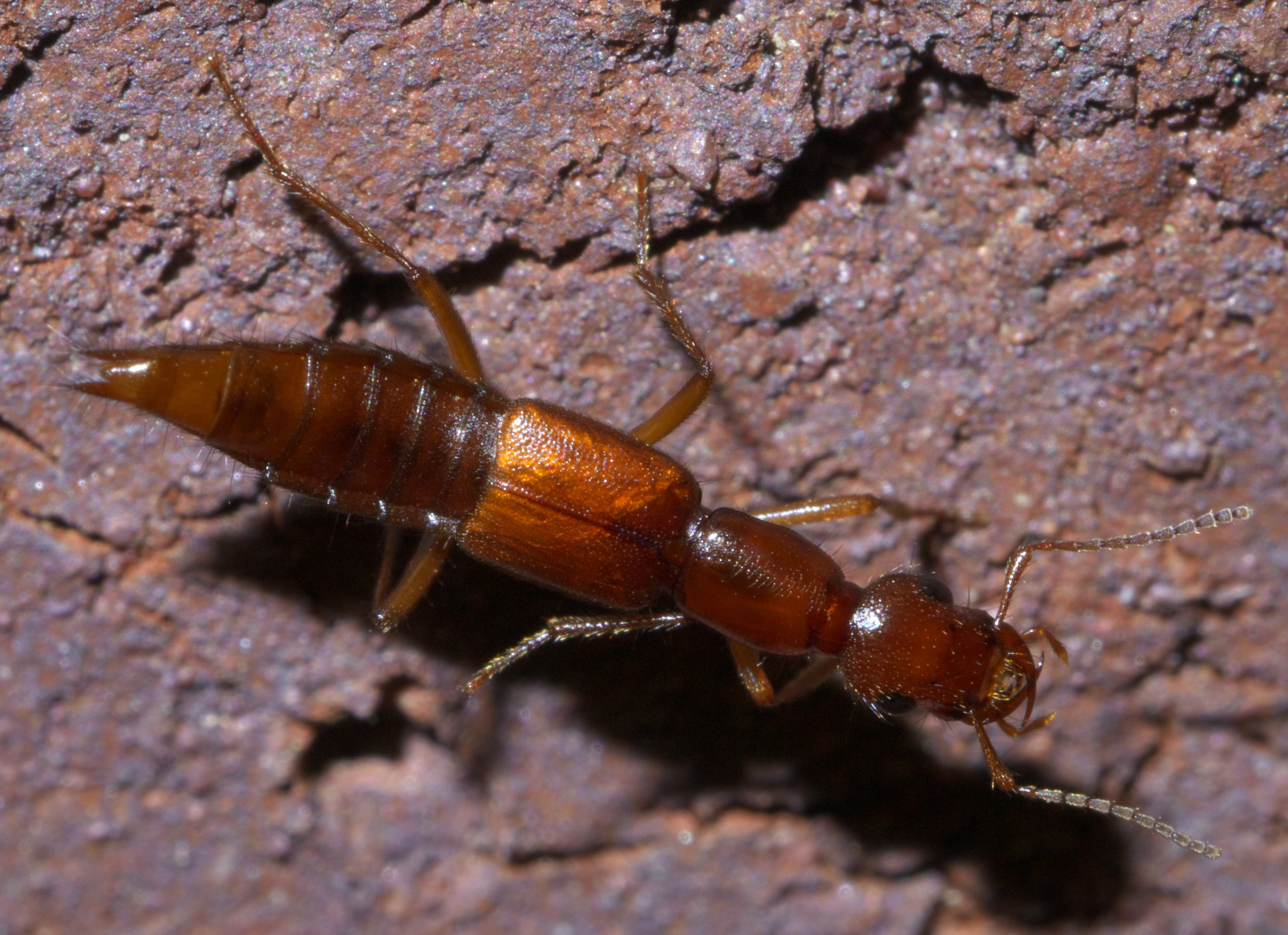
- Biocrypta prospiciens, Oklahoma

Scientific classification
- Kingdom: Animalia
- Phylum: Arthropoda
- Class: Insecta
- Order: Coleoptera
- Suborder: Polyphaga
- Infraorder: Staphyliniformia
- Family: Staphylinidae
- Subfamily: Paederinae
- Tribe: Paederini
- Subtribe: Cryptobiina
- Genus: Biocrypta; Casey, 1905

= Biocrypta =

Genus of beetles

Biocrypta is a genus of rove beetles in the family Staphylinidae. There are more than 20 described species in Biocrypta, found in North, Central, and South America.

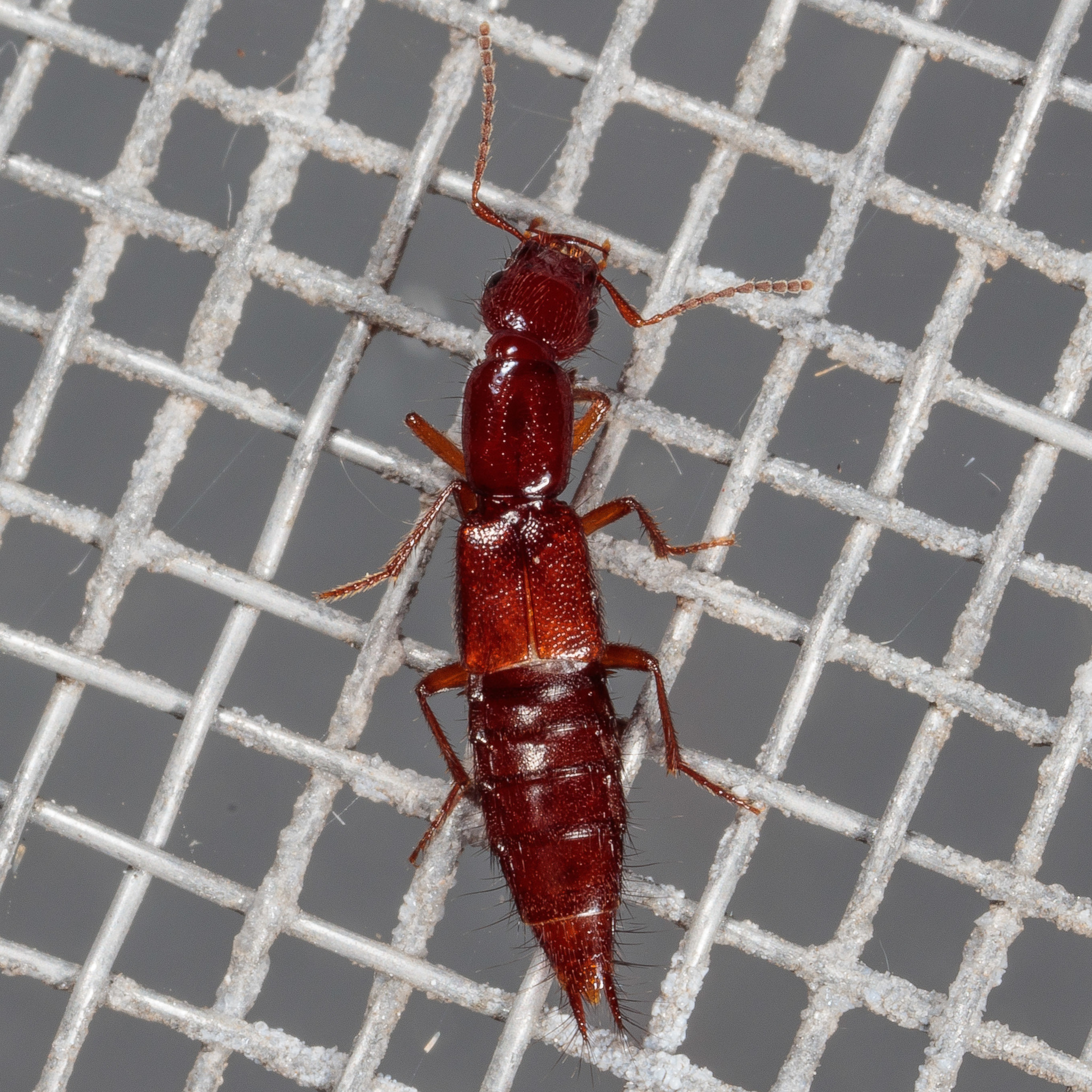
Biocrypta prospiciens, Texas

== Species ==
These 23 species belong to the genus Biocrypta:

- Biocrypta affinis (Sharp, 1885)
- Biocrypta centralis (Sharp, 1885)
- Biocrypta cognata (Sharp, 1885)
- Biocrypta cubensis Blackwelder, 1943
- Biocrypta curtipennis (Bernhauer & K. Schubert, 1912)
- Biocrypta darlingtoni Blackwelder, 1943
- Biocrypta densa Blackwelder, 1943
- Biocrypta dominicana Blackwelder, 1943
- Biocrypta fulvipes (Erichson, 1840)
- Biocrypta grandicollis (Sharp, 1885)
- Biocrypta haitia Blackwelder, 1943
- Biocrypta hastiventris (Bernhauer, 1908)
- Biocrypta hispaniola Blackwelder, 1943
- Biocrypta inquisitor (Sharp, 1885)
- Biocrypta jamaicensis Blackwelder, 1943
- Biocrypta lithocharina (Sharp, 1885)
- Biocrypta magnolia Blatchley, 1917
- Biocrypta mexicana (Sharp, 1885)
- Biocrypta monticola (Sharp, 1885)
- Biocrypta nigriventris (Sharp, 1885)
- Biocrypta prospiciens (LeConte & J.L., 1878)
- Biocrypta sulphuripes (Erichson, 1840)
- Biocrypta trinitatis Blackwelder, 1943
