= Calliderma =

Calliderma may refer to:

- a synonym for Cephalochetus, a genus of beetles in the family Staphylinidae
- Calliderma (fungus), a genus of Basidiomycota in the family Entolomataceae
- Calliderma (echinoderm), an extinct genus of echinoderms in the family Goniasteridae
