= Lathrobium alesi =

Scientific classification
- Kingdom: Animalia
- Phylum: Arthropoda
- Class: Insecta
- Order: Coleoptera
- Suborder: Polyphaga
- Infraorder: Staphyliniformia
- Family: Staphylinidae
- Genus: Lathrobium
- Species: L. alesi

Binomial name
- Lathrobium alesi Assing, 2010

Species of beetle

Lathrobium alesi is a species of rove beetle in the tribe Paederini in the genus Lathrobium that was discovered in 2010.
