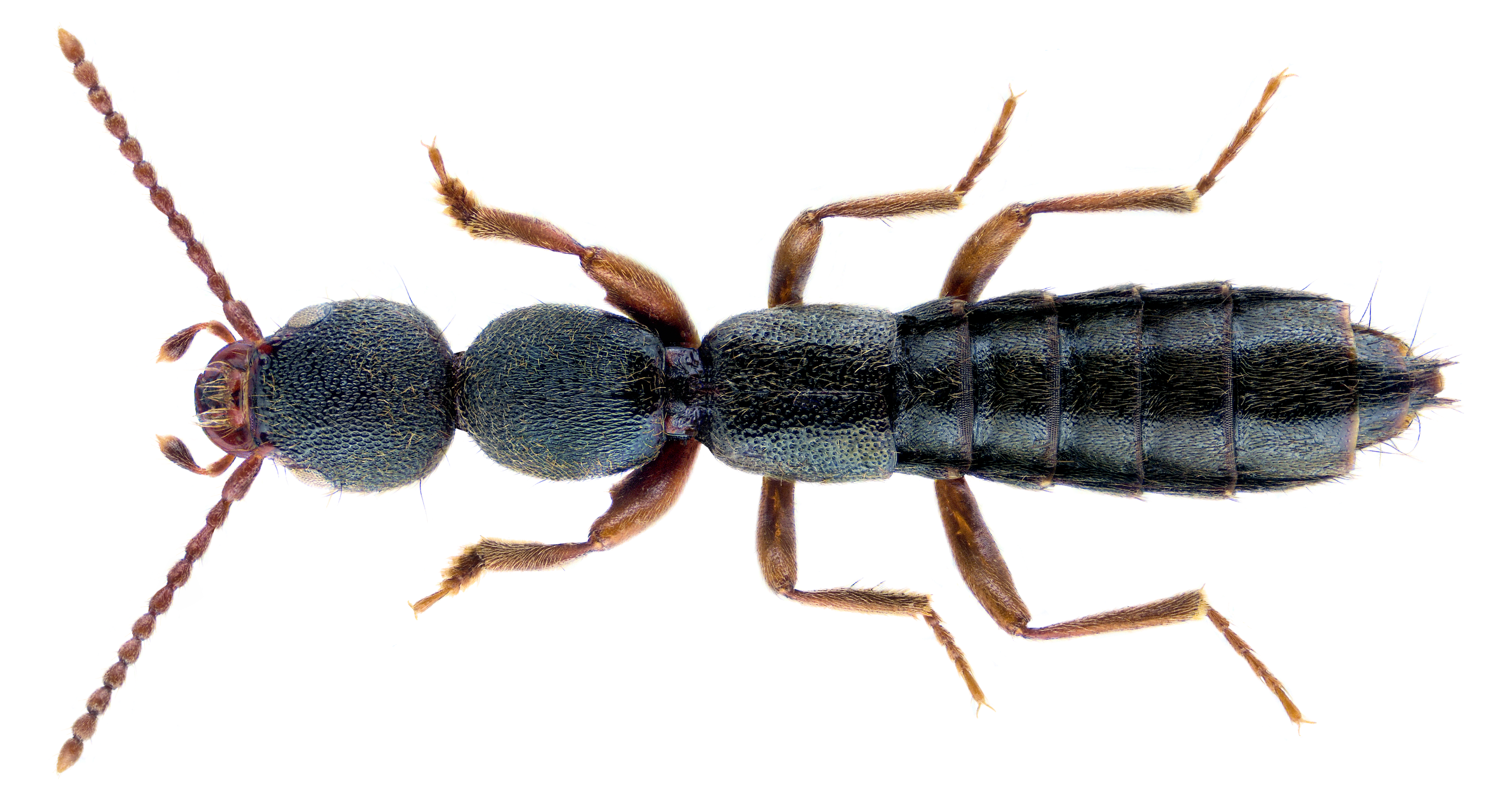

Scientific classification
- Kingdom: Animalia
- Phylum: Arthropoda
- Clade: Pancrustacea
- Class: Insecta
- Order: Coleoptera
- Suborder: Polyphaga
- Infraorder: Staphyliniformia
- Family: Staphylinidae
- Subfamily: Paederinae
- Genus: Domene; Fauvel, 1873

Species
- Several, including: Domene miranda

= Domene =

Genus of beetles

Domene is a genus of rove beetles in the sub family Paederinae.
