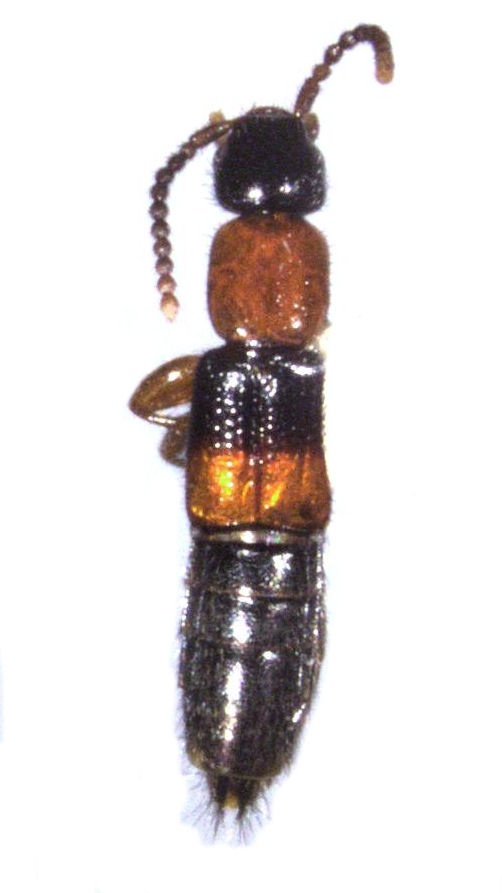

Scientific classification
- Kingdom: Animalia
- Phylum: Arthropoda
- Class: Insecta
- Order: Coleoptera
- Suborder: Polyphaga
- Infraorder: Staphyliniformia
- Family: Staphylinidae
- Subfamily: Paederinae
- Tribe: Lathrobiini
- Subtribe: Lathrobiina
- Genus: Lathrobium; Gravenhorst, 1802

= Lathrobium =

Genus of beetles

Lathrobium is a genus of rove beetles.

== Species ==
- Lathrobium alesi Assing, 2010
- Lathrobium alishanum Assing, 2010
- Lathrobium bisinuatum Assing & Peng in Assing, Peng & Zhao, 2013
- Lathrobium brunnipes (Fabricius, 1792)
- Lathrobium conexum Assing & Peng in Assing, Peng & Zhao, 2013
- Lathrobium coniunctum Assing & Peng in Assing, Peng & Zhao, 2013
- Lathrobium ensigerum Assing & Peng in Assing, Peng & Zhao, 2013
- Lathrobium extraculum Assing, 2010
- Lathrobium follitum Assing, 2010
- Lathrobium guizhouensis Chen, Li & Zhao, 2005
- Lathrobium hastatum Assing & Peng in Assing, Peng & Zhao, 2013
- Lathrobium houhuanicum Assing, 2010
- Lathrobium involutum Assing, 2010
- Lathrobium iunctum Assing & Peng in Assing, Peng & Zhao, 2013
- Lathrobium lingae Peng, Li & Zhao, 2012
- Lathrobium longwangshanense Peng, Li & Zhao, 2012
- Lathrobium nenkaoicum Assing, 2010
- Lathrobium tarokoense Assing, 2010
- Lathrobium uncum Peng, Li & Zhao, 2012
- Lathrobium utriculatum Assing, 2010
