= Cephalochetus elegans =

Scientific classification
- Kingdom: Animalia
- Phylum: Arthropoda
- Class: Insecta
- Order: Coleoptera
- Suborder: Polyphaga
- Infraorder: Staphyliniformia
- Family: Staphylinidae
- Genus: Cephalochetus
- Species: C. elegans

Binomial name
- Cephalochetus elegans Kraatz, 1859.

Synonyms
- Calliderma elegans

Species of beetle

Cephalochetus elegans is a species of rove beetles in the subfamily Paederinae. It is found in Sri Lanka.
