= Ochthephilum elegans =

Scientific classification
- Kingdom: Animalia
- Phylum: Arthropoda
- Class: Insecta
- Order: Coleoptera
- Suborder: Polyphaga
- Infraorder: Staphyliniformia
- Family: Staphylinidae
- Genus: Ochthephilum
- Species: O. elegans

Binomial name
- Ochthephilum elegans Blackburn, 1888

Synonyms
- Cryptobium elegans (Blackburn, 1888)

Species of beetle

Ochthephilum elegans is a species of rove beetle in the subfamily Paederinae. It is found in Australia (East Australia (Victoria) and South Australia).
