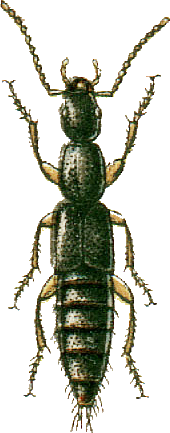
- Cryptobium fracticorne, from Jacobson

Scientific classification
- Kingdom: Animalia
- Phylum: Arthropoda
- Class: Insecta
- Order: Coleoptera
- Suborder: Polyphaga
- Infraorder: Staphyliniformia
- Family: Staphylinidae
- Subfamily: Paederinae
- Tribe: Paederini
- Subtribe: Cryptobiina
- Genus: Ochthephilum; Stephens, 1829

Species
- about 77, including: Ochthephilum elegans; Ochthephilum fracticorne

Synonyms
- Ababactus Sharp, 1885; Cryptobiella Casey, 1905; Cryptobium Mannerheim, 1831; Epimachus Gistel, 1834; Neobactus Blackwelder, 1939

= Ochthephilum =

Genus of beetles

Ochthephilum is a genus of rove beetles in the subfamily Paederinae.
