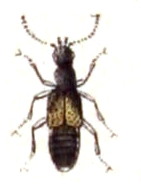
- Astenus gracilis

Scientific classification
- Kingdom: Animalia
- Phylum: Arthropoda
- Class: Insecta
- Order: Coleoptera
- Suborder: Polyphaga
- Infraorder: Staphyliniformia
- Family: Staphylinidae
- Subfamily: Paederinae
- Genus: Astenus; Dejean, 1833

Species
- See text

= Astenus =

Genus of beetle

Astenus is a genus of rove beetles.

== Species ==
Over 480 species are accepted within Astenus, arranged within several subgenera. Additionally, some species have subspecies.

=== Astenus (Astenopleuritus) ===
- Astenus (Astenopleuritus) caspiracus Coiffait, 1982
- Astenus (Astenopleuritus) emodensis Coiffait, 1982
- Astenus (Astenopleuritus) flavescens Scheerpeltz, 1933
- Astenus (Astenopleuritus) gratellus (Fauvel, 1879)
- Astenus (Astenopleuritus) leptocerus (Eppelsheim, 1895)
- Astenus (Astenopleuritus) marginalis Cameron, 1931
- Astenus (Astenopleuritus) melanurus (Küster, 1853)
- Astenus (Astenopleuritus) pulchripennis Cameron, 1931
- Astenus (Astenopleuritus) semibrunneus Cameron, 1931
- Astenus (Astenopleuritus) simlaensis Cameron, 1931
- Astenus (Astenopleuritus) suturalis Cameron, 1931

=== Astenus (Astenus) ===
- Astenus (Astenus) adonis Coiffait, 1960
- Astenus (Astenus) aegyptiacus Coiffait, 1971
- Astenus (Astenus) aequivocus (Wollaston, 1860)
- Astenus (Astenus) algarvensis Coiffait, 1969
- Astenus (Astenus) anguinus (Baudi di Selve, 1848)
  - Astenus (Astenus) anguinus anguinus (Baudi di Selve, 1848)
  - Astenus (Astenus) anguinus oblongicollis C.Koch, 1940
- Astenus (Astenus) angulatus (Sharp, 1874)
- Astenus (Astenus) asper (Aubé, 1850)
- Astenus (Astenus) assingi Bordoni, 1994
- Astenus (Astenus) baali Coiffait, 1960
- Astenus (Astenus) berberus Coiffait, 1960
- Astenus (Astenus) bhotius Coiffait, 1978
- Astenus (Astenus) bimaculatus (Erichson, 1840)
  - Astenus (Astenus) bimaculatus auliensis Coiffait, 1984
  - Astenus (Astenus) bimaculatus bimaculatus (Erichson, 1840)
  - Astenus (Astenus) bimaculatus cinguliventris C.Koch, 1936
- Astenus (Astenus) blinsteini Coiffait, 1969
- Astenus (Astenus) bucharensis Bernhauer, 1902
- Astenus (Astenus) bulgaricus Coiffait, 1971
- Astenus (Astenus) cachemiricus Coiffait, 1982
- Astenus (Astenus) calpensis Coiffait, 1971
- Astenus (Astenus) carteyus Coiffait, 1960
- Astenus (Astenus) catalanus Coiffait, 1980
- Astenus (Astenus) circumflexus Jarrige, 1952
- Astenus (Astenus) cribrellus (Baudi di Selve, 1870)
- Astenus (Astenus) dakini Coiffait, 1978
- Astenus (Astenus) dimidiatus (Wollaston, 1864)
- Astenus (Astenus) dogueti Coiffait, 1980
- Astenus (Astenus) estrelensis Coiffait, 1969
- Astenus (Astenus) fageli Coiffait, 1960
  - Astenus (Astenus) fageli fageli Coiffait, 1960
  - Astenus (Astenus) fageli luteomarginatus Coiffait, 1969
- Astenus (Astenus) fallax (Saulcy, 1865)
- Astenus (Astenus) fauveli (Eppelsheim, 1888)
- Astenus (Astenus) filum (Aubé, 1850)
- Astenus (Astenus) flavus (Kraatz, 1859)
- Astenus (Astenus) gaditanus Bordoni, 1983
- Astenus (Astenus) gattoi Cameron, 1910
- Astenus (Astenus) gracilicornis (Luze, 1904)
- Astenus (Astenus) gracilis (Paykull, 1789)
- Astenus (Astenus) gracilitarsis Coiffait, 1973
- Astenus (Astenus) hastatus Coiffait, 1971
- Astenus (Astenus) hervei Coiffait, 1960
- Astenus (Astenus) immaculatus Stephens, 1833
- Astenus (Astenus) indicus (Kraatz, 1859)
  - Astenus (Astenus) indicus conradsi Bernhauer, 1937
  - Astenus (Astenus) indicus indicus (Kraatz, 1859)
- Astenus (Astenus) italicus Coiffait, 1960
- Astenus (Astenus) jarrigei Coiffait, 1980
- Astenus (Astenus) jordanicus Coiffait, 1981
- Astenus (Astenus) klapperichi Coiffait, 1980
- Astenus (Astenus) ladakhensis Coiffait, 1982
- Astenus (Astenus) laticeps (Merkl, 1991)
- Astenus (Astenus) lepidulus Normand, 1936
- Astenus (Astenus) leucadiae Bordoni & F.E.Bordoni, 1989
- Astenus (Astenus) libanicus Coiffait, 1971
- Astenus (Astenus) lithocharoides (Solsky, 1874)
- Astenus (Astenus) lucidus Jarrige, 1952
- Astenus (Astenus) lyonessius (Joy, 1908)
- Astenus (Astenus) macrocephalus Coiffait, 1960
- Astenus (Astenus) maculatus Cameron, 1920
- Astenus (Astenus) maculipennis (Kraatz, 1859)
  - Astenus (Astenus) maculipennis maculipennis (Kraatz, 1859)
  - Astenus (Astenus) maculipennis mauritiensis Lecoq, 2002
- Astenus (Astenus) marocanus Coiffait, 1971
- Astenus (Astenus) megacephalus (Wollaston, 1864)
  - Astenus (Astenus) megacephalus coiffaiti Israelson, 1971
  - Astenus (Astenus) megacephalus gomerensis (Wollaston, 1865)
  - Astenus (Astenus) megacephalus megacephalus (Wollaston, 1864)
- Astenus (Astenus) melanopygus (Eppelsheim, 1886)
- Astenus (Astenus) menozzii C.Koch, 1937
- Astenus (Astenus) misellus (Mulsant & Rey, 1880)
- Astenus (Astenus) morvani Jarrige, 1971
- Astenus (Astenus) nepalensis Coiffait, 1975
- Astenus (Astenus) nepalicus Herman, 2003
- Astenus (Astenus) nigromaculatus (Motschulsky, 1858)
- Astenus (Astenus) obliquus Jarrige, 1952
- Astenus (Astenus) pakistanus Coiffait, 1982
- Astenus (Astenus) pallidulus (Wollaston, 1864)
- Astenus (Astenus) phenicius Coiffait, 1960
- Astenus (Astenus) pictipennis Fauvel, 1900
- Astenus (Astenus) pictiventris Normand, 1938
- Astenus (Astenus) porosus (Sharp, 1889)
- Astenus (Astenus) pourtoyi Coiffait, 1960
- Astenus (Astenus) procerus (Gravenhorst, 1806)
- Astenus (Astenus) pseudomegacephalus Israelson, 1971
- Astenus (Astenus) puglianus Coiffait, 1960
- Astenus (Astenus) pulchellus (Heer, 1839)
- Astenus (Astenus) romanus Coiffait, 1960
- Astenus (Astenus) rufopacus Reitter, 1909
- Astenus (Astenus) serpentinus (Motschulsky, 1858)
- Astenus (Astenus) suffusus (Sharp, 1874)
- Astenus (Astenus) temperei Coiffait, 1971
- Astenus (Astenus) thaboris (Saulcy, 1865)
- Astenus (Astenus) theodoridesi Jarrige, 1971
- Astenus (Astenus) thoracicus (Baudi di Selve, 1857)
  - Astenus (Astenus) thoracicus thoracicus (Baudi di Selve, 1857)
  - Astenus (Astenus) thoracicus villiersi C.Koch, 1941
- Astenus (Astenus) transversofasciatus Coiffait, 1980
- Astenus (Astenus) unicolor (Mulsant & Rey, 1878)
- Astenus (Astenus) uniformis (Jacquelin du Val, 1853)
- Astenus (Astenus) uyttenboogaarti Bernhauer, 1928
- Astenus (Astenus) varians Cameron, 1931
- Astenus (Astenus) walkeri Fauvel, 1900
- Astenus (Astenus) wittmeri Coiffait, 1979

=== Astenus (Eurysunius) ===
- Astenus (Eurysunius) affimbriatus Assing, 2014
- Astenus (Eurysunius) alcarazae Assing, 2003
- Astenus (Eurysunius) atlasicus Coiffait, 1969
- Astenus (Eurysunius) beirensis Coiffait, 1973
- Astenus (Eurysunius) bicoloratus Assing, 2002
- Astenus (Eurysunius) brachati Assing, 2011
- Astenus (Eurysunius) breuili Jarrige, 1952
- Astenus (Eurysunius) callaecianus Coiffait, 1971
- Astenus (Eurysunius) carinatus Coiffait, 1969
- Astenus (Eurysunius) cerrutii Coiffait, 1960
- Astenus (Eurysunius) colasi Coiffait, 1960
- Astenus (Eurysunius) collaris (Fauvel, 1873)
- Astenus (Eurysunius) contestanus Coiffait, 1980
- Astenus (Eurysunius) corsicus Coiffait, 1960
- Astenus (Eurysunius) curtulus (Erichson, 1840)
- Astenus (Eurysunius) deharvengi Coiffait, 1980
- Astenus (Eurysunius) focarillei Coiffait, 1960
- Astenus (Eurysunius) goeki AnlaÅŸ, 2017
- Astenus (Eurysunius) graecus Reitter, 1909
- Astenus (Eurysunius) gusarovi AnlaÅŸ, 2015
- Astenus (Eurysunius) hexatrichius Coiffait, 1980
- Astenus (Eurysunius) hispanicus Coiffait, 1980
- Astenus (Eurysunius) honazicus AnlaÅŸ, 2015
- Astenus (Eurysunius) ilgazi AnlaÅŸ, 2016
- Astenus (Eurysunius) knischi Bernhauer, 1928
- Astenus (Eurysunius) kocheri Jarrige, 1952
- Astenus (Eurysunius) kochi Bernhauer, 1936
- Astenus (Eurysunius) kociani Assing, 2015
- Astenus (Eurysunius) kumlutasi AnlaÅŸ, 2015
- Astenus (Eurysunius) kyrnosus Coiffait, 1960
- Astenus (Eurysunius) latus (Rosenhauer, 1856)
- Astenus (Eurysunius) martinezii (UhagÃ³n, 1876)
- Astenus (Eurysunius) mateui Coiffait, 1960
- Astenus (Eurysunius) melendizicus AnlaÅŸ, 2018
- Astenus (Eurysunius) minos Assing, 2003
- Astenus (Eurysunius) myrmecophilus (Wollaston, 1864)
- Astenus (Eurysunius) occiduus Assing, 2007
- Astenus (Eurysunius) orgeli AnlaÅŸ, 2015
- Astenus (Eurysunius) paganettii Bernhauer, 1928
- Astenus (Eurysunius) panousei Coiffait, 1969
- Astenus (Eurysunius) paphlagonicus Assing, 2002
- Astenus (Eurysunius) paradoxus (Eppelsheim, 1878)
- Astenus (Eurysunius) platynotus (Saulcy, 1865)
- Astenus (Eurysunius) platyphtalmus Coiffait, 1971
- Astenus (Eurysunius) rhodicus Assing, 2013
- Astenus (Eurysunius) sandiklicus AnlaÅŸ, 2014
- Astenus (Eurysunius) schatzmayri Bernhauer, 1929
- Astenus (Eurysunius) schrami Coiffait, 1960
- Astenus (Eurysunius) segurae Assing, 2003
- Astenus (Eurysunius) setifer Cameron, 1930
- Astenus (Eurysunius) setiger (Vauloger de Beaupré, 1897)
- Astenus (Eurysunius) sexsetosus Assing, 2002
- Astenus (Eurysunius) shavrini Assing, 2010
- Astenus (Eurysunius) siculus Fauvel, 1900
- Astenus (Eurysunius) sultanicus Assing, 2010
- Astenus (Eurysunius) thessalonicus Coiffait, 1971
- Astenus (Eurysunius) thripticus Assing, 2013
- Astenus (Eurysunius) trisetulosus Coiffait, 1971
- Astenus (Eurysunius) tristis (Erichson, 1840)
- Astenus (Eurysunius) truncatus Coiffait, 1971
- Astenus (Eurysunius) vaucheri Jarrige, 1952
- Astenus (Eurysunius) velebiticus Reitter, 1909
- Astenus (Eurysunius) wunderlei Assing, 2014

=== Astenus (Mecognathus) ===
- Astenus (Mecognathus) ampliventris (Reitter, 1900)
- Astenus (Mecognathus) chimaera (Wollaston, 1854)
- Astenus (Mecognathus) wollastoni Coiffait, 1971

=== Subgenus unspecified ===
- Astenus aberlenci Janák & Lecoq, 2007
- Astenus abessinus Bernhauer, 1915
- Astenus albipes Cameron, 1928
- Astenus alluaudi (Fauvel, 1905)
- Astenus altivagans Bernhauer, 1939
- Astenus ambondrombe Janák & Lecoq, 2007
- Astenus ambrensis Janák, 2008
- Astenus ambulans Lea, 1923
- Astenus americanus (Casey, 1905)
- Astenus amicus (Sharp, 1876)
- Astenus andrewesi Cameron, 1931
- Astenus andringitra Janák & Lecoq, 2007
- Astenus andringitranus Janák & Lecoq, 2007
- Astenus angolensis Cameron, 1950
- Astenus angusticeps Scheerpeltz, 1976
- Astenus angusticollis Cameron, 1950
- Astenus angustipennis Bernhauer, 1942
- Astenus anjouanensis Lecoq, 1996
- Astenus ankaratrensis Lecoq, 1996
- Astenus apiciflavus (Lea, 1904)
- Astenus arizonianus (Casey, 1905)
- Astenus arrowi Bernhauer, 1939
- Astenus asitus D.N.Biswas & Sen Gupta, 1983
- Astenus attenuatus (Erichson, 1840)
- Astenus australicus Bernhauer, 1908
- Astenus baloghi Last, 1980
- Astenus barbarae C.Koch, 1941
- Astenus bicinctus (Fauvel, 1879)
- Astenus bicoloripennis Lecoq, 1996
- Astenus bifidus Lecoq, 1996
- Astenus binotatus (Say, 1823)
- Astenus biplagiatus (Motschulsky, 1858)
- Astenus birmanus Fauvel, 1895
- Astenus biroi Last, 1980
- Astenus bisalicus D.N.Biswas & Sen Gupta, 1983
- Astenus bisignatus (Erichson, 1840)
- Astenus bispinus (Motschulsky, 1858)
- Astenus bivittatus (Eppelsheim, 1885)
- Astenus bonus Last, 1980
- Astenus borbonicus Janák & Lecoq, 2007
- Astenus brasilianus Bernhauer, 1908
- Astenus bredoi Bernhauer, 1943
- Astenus breviceps Wendeler, 1956
- Astenus brevipennis (Austin, 1877)
- Astenus brevipes (Sharp, 1874)
- Astenus bryanti Cameron, 1941
- Astenus buehleri Scheerpeltz, 1957
- Astenus burgeoni Bernhauer, 1934
- Astenus californicus (Austin, 1877)
- Astenus cameroni Scheerpeltz, 1933
- Astenus capitalis Fauvel, 1889
- Astenus castaneus Cameron, 1920
- Astenus cephalus Last, 1980
- Astenus ceylonicus Cameron, 1931
- Astenus chapmani Bernhauer, 1937
- Astenus cheesmani Cameron, 1937
- Astenus chloroticus (Sharp, 1874)
- Astenus cinctiventris (Sharp, 1886)
- Astenus cinctus (Say, 1831)
- Astenus clementi Lecoq, 1996
- Astenus coarctatus (Erichson, 1840)
- Astenus cognatus (Sharp, 1886)
- Astenus comoranus Lecoq, 1996
- Astenus comorensis Lecoq, 1996
- Astenus concolor (Kraatz, 1859)
- Astenus condei Wendeler, 1956
- Astenus cruzensis Coiffait, 1985
- Astenus cubensis Blackwelder, 1943
- Astenus cylindricus (W.J.MacLeay, 1871)
- Astenus cyprius Lokay, 1919
- †Astenus demersus (C.Heyden & L.Heyden, 1866)
- Astenus descarpentriesi Jarrige, 1978
- Astenus diegoensis Lecoq, 1996
- Astenus difficilis Cameron, 1951
- Astenus discopunctatus (Say, 1831)
- Astenus distinctus Cameron, 1947
- Astenus diversiventris Cameron, 1943
- Astenus dodo Janák & Lecoq, 2007
- Astenus drescheri Cameron, 1936
- Astenus duflosi Lecoq, 1996
- Astenus elevator Fauvel, 1907
- Astenus elongatus Janák & Lecoq, 2007
- Astenus epipleuralis Cameron, 1950
- Astenus eppelsheimi Bernhauer & K.Schubert, 1912
- Astenus erinaceus Fagel, 1965
- Astenus euryalus Fernando, 1959
- Astenus explicatus Last, 1984
- Astenus fasciatus (Solsky, 1871)
- Astenus favosus (Lea, 1906)
- Astenus filiventris (Sharp, 1886)
- Astenus fimetarius Fauvel, 1907
- Astenus fisheri Janák & Lecoq, 2007
- Astenus flavicollis Bernhauer, 1912
- Astenus flavipennis Bernhauer, 1927
- Astenus flavolineatus Bernhauer, 1937
- Astenus fletcheri Wendeler, 1927
- Astenus formosanus Bernhauer, 1939
- Astenus fortepunctatus Fagel, 1965
- Astenus foveapennis Wendeler, 1956
- Astenus frater Cameron, 1941
- Astenus fraterculus Bernhauer, 1937
- Astenus friebi Bernhauer, 1927
- Astenus fusciceps (Casey, 1905)
- Astenus galapagoensis Coiffait, 1981
- Astenus geniculatus Last, 1980
- Astenus gerardi Bernhauer, 1932
- Astenus ghumensis Cameron, 1943
- Astenus gracilentus (Fauvel, 1879)
- Astenus gratiosus Cameron, 1951
- Astenus gratus Cameron, 1931
- Astenus guttalis Cameron, 1930
- Astenus guttipennis Fauvel, 1907
- Astenus guttulus (Fauvel, 1877)
- Astenus h-signatus Cameron, 1914
- Astenus hackeri (Lea, 1906)
- Astenus hammondi Lecoq, 1996
- Astenus hindostanus Cameron, 1919
- Astenus horni Bernhauer, 1939
- Astenus horridus Rougemont, 2018
- Astenus inconstans (Casey, 1905)
- Astenus indri Janák & Lecoq, 2007
- Astenus inermis Lecoq, 1996
- Astenus insignis Bernhauer, 1939
- Astenus interjectus Last, 1984
- Astenus itremo Lecoq, 1996
- Astenus ivohibensis Lecoq, 1996
- Astenus japonicus Zhao, Mei-Jun & Sakai, 1999
- Astenus jhopus D.N.Biswas & Sen Gupta, 1983
- Astenus jocquei Lecoq, 1996
- Astenus julus Fernando, 1959
- Astenus juvus Blackwelder, 1943
- Astenus kashmiricus Cameron, 1943
- Astenus kilimanjarensis Fagel, 1965
- Astenus kivuensis Bernhauer, 1934
- Astenus kokodanus Cameron, 1937
- Astenus kraatzi Bernhauer, 1902
- Astenus lacertosus Lecoq, 1996
- Astenus latecingulatus Bernhauer, 1939
- Astenus lateralis (Erichson, 1840)
- Astenus lateripennis Bernhauer, 1939
- Astenus latifrons (Sharp, 1874)
- Astenus lepesmei Bernhauer, 1942
- Astenus limbatus (Erichson, 1840)
- Astenus linearis (Erichson, 1840)
- Astenus longiceps (R.F.Sahlberg, 1847)
- Astenus longicollis (Eppelsheim, 1885)
- Astenus longinasus (Sharp, 1886)
- Astenus longiusculus (Mannerheim, 1830)
- Astenus longospiculus Lecoq, 1996
- Astenus louwerensi Cameron, 1940
- Astenus luteus Wendeler, 1956
- Astenus luzonicus Bernhauer, 1919
- Astenus machadoi Cameron, 1950
- Astenus majorinus Lea, 1923
- Astenus mandibularis Lea, 1923
- Astenus manongarivo Janák & Lecoq, 2007
- Astenus marginalis Cameron, 1931
- Astenus marginatus (Sharp, 1876)
- Astenus marginellus Cameron, 1930
- Astenus marmoratus Cameron, 1937
- Astenus mauretanicus Coiffait, 1971
- Astenus mauritianus Janák & Lecoq, 2007
- Astenus mauriticus Janák & Lecoq, 2007
- Astenus methneri Bernhauer, 1937
- Astenus micropterus Bernhauer, 1937
- Astenus microthorax (Fauvel, 1875)
- Astenus minutipennis Wendeler, 1956
- Astenus modestus Bernhauer, 1931
- Astenus montanellus Bernhauer, 1939
- Astenus montanus Herman, 2003
- Astenus naivashanus Cameron, 1950
- Astenus naomii Zhao & Mei-Jun, 1996
- Astenus nevermanni Bernhauer, 1942
- Astenus nilgiriensis Cameron, 1931
- Astenus nisus Fernando, 1959
- Astenus noctivagans Cameron, 1948
- Astenus noctivagus Lea, 1923
- Astenus nodieri Lecoq, 1996
- Astenus notatellus Fauvel, 1907
- Astenus notula Fauvel, 1898
- Astenus notula notula Fauvel, 1898
- Astenus notula notuloides Lecoq, 1996
- Astenus obscureguttatus Cameron, 1950
- Astenus obscurus Cameron, 1931
- Astenus ohbayashii Zhao, Mei-Jun & Sakai, 1997
- Astenus oligopterus Bernhauer, 1934
- Astenus opaculus (Sharp, 1886)
- Astenus ophis Fauvel, 1895
- Astenus orientalis Cameron, 1918
- Astenus ornatellus (Casey, 1905)
- Astenus papuanus Cameron, 1931
- Astenus paranensis (Lynch ArribÃ¡lzaga, 1884)
- Astenus parvipennis Bernhauer, 1922
- Astenus parvispinosus Janák, 2008
- Astenus pauliani Lecoq, 1996
- Astenus pectinatus (Fauvel, 1878)
- Astenus peraffinis Cameron, 1931
- Astenus perangustoides Janák & Lecoq, 2007
- Astenus perangustus Fauvel, 1905
- Astenus peregrinus Bernhauer, 1939
- Astenus peringueyi Fagel, 1961
- Astenus perrieri Fauvel, 1905
- Astenus persimilis Cameron, 1952
- Astenus peteri Rougemont, 2018
- Astenus peyrierasi Lecoq, 1996
- Astenus philippinus Bernhauer, 1915
- Astenus pilatei (Sharp, 1886)
- Astenus pleuritus Coiffait, 1976
- Astenus productor Fauvel, 1907
- Astenus prolixus (Erichson, 1840)
- Astenus psilographus Fauvel, 1905
- Astenus puguensis Bernhauer, 1937
- Astenus pulcher Wendeler, 1956
- Astenus punctipennis Fauvel, 1905
- Astenus quadriceps Jarrige, 1960
- Astenus regulus Last, 1980
- Astenus reticollis Fauvel, 1889
- Astenus richardi Jarrige, 1957
- Astenus rigoensis Last, 1980
- Astenus robustulus (Casey, 1905)
- Astenus rudiventris Bernhauer, 1915
- Astenus rufobrunneus Bernhauer, 1939
- Astenus rufopiceus Bernhauer, 1915
- Astenus rufotestaceus Cameron, 1951
- Astenus rufulus Bernhauer, 1934
- Astenus ruteri Lecoq, 1996
- Astenus sakaii Zhao, Mei-Jun & Li-Zhen Li, 1998
- Astenus sanctus (Sharp, 1886)
- Astenus sauteri Bernhauer, 1922
- Astenus schenklingi Bernhauer, 1922
- Astenus scotti Bernhauer, 1922
- Astenus sectator (Casey, 1905)
- Astenus selangorensis Cameron, 1932
- Astenus serpens (Sharp, 1876)
- Astenus serpentarius Cameron, 1930
- Astenus setiferides Newton, 2017
- Astenus setipennis Bernhauer, 1942
- Astenus seydeli Cameron, 1952
- Astenus sharpi Scheerpeltz, 1933
- Astenus shibatai Ito & T., 1995
- Astenus signatellus (Sharp, 1886)
- Astenus signatus (R.F.Sahlberg, 1847)
- Astenus sikkimensis D.N.Biswas, 2003
- Astenus similis (Austin, 1877)
- Astenus simsoni (Lea, 1906)
- Astenus simulans (Casey, 1905)
- Astenus simulator Last, 1980
- Astenus sinoseptentrionalis (Jacot, 1923)
- Astenus sinuaticollis Bierig, 1934
- Astenus spectabilis Bernhauer, 1927
- Astenus spectrum (Casey, 1905)
- Astenus spiculifer Lecoq, 1996
- Astenus spinosus Zhao, Mei-Jun & Sakai, 1997
- Astenus staudingeri Cameron, 1941
- Astenus striativentris Wendeler, 1956
- Astenus striatus Last, 1980
- Astenus strictus (Sharp, 1876)
- Astenus strigiceps (Fauvel, 1879)
- Astenus strigilis (Casey, 1905)
- Astenus subcingulatus Bernhauer, 1939
- Astenus subgrandis Last, 1980
- Astenus submaculatus Cameron, 1937
- Astenus subnitidulus Bernhauer, 1937
- Astenus subnotatus Fauvel, 1904
- Astenus substrictus (Sharp, 1886)
- Astenus subtilicornis Fagel, 1965
- Astenus subtilis (Sharp, 1886)
- Astenus sumatrensis Cameron, 1925
- Astenus sutteri Scheerpeltz, 1957
- Astenus taiwanus Ito & T., 1996
- Astenus tanicus D.N.Biswas & Sen Gupta, 1983
- Astenus taprobanus Cameron, 1919
- Astenus tardus Lea, 1923
- Astenus tenuis (Sharp, 1886)
- Astenus tenuiventris (Casey, 1905)
- Astenus terminalis Cameron, 1931
- Astenus testaceus (Erichson, 1840)
- Astenus thaxteri Cameron, 1941
- Astenus theodorensis Cameron, 1941
- Astenus tricolor Cameron, 1930
- Astenus tricoloricornis Rougemont, 2017
- Astenus trilineatus (Lea, 1904)
- Astenus tropicus Bernhauer, 1915
- Astenus turneri Cameron, 1950
- Astenus uelensides Newton, 2017
- Astenus uelensis Cameron, 1929
- Astenus uluguruensis Bernhauer, 1915
- Astenus uncinatus Lecoq, 1996
- Astenus upis Tottenham, 1953
- Astenus vadoni Lecoq, 1996
- Astenus variegatus (Solsky, 1868)
- Astenus ventralis (Sharp, 1876)
- Astenus vianai Bernhauer, 1939
- Astenus viduus Jarrige, 1978
- Astenus viettei Jarrige, 1957
- Astenus vilhenai Cameron, 1951
- Astenus vilis (Sharp, 1886)
- Astenus vinsoni Lecoq, 1987
- Astenus viperinus Bernhauer, 1915
- Astenus vittatus (Sharp, 1876)
- Astenus walkerianus Bernhauer, 1929
- Astenus yapoensis Cameron, 1950
- Astenus yonezoi Ito & T., 1995
- Astenus zealandicus Cameron, 1945
- Astenus zumpti Bernhauer, 1939
- Astenus zuni (Casey, 1905)
