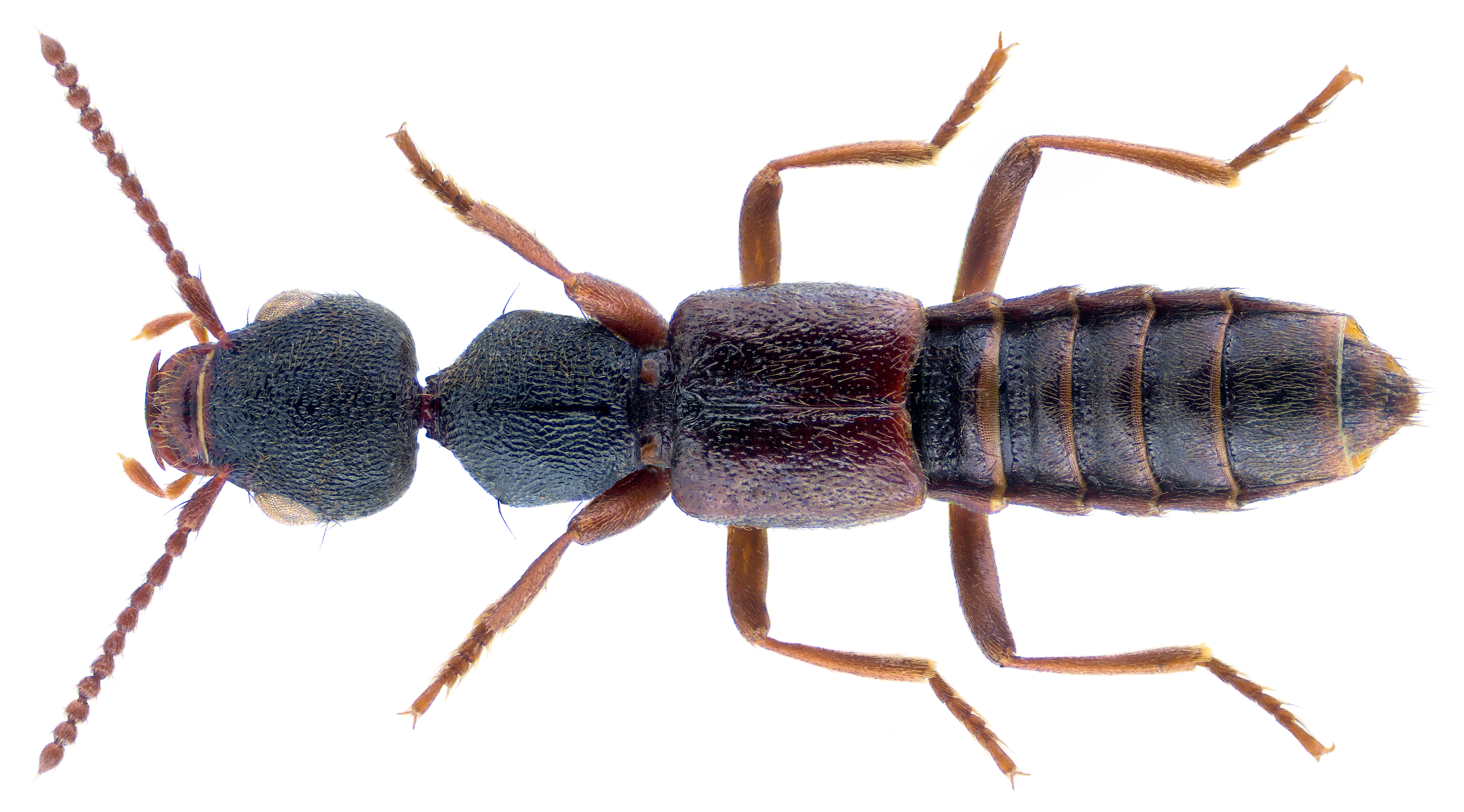

Scientific classification
- Kingdom: Animalia
- Phylum: Arthropoda
- Class: Insecta
- Order: Coleoptera
- Suborder: Polyphaga
- Infraorder: Staphyliniformia
- Family: Staphylinidae
- Genus: Rugilus
- Species: R. rufipes

Binomial name
- Rugilus rufipes (Germar, 1836)

= Rugilus rufipes =

Species of beetle

Rugilus rufipes is a species of rove beetle in the family Staphylinidae. It is commonly found across Europe and parts of North America. These beetles are known for their slender bodies and distinctive red legs, which give the species its name.

== Description ==
Rugilus rufipes can be identified by its elongated body, which measures approximately 5-7 mm in length. The beetle's coloration is primarily dark brown to black, with contrasting red legs and antennae. The elytra are relatively short, exposing several abdominal segments.

== Habitat ==
This species thrives in a variety of habitats, including forest leaf litter, under stones, and in decaying wood. Rugilus rufipes is particularly common in moist environments where organic matter is abundant.

== Behaviour and ecology ==
Rugilus rufipes is a predatory beetle, feeding primarily on other small invertebrates. It is active throughout the year, with peak activity in the warmer months. The beetle plays a crucial role in controlling the populations of soil-dwelling pests.

== Life cycle ==
The life cycle of Rugilus rufipes includes several stages: egg, larva, pupa, and adult. The larvae are similar in appearance to the adults but are smaller and lack fully developed wings. The species undergoes complete metamorphosis, with the entire cycle taking several weeks to complete under optimal conditions.

== Distribution ==
Rugilus rufipes is widely distributed across Europe and has also been reported in various regions of North America. The species is adaptable and can be found in both rural and urban environments.
