= Domene miranda =

Scientific classification
- Kingdom: Animalia
- Phylum: Arthropoda
- Class: Insecta
- Order: Coleoptera
- Suborder: Polyphaga
- Infraorder: Staphyliniformia
- Family: Staphylinidae
- Genus: Domene
- Species: D. miranda

Binomial name
- Domene miranda Assing, 2010

Species of beetle

Domene miranda is a species of rove beetles first found in Turkey.
