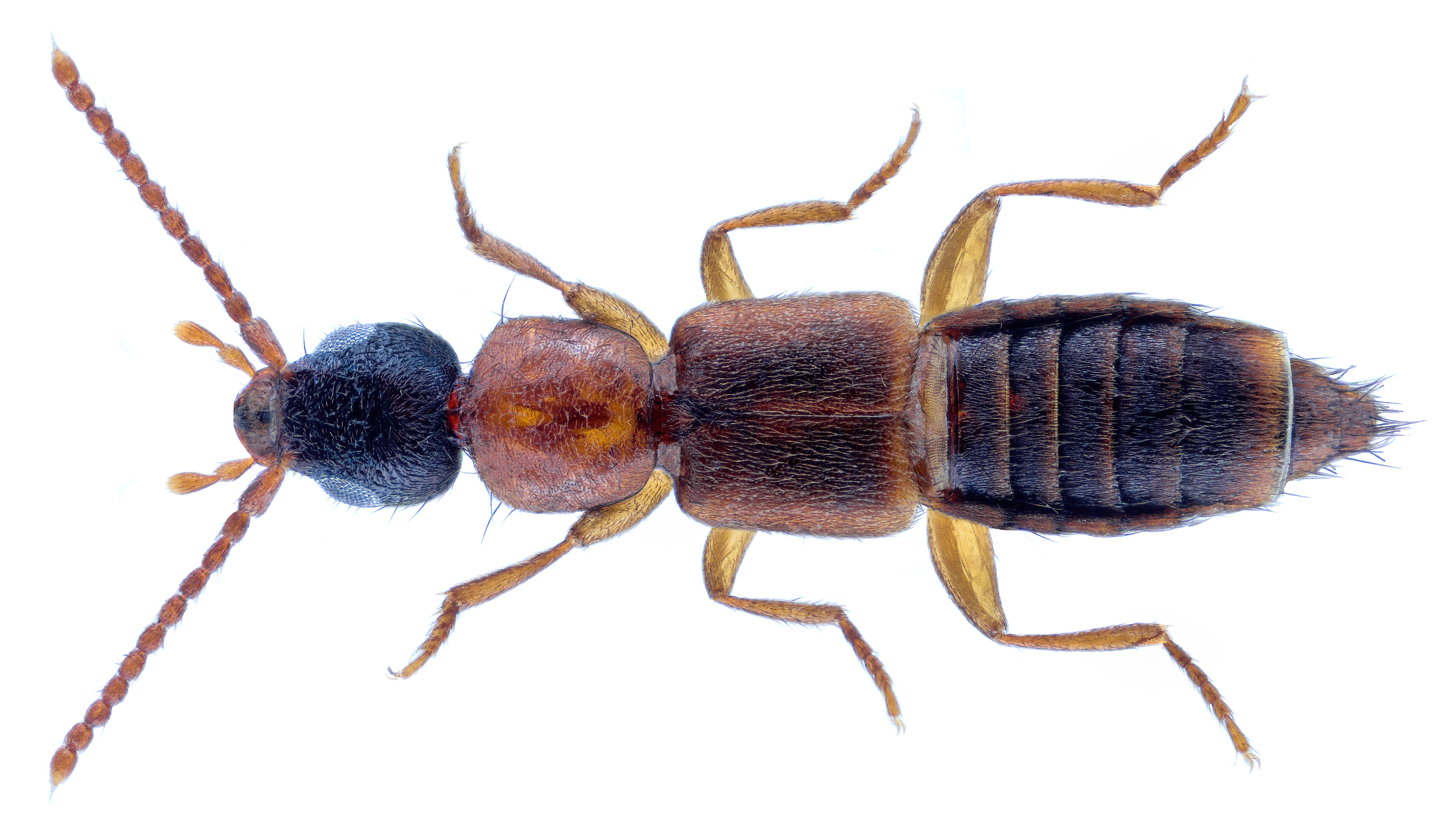

Scientific classification
- Kingdom: Animalia
- Phylum: Arthropoda
- Class: Insecta
- Order: Coleoptera
- Suborder: Polyphaga
- Infraorder: Staphyliniformia
- Family: Staphylinidae
- Genus: Lithocharis
- Species: L. nigriceps

Binomial name
- Lithocharis nigriceps Kraatz, 1859

= Lithocharis nigriceps =

Species of beetle

Lithocharis nigriceps is a species of beetle belonging to the family Staphylinidae.

It has cosmopolitan distribution.
