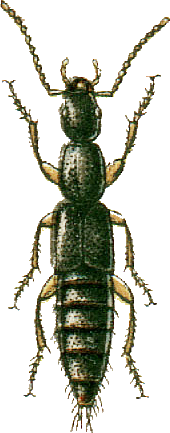

Scientific classification
- Kingdom: Animalia
- Phylum: Arthropoda
- Clade: Pancrustacea
- Class: Insecta
- Order: Coleoptera
- Suborder: Polyphaga
- Infraorder: Staphyliniformia
- Family: Staphylinidae
- Genus: Ochthephilum
- Species: O. fracticorne

Binomial name
- Ochthephilum fracticorne (Paykull, 1800)

= Ochthephilum fracticorne =

Species of beetle

Ochthephilum fracticorne is a species of rove beetle in the family Staphylinidae.

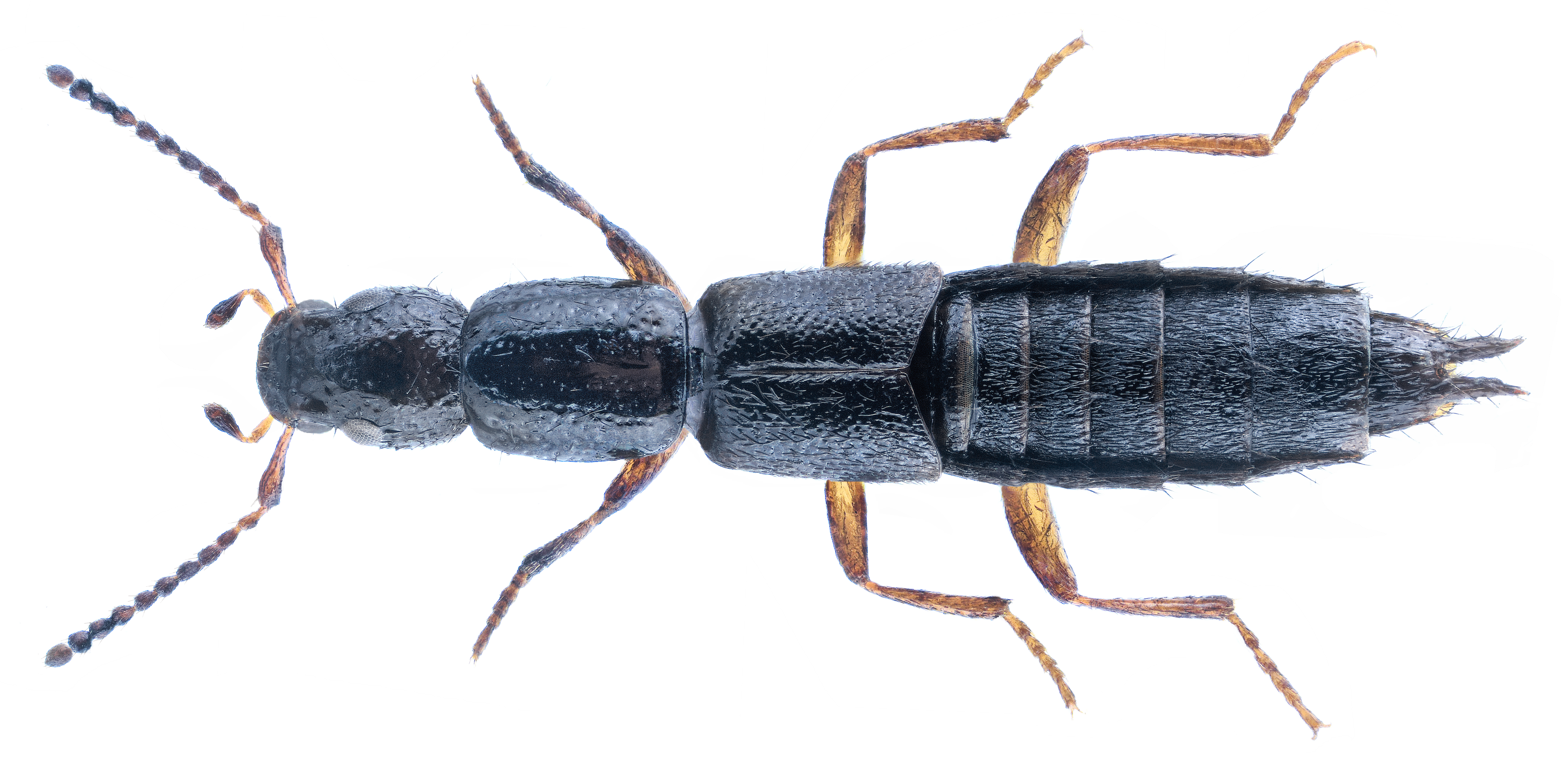
