= Astenus sultanicus =

Scientific classification
- Kingdom: Animalia
- Phylum: Arthropoda
- Class: Insecta
- Order: Coleoptera
- Suborder: Polyphaga
- Infraorder: Staphyliniformia
- Family: Staphylinidae
- Genus: Astenus
- Species: A. sultanicus

Binomial name
- Astenus sultanicus Assing, 2010

Species of beetle

Astenus sultanicus is a species of rove beetles first found in Turkey.
