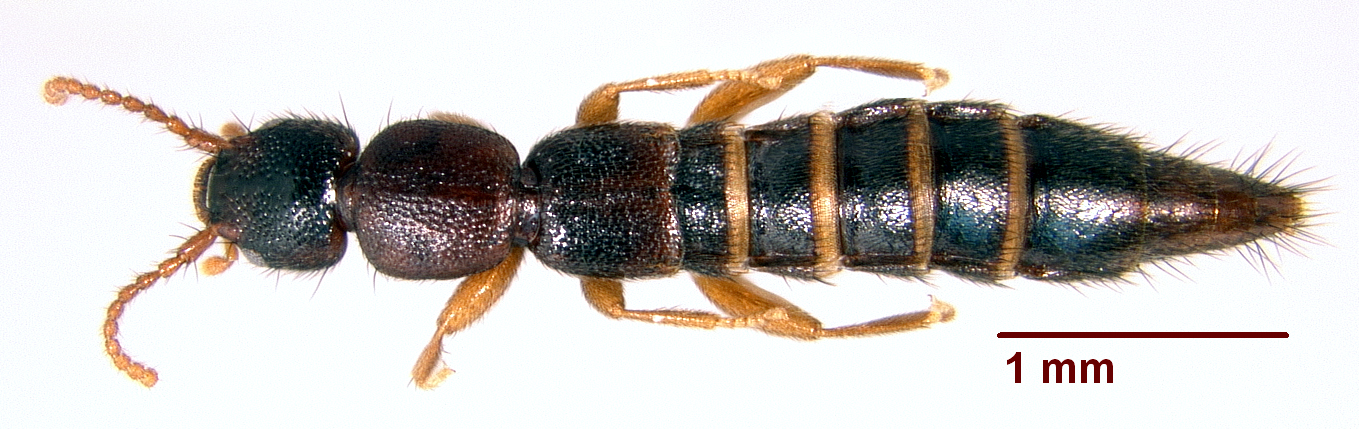
- Sunius rufipes

Scientific classification
- Kingdom: Animalia
- Phylum: Arthropoda
- Class: Insecta
- Order: Coleoptera
- Suborder: Polyphaga
- Infraorder: Staphyliniformia
- Family: Staphylinidae
- Subtribe: Medonina
- Genus: Sunius; Stephens, 1829

= Sunius =

Genus of beetles

Sunius is a genus of rove beetles in the family Staphylinidae. There are more than 60 described species in Sunius.

== Species ==
These 66 species belong to the genus Sunius:

- Caloderma angulatum Casey, 1886
- Caloderma continens Casey, 1886
- Caloderma contractum Casey, 1886
- Caloderma mobile Casey, 1886
- Caloderma reductum Casey, 1886
- Caloderma rugosum Casey, 1886
- Caloderma tantillum Casey, 1886
- Sunius aculeatus Assing, 2005
- Sunius adanensis (Lokay, 1918)
- Sunius akdaghensis Anlaş, 2016
- Sunius algiricus (Coiffait, 1969)
- Sunius amanensis Assing, 2005
- Sunius anophthalmus Hernandez & Garcia, 1992
- Sunius balkarensis Assing, 2001
- Sunius bicolor (Olivier, 1795)
- Sunius bozdaghensis Assing, 2006
- Sunius brachypterus (Gemminger & Harold, 1868)
- Sunius brevipennis (Wollaston, 1864)
- Sunius brevispinosus Assing, 2005
- Sunius cagatayi Anlaş, 2016
- Sunius canariensis (Bernhauer, 1928)
- Sunius catalonicus (Coiffait, 1961)
- Sunius ciceki Anlaş, 2016
- Sunius cercii Anlaş, 2019
- Sunius concurvatus Assing, 2017
- Sunius confluentus (Say, 1834)
- Sunius confusus (Coiffait, 1969)
- Sunius cordiformis Assing, 2002
- Sunius debilicornis (Wollaston, 1857)
- Sunius dimidiatus Wollaston, 1864
- Sunius fallax (Lokay, 1919)
- Sunius fenderi Hatch
- Sunius fernandezi Hernandez & Garcia, 1992
- Sunius ferrugineus (Bierig, 1934)
- Sunius filum Aubé, 1850
- Sunius fortespinosus Assing, 2006
- Sunius furcillatus Assing, 2002
- Sunius golgeliensis
- Sunius hellenicus (Coiffait, 1961)
- Sunius iranicus Assing, 2002
- Sunius italicus (Coiffait, 1961)
- Sunius kizilcadagicus
- Sunius lebedevi (Roubal, 1926)
- Sunius mallorcensis (Coiffait, 1969)
- Sunius melanocephalus (Fabricius, 1792)
- Sunius microphthalmus (H.Franz, 1979)
- Sunius monstrosus LeConte, 1863
- Sunius nevadensis (Coiffait, 1969)
- Sunius nitens (Duvivier, 1883)
- Sunius ovaliceps (Fauvel, 1878)
- Sunius ozgeni Anlaş, 2016
- Sunius palmi (H.Franz, 1979)
- Sunius peregrinus (Casey, 1905)
- Sunius plasoni Eppelsheim, 1875
- Sunius propinquus (Brisout, 1867)
- Sunius puglianus (Coiffait, 1961)
- Sunius quadripennis (Casey, 1905)
- Sunius reuteri Assing, 2017
- Sunius rufipes
- Sunius rugithorax Hatch, 1957
- Sunius seminiger (Fairmaire, 1860)
- Sunius sexpinosus Assing, 2006
- Sunius simoni (Quedenfeldt, 1881)
- Sunius tenerifensis (H.Franz, 1979)
- Sunius unicolor Mulsant & Rey, 1878
- Sunius valentianus (Coiffait, 1980)
- Sunius yagmuri
- Sunius yamani Anlaş, 2018
- † Sunius demersus von Heyden & von Heyden, 1866
