= Sunius debilicornis =

Scientific classification
- Kingdom: Animalia
- Phylum: Arthropoda
- Class: Insecta
- Order: Coleoptera
- Suborder: Polyphaga
- Infraorder: Staphyliniformia
- Family: Staphylinidae
- Genus: Sunius
- Species: S. debilicornis

Binomial name
- Sunius debilicornis (Wollaston, 1857)

Species of beetle

Sunius debilicornis is a species of rove beetle in the family Staphylinidae. However, several sources list under Hypomedon debilicornis
