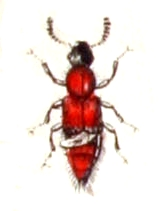

Scientific classification
- Kingdom: Animalia
- Phylum: Arthropoda
- Class: Insecta
- Order: Coleoptera
- Suborder: Polyphaga
- Infraorder: Staphyliniformia
- Family: Staphylinidae
- Genus: Lithocharis
- Species: L. ochracea

Binomial name
- Lithocharis ochracea Gravenhorst, 1802

= Lithocharis ochracea =

Species of beetle

Lithocharis ochracea is a species of rove beetle in the family Staphylinidae. It is found in Europe and North America.
