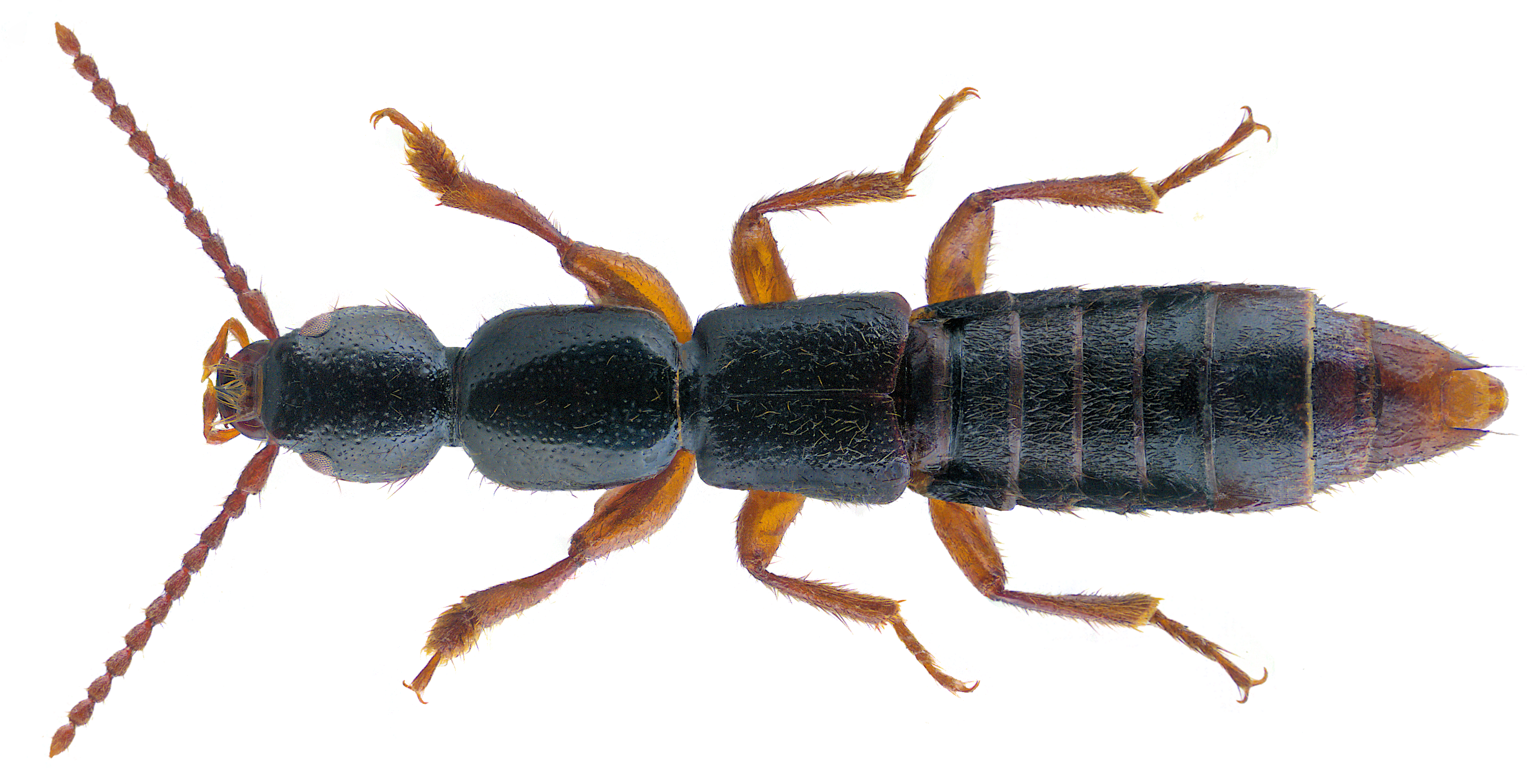
- Lathrobium brunnipes 8.7 mm (7.5 to 11.5 mm)

Scientific classification
- Kingdom: Animalia
- Phylum: Arthropoda
- Class: Insecta
- Order: Coleoptera
- Suborder: Polyphaga
- Infraorder: Staphyliniformia
- Family: Staphylinidae
- Genus: Lathrobium
- Species: L. brunnipes

Binomial name
- Lathrobium brunnipes (Fabricius, 1793)

= Lathrobium brunnipes =

Species of beetle

Lathrobium brunnipes is a species of rove beetles native to Europe.
