= Trisunius =

Scientific classification
- Kingdom: Animalia
- Phylum: Arthropoda
- Class: Insecta
- Order: Coleoptera
- Suborder: Polyphaga
- Infraorder: Staphyliniformia
- Family: Staphylinidae
- Subfamily: Paederinae
- Genus: Trisunius; Assing, 2011

Genus of beetles

Trisunius is a genus of rove beetles.
