= Cylindroxystina =

Scientific classification
- Kingdom: Animalia
- Phylum: Arthropoda
- Class: Insecta
- Order: Coleoptera
- Suborder: Polyphaga
- Infraorder: Staphyliniformia
- Family: Staphylinidae
- Subfamily: Paederinae
- Tribe: Lathrobiini
- Subtribe: Cylindroxystina; Bierig, 1943

Subtribe of beetles

Cylindroxystina is a subtribe of rove beetles within the family Staphylinidae.

== Genera ==
- Cylindroxystus Bierig, 1943
- Neolindus Scheerpeltz, 1933
