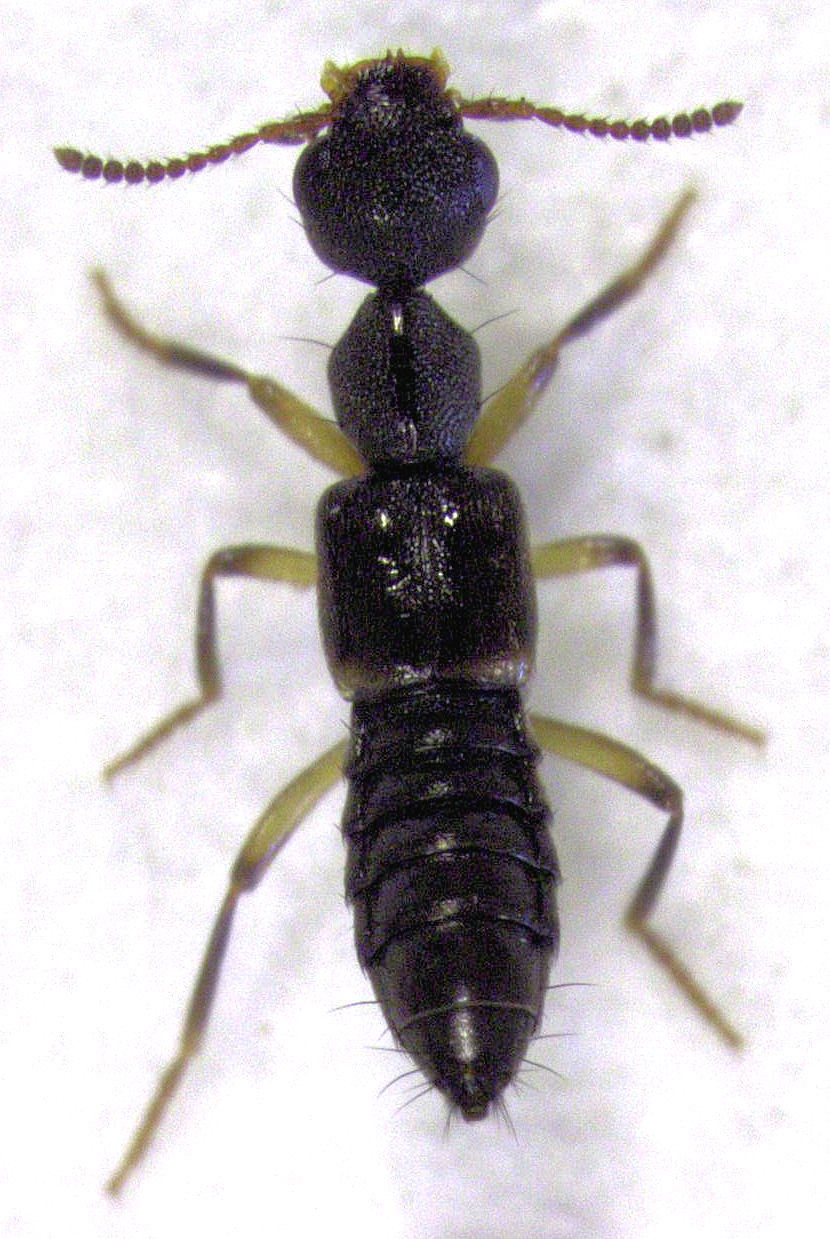
- Rugilus orbiculatus (Paykull, 1789)

Scientific classification
- Kingdom: Animalia
- Phylum: Arthropoda
- Class: Insecta
- Order: Coleoptera
- Suborder: Polyphaga
- Infraorder: Staphyliniformia
- Family: Staphylinidae
- Subfamily: Paederinae
- Tribe: Paederini
- Subtribe: Stilicina
- Genus: Rugilus; Samouelle, 1819

= Rugilus =

Genus of beetles

Rugilus is a genus of rove beetles. It is one of the major genera of the subfamily Paederinae.

== Species ==
Selection of species:

- Rugilus orbiculatus
- Rugilus rufipes
