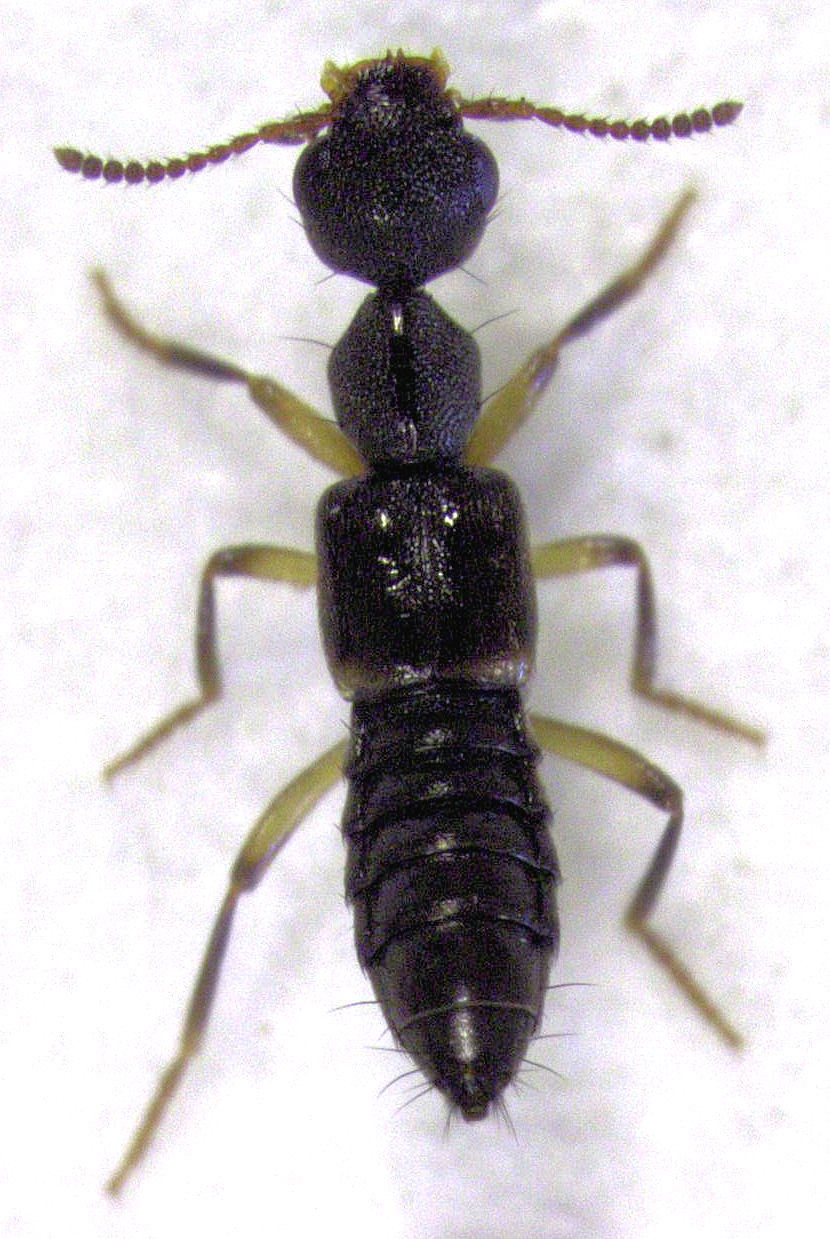

Scientific classification
- Kingdom: Animalia
- Phylum: Arthropoda
- Clade: Pancrustacea
- Class: Insecta
- Order: Coleoptera
- Suborder: Polyphaga
- Infraorder: Staphyliniformia
- Family: Staphylinidae
- Genus: Rugilus
- Species: R. orbiculatus

Binomial name
- Rugilus orbiculatus Paykull, 1789

= Rugilus orbiculatus =

Species of beetle

Rugilus orbiculatus is a species of rove beetle in the family Staphylinidae.
