= Stilicina =

Scientific classification
- Kingdom: Animalia
- Phylum: Arthropoda
- Class: Insecta
- Order: Coleoptera
- Suborder: Polyphaga
- Infraorder: Staphyliniformia
- Family: Staphylinidae
- Subfamily: Paederinae
- Tribe: Paederini
- Subtribe: Stilicina; Casey, 1905

Synonyms
- Rugilina Hatch, 1957

Subtribe of beetles

Stilicina is a subtribe of rove beetles within the family Staphylinidae.

== Genera ==
- Acrostilicus Hubbard, 1896
- Eustilicus Sharp, 1886
- Lathrorugilus Assing & Feldmann, 2001
- Megastilicus Casey, 1889
- Pachystilicus Casey, 1905
- Panscopaeus Sharp, 1889
- Rugilus Leach, 1819
- Stilicoderus Sharp, 1889
- Stiliderus Motschulsky, 1858
