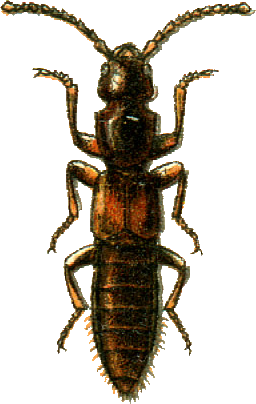

Scientific classification
- Kingdom: Animalia
- Phylum: Arthropoda
- Class: Insecta
- Order: Coleoptera
- Suborder: Polyphaga
- Infraorder: Staphyliniformia
- Family: Staphylinidae
- Genus: Achenium
- Species: A. humile

Binomial name
- Achenium humile (Nicolai, 1822)

= Achenium humile =

Species of beetle

Achenium humile is a species of beetle belonging to the family Staphylinidae.

It is native to Europe.
