= Cephalochetus =

Scientific classification
- Kingdom: Animalia
- Phylum: Arthropoda
- Class: Insecta
- Order: Coleoptera
- Suborder: Polyphaga
- Infraorder: Staphyliniformia
- Family: Staphylinidae
- Subfamily: Paederinae
- Genus: Cephalochetus (Kraatz, 1859)

Species
- Cephalochetus elegans; Cephalochetus formosae; Cephalochetus fusciceps (Cameron, 1931); Cephalochetus indicus (Kraatz, 1859); Cephalochetus myrmecocephalus (Lea, 1904); Cephalochetus rufus (Cameron, 1918)

Synonyms
- Calliderma (Motschulsky, 1858)

Genus of beetles

Cephalochetus is a genus of rove beetles in the subfamily Paederinae. Species are found in East Asia.
