= Eduard Eppelsheim =

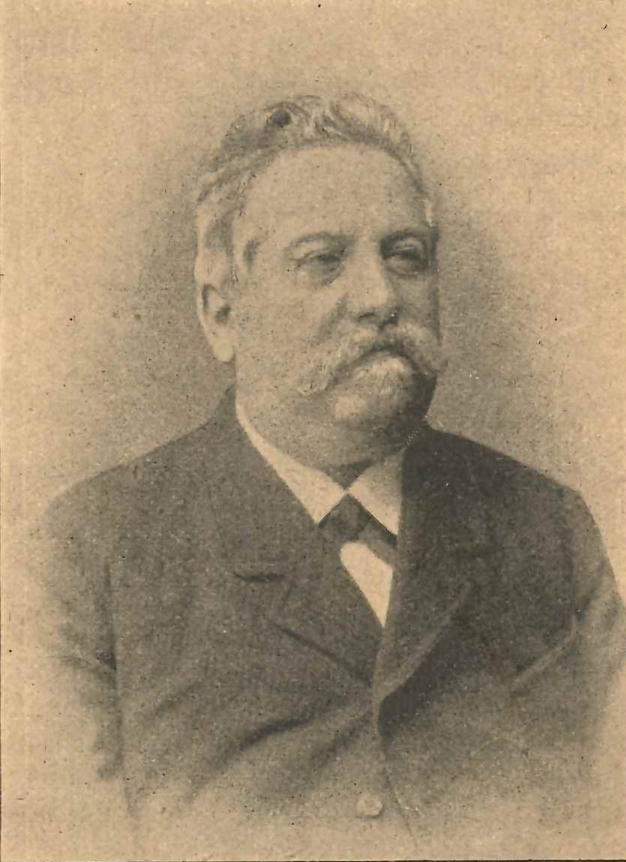

Eduard Eppelsheim (19 May 1837– 6 June 1896) was a Bavarian physician and coleopterologist who specialized in the Staphylinidae (rove beetles). His collection of nearly 54000 beetle specimens is held in the natural history museum at Vienna.

Eppelsheim was born in Dürkheim to landowner politician Eduard Eppelsheimer (1808–1866). He was educated at the Speyer Gymnasium before studying medicine at the Universities of Würzburg and Tübingen. With a medical degree in 1861 he practiced at Kandel, Dürkheim, Deidesheim and Wattenheim. During the Franco-Prussian War (1870–71) he served at a military hospital in Hildenbrandseck Castle, Gimmeldingen for which he received a Bavarian Military Merit Cross and other honours. From 1874 he practiced at Grünstadt where his brother Friedrich Eppelsheim (1834–1899) was a district judge. He became a royal district physician in Germersheim in 1886 and worked there until his death.

Along with his brother Friedrich, he had been interested in natural history from an early age and while his brother specialized in the lepidoptera, he took to the coleoptera. He described his findings in the Stettiner Entomologische Zeitung. Micropeplus eppelsheimi was named after him by Edmund Reitter in 1881. After his death, his beetle collection was purchased by the Natural History Museum at Vienna for 6000 Marks. Ludwig Ganglbauer named a species Niphetodes eppelsheimi after him in 1896.
