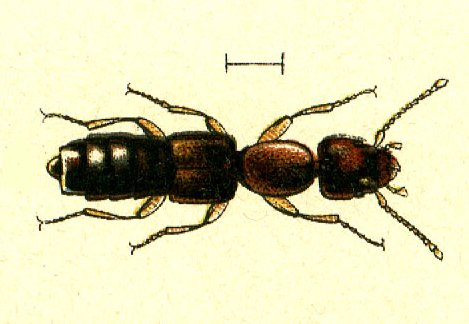
- Scopaeus rubidus

Scientific classification
- Kingdom: Animalia
- Phylum: Arthropoda
- Class: Insecta
- Order: Coleoptera
- Suborder: Polyphaga
- Infraorder: Staphyliniformia
- Family: Staphylinidae
- Genus: Scopaeus; Erichson, 1839

= Scopaeus =

Genus of beetles

Scopaeus is a genus of beetles belonging to the family Staphylinidae.

The genus has cosmopolitan distribution.

Species:

- Scopaeus abyssinicus Fagel, 1956
- Scopaeus admixtus Fagel, 1973
