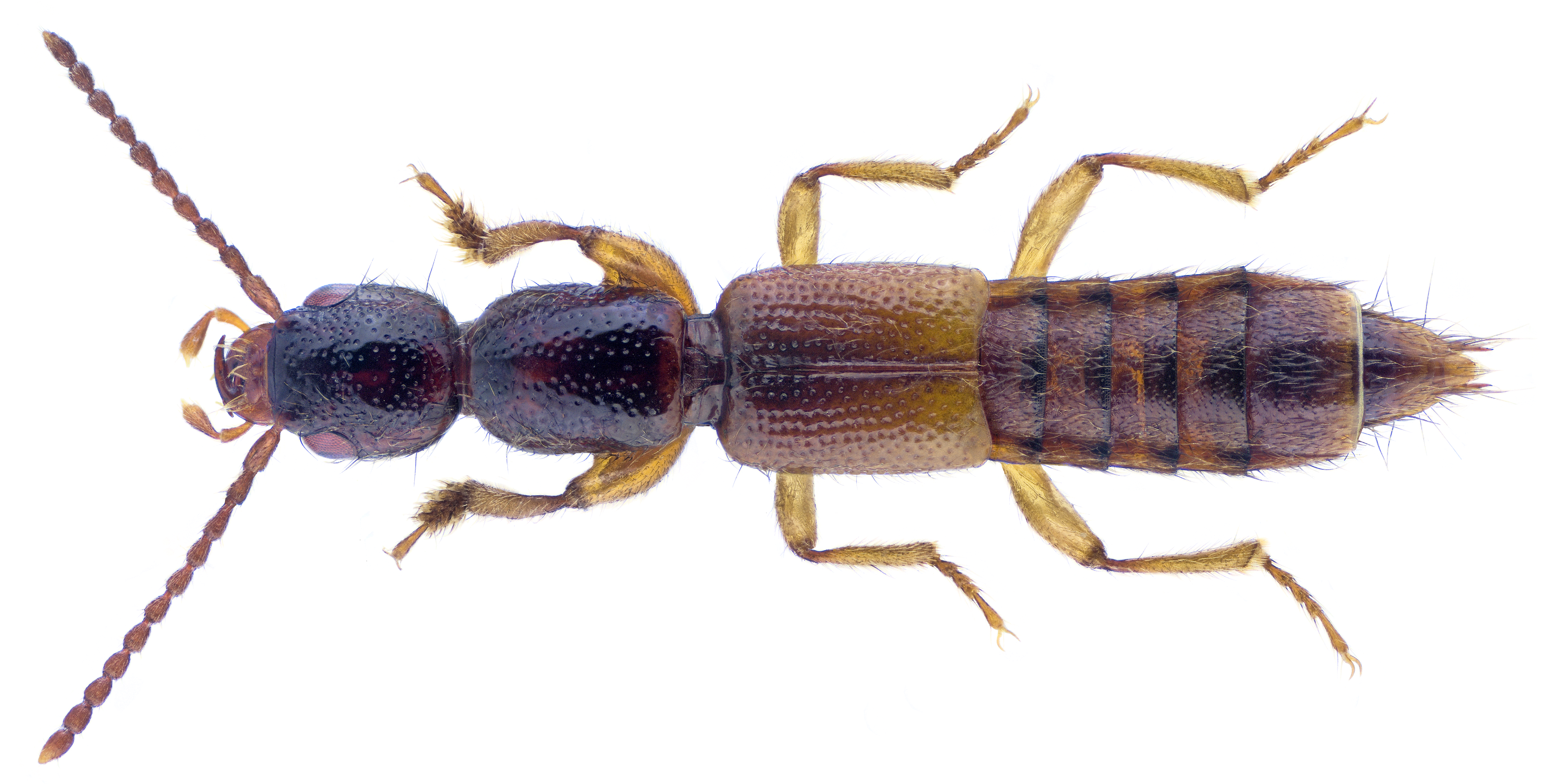
- Lobrathium

Scientific classification
- Domain: Eukaryota
- Kingdom: Animalia
- Phylum: Arthropoda
- Class: Insecta
- Order: Coleoptera
- Suborder: Polyphaga
- Infraorder: Staphyliniformia
- Family: Staphylinidae
- Genus: Lobrathium; Mulsant & Rey, 1878

= Lobrathium =

Genus of beetles

Lobrathium is a genus of beetles belonging to the family Staphylinidae.

The species of this genus are found in Europe, Japan and America.

Species:

- Lobrathium ablectum Assing, 2012
- Lobrathium abyssinum (Cameron, 1947)
