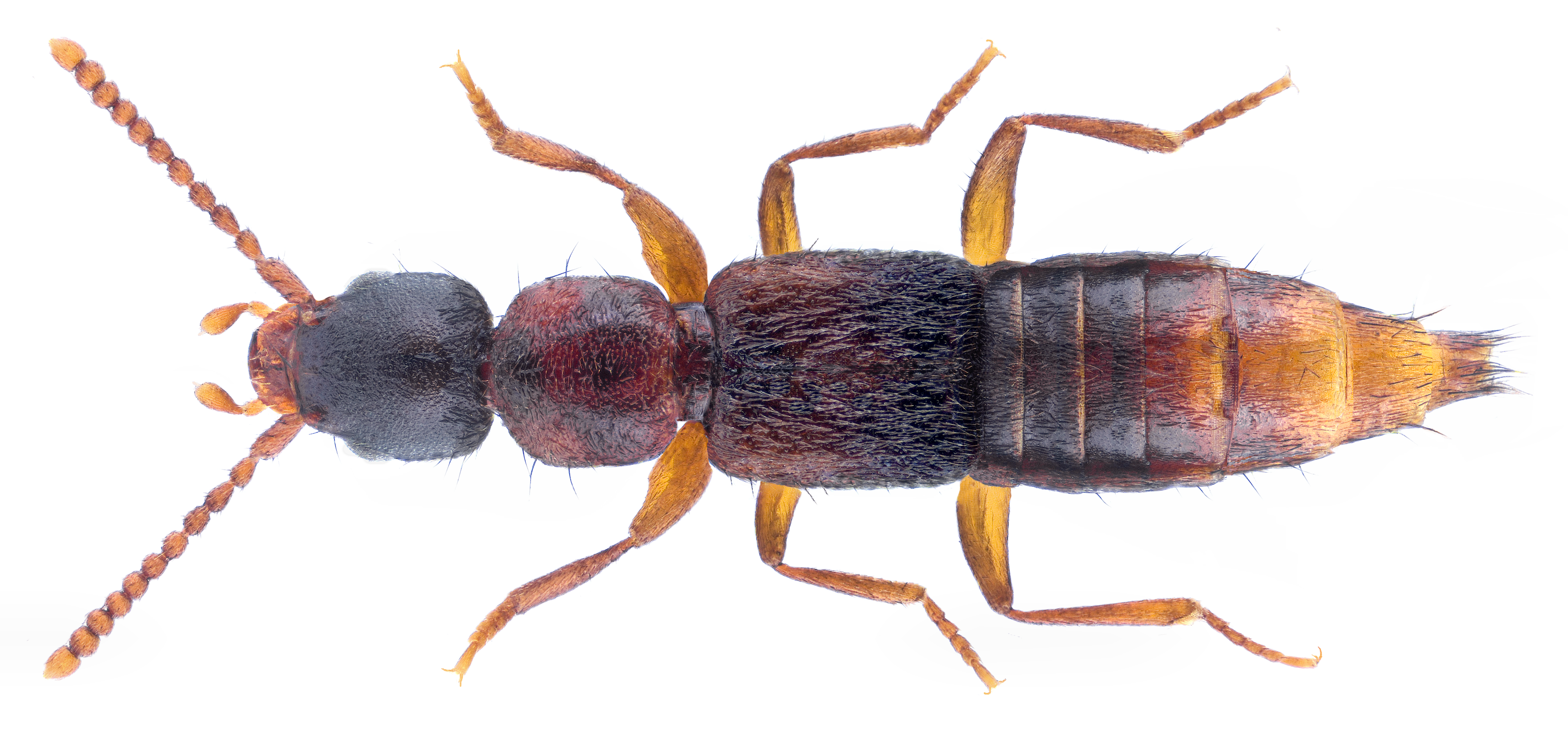
- Medon apicalis (Kraatz, 1857)

Scientific classification
- Kingdom: Animalia
- Phylum: Arthropoda
- Class: Insecta
- Order: Coleoptera
- Suborder: Polyphaga
- Infraorder: Staphyliniformia
- Family: Staphylinidae
- Subfamily: Paederinae
- Tribe: Lathrobiini
- Subtribe: Medonina; Casey, 1905

= Medonina =

Subtribe of beetles

Medonina is a subtribe of rove beetles within the family Staphylinidae. As of 2024, it contains 49 genera, including:

- Acanthoglossa Kraatz, 1859
- Achenomorphus Motschulsky, 1858
- Achenopsis Fauvel, 1900
