= Tetartopeus =

Scientific classification
- Domain: Eukaryota
- Kingdom: Animalia
- Phylum: Arthropoda
- Class: Insecta
- Order: Coleoptera
- Suborder: Polyphaga
- Infraorder: Staphyliniformia
- Family: Staphylinidae
- Genus: Tetartopeus; Czwalina, 1888

Genus of beetles

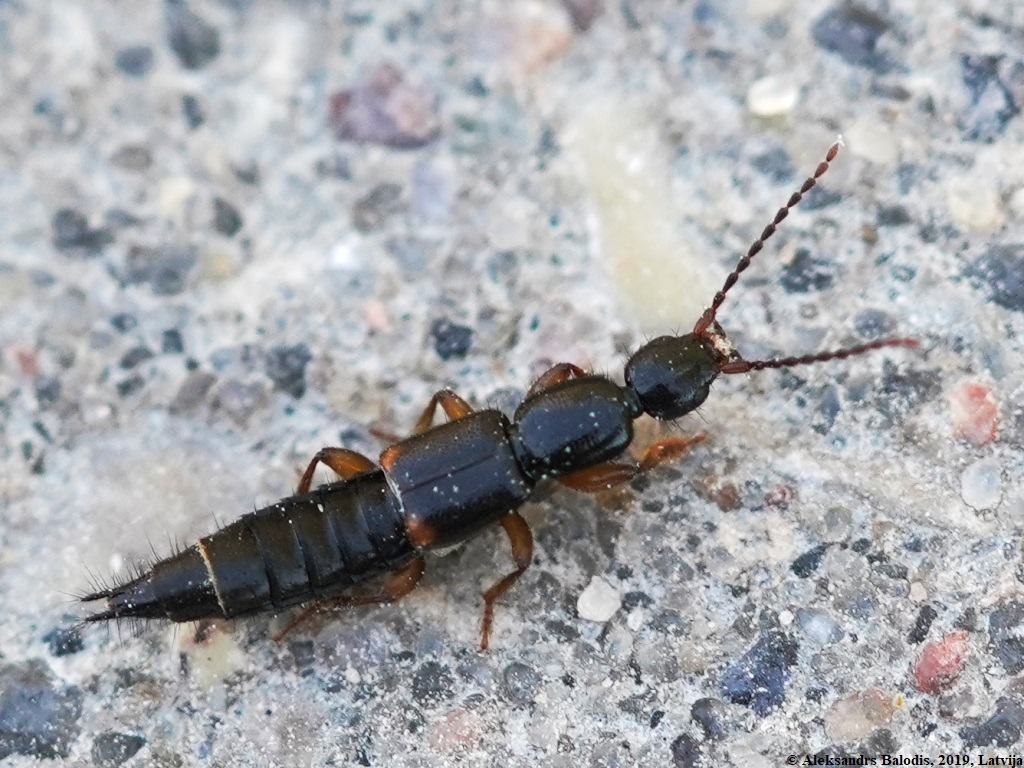
Tetartopeus terminatum

Tetartopeus is a genus of beetles belonging to the family Staphylinidae.

The species of this genus are found in Europe, Japan and North America.

Species:

- Tetartopeus adanensis Assing, 2004
- Tetartopeus albipes (Lucas & P.H., 1846)
- Tetartopeus ciceronii Zanetti, 1998 endemic to Italy
- Tetartopeus frischi Anlaş, 2015
