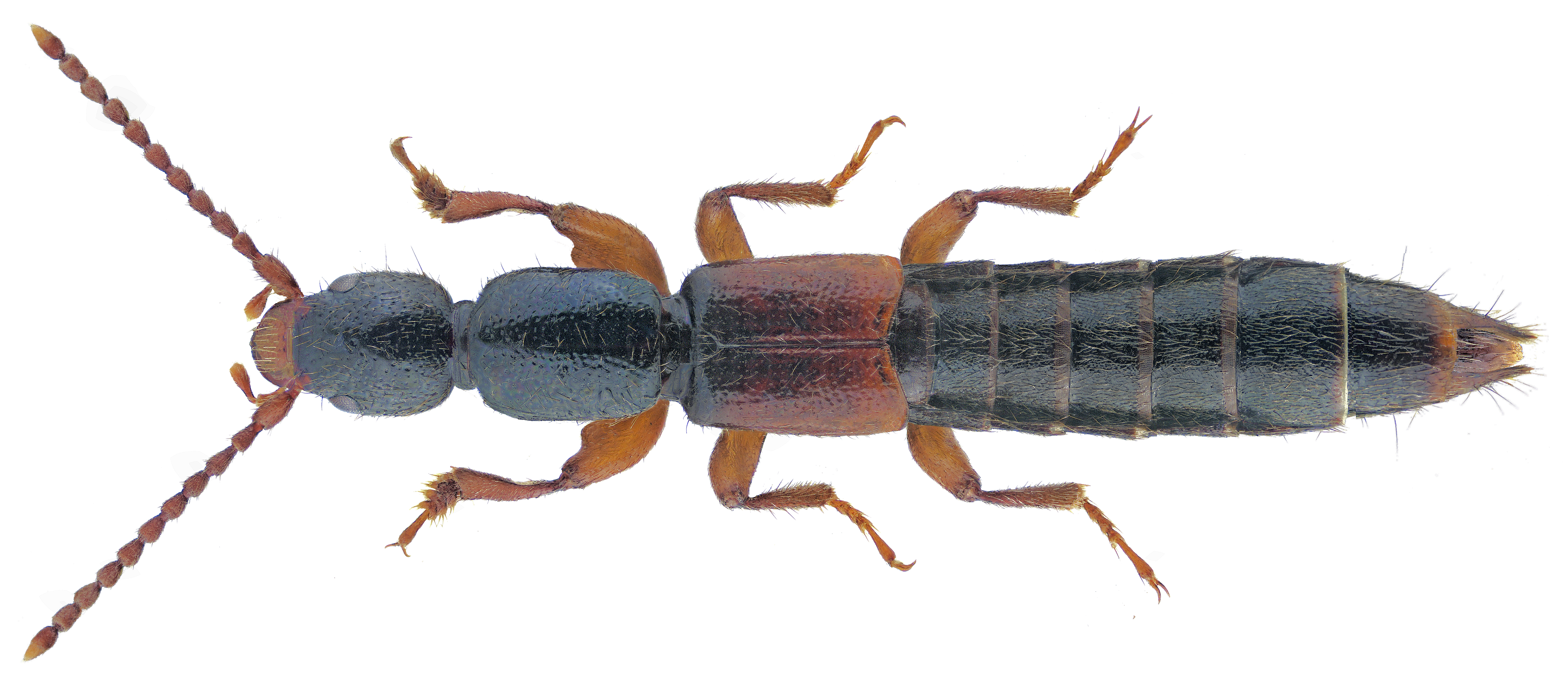
- Lathrobium fulvipenne (Gravenhorst, 1806)

Scientific classification
- Kingdom: Animalia
- Phylum: Arthropoda
- Clade: Pancrustacea
- Class: Insecta
- Order: Coleoptera
- Suborder: Polyphaga
- Infraorder: Staphyliniformia
- Family: Staphylinidae
- Subfamily: Paederinae
- Tribe: Lathrobiini; Laporte de Castelnau, 1835

= Lathrobiini =

Tribe of beetles

Lathrobiini is a tribe of rove beetles within the family Staphylinidae. As of 2024, it contains eight subtribes:

- Astenina Hatch, 1957
- Cylindroxystina Bierig, 1943
- Echiasterina Casey, 1905
- Lathrobiina Laporte de Castelnau, 1835
- Medonina Casey, 1905
- Scopaeina Mulsant & Rey, 1878
- Stilicina Casey, 1905
- Stilicopsina Casey, 1905
