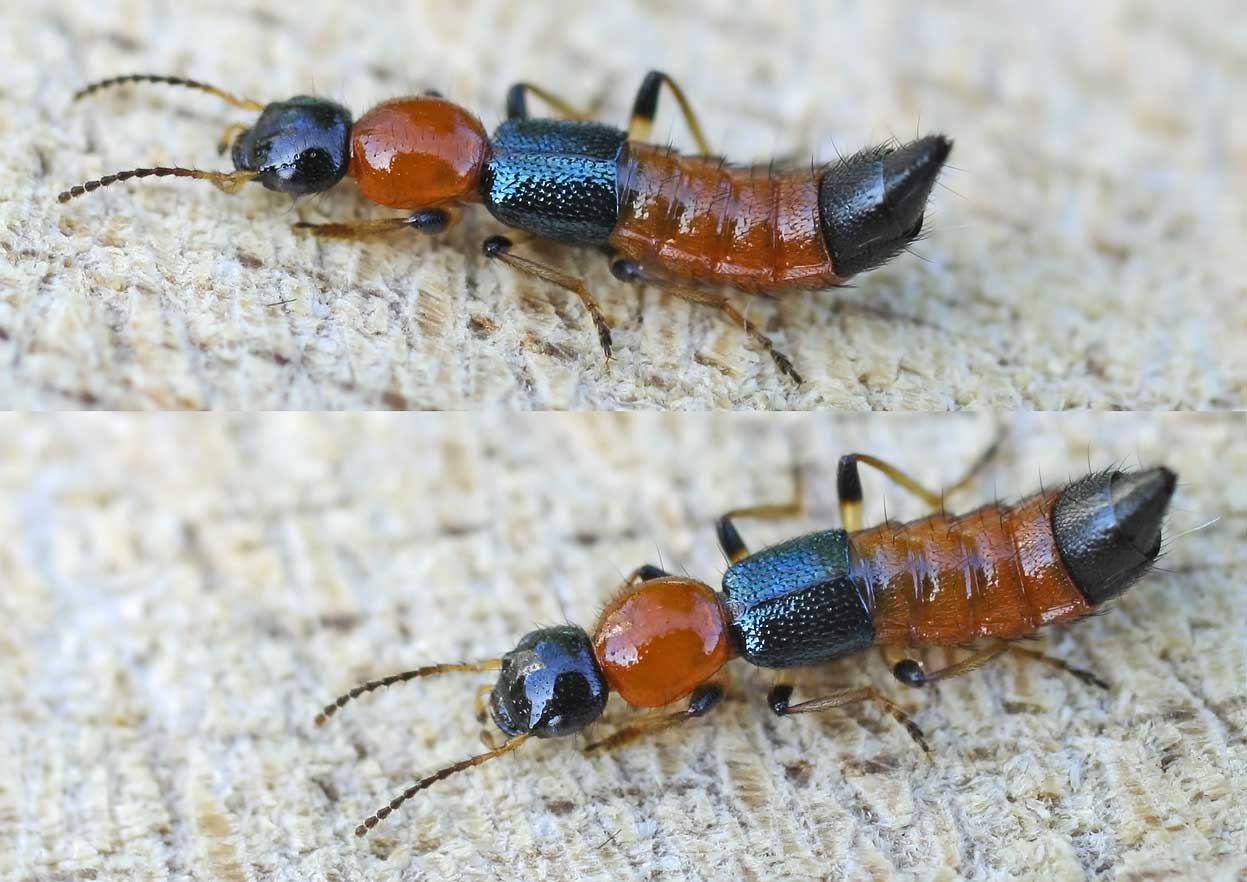
- Paederus littoralis

Scientific classification
- Kingdom: Animalia
- Phylum: Arthropoda
- Clade: Pancrustacea
- Class: Insecta
- Order: Coleoptera
- Suborder: Polyphaga
- Infraorder: Staphyliniformia
- Family: Staphylinidae; Lameere, 1900
- Subfamily: Paederinae; Fleming, 1821

= Paederinae =

Subfamily of beetles

The Paederinae are a subfamily of the Staphylinidae, rove beetles. As of 2024, three tribes are accepted within this subfamily: Lathrobiini, Paederini, and Pinophilini.

Three of the genera of a subtribe of the Paederini are associated with a skin irritation called Paederus dermatitis, due to a potent vesicant in their haemolymph. This irritant, pederin, is highly toxic, more potent than cobra venom; it has similar treatment to poisonings from spitting cobra venom. Thirty-six genera and 436 species are found in North America, generally in damp places, under logs, in caves and ant nests, in litter, or on foliage. Genera include Rugilus and Trisunius.

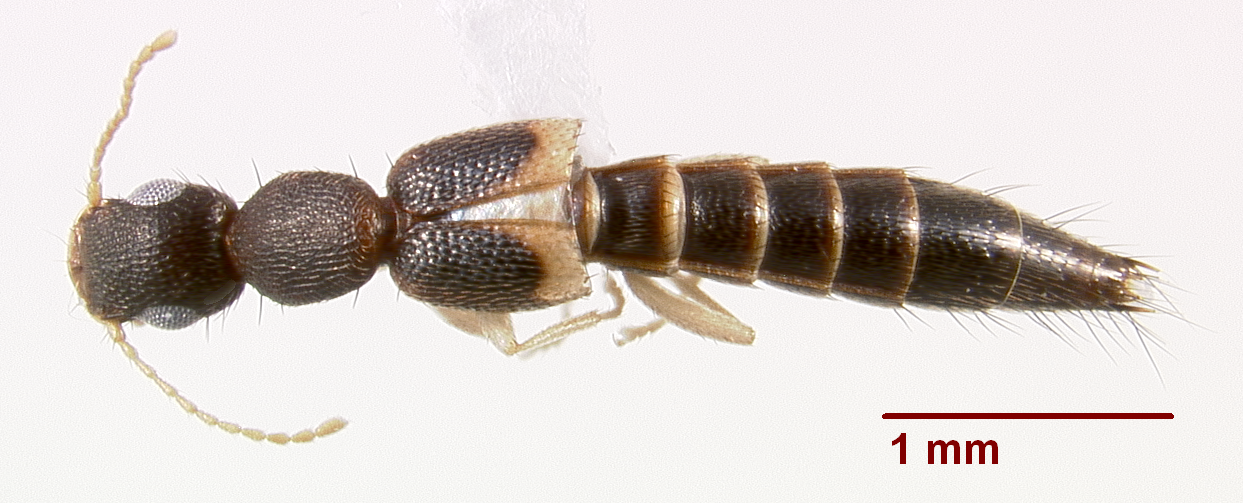
Astenus cinctus

Deroderus sp.

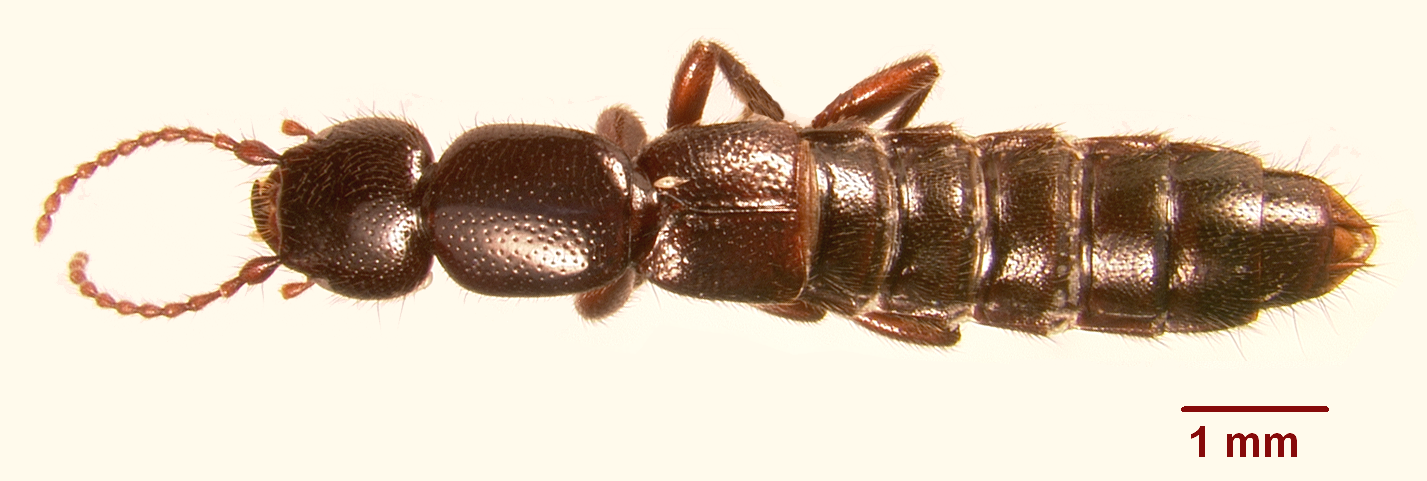
Lathroium sp.

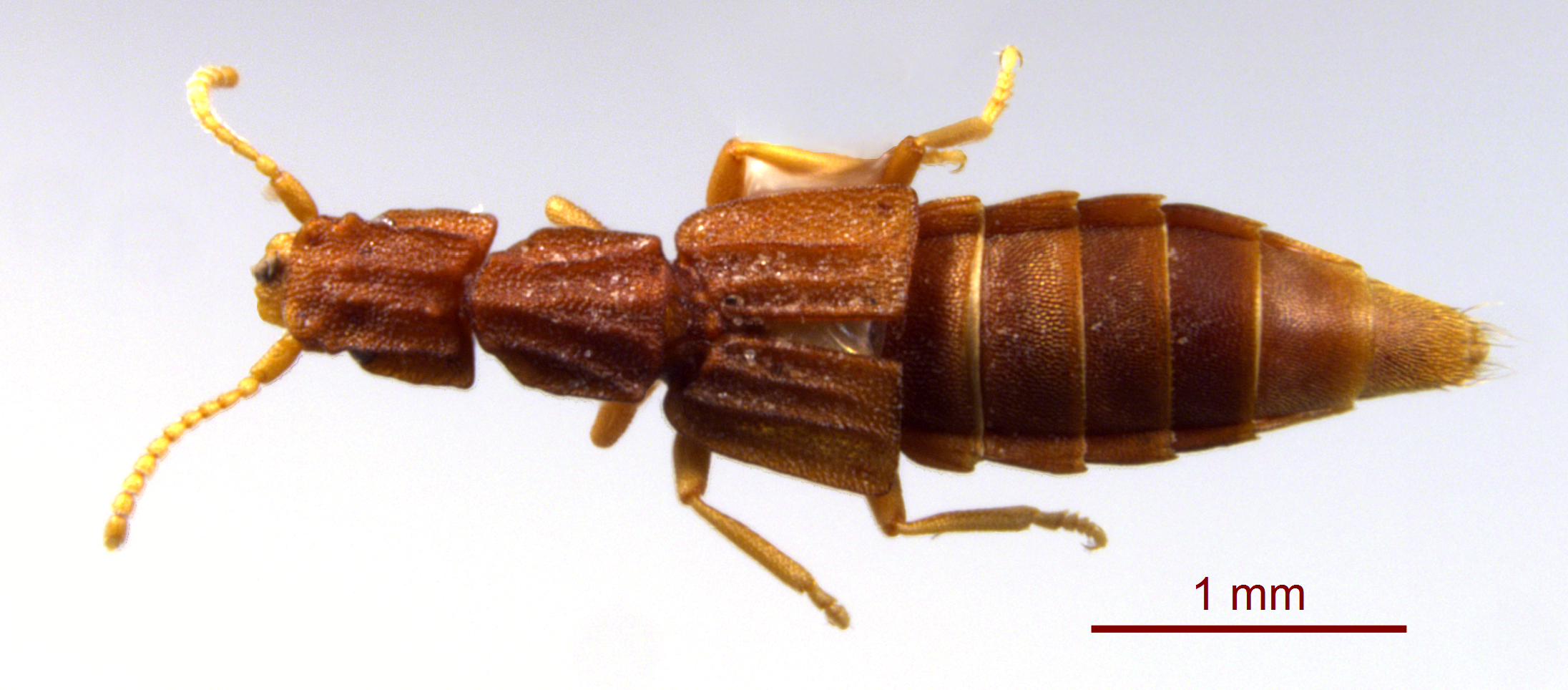
Myrmecosaurus ferrugineus

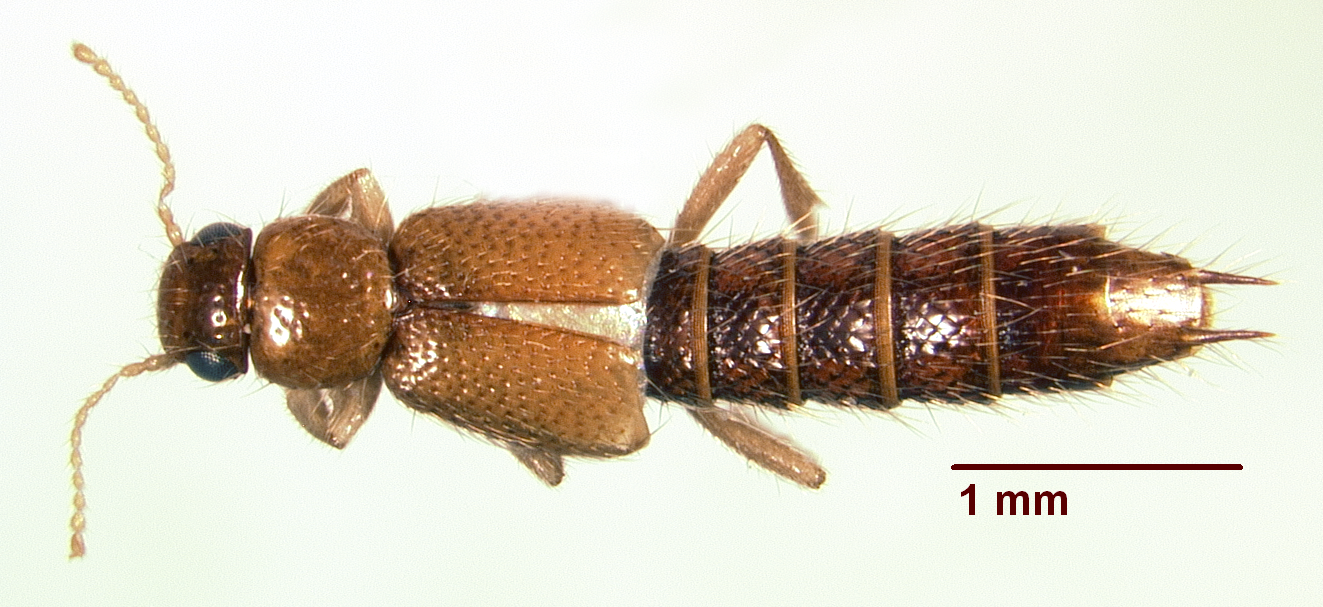
Palaminus sp.

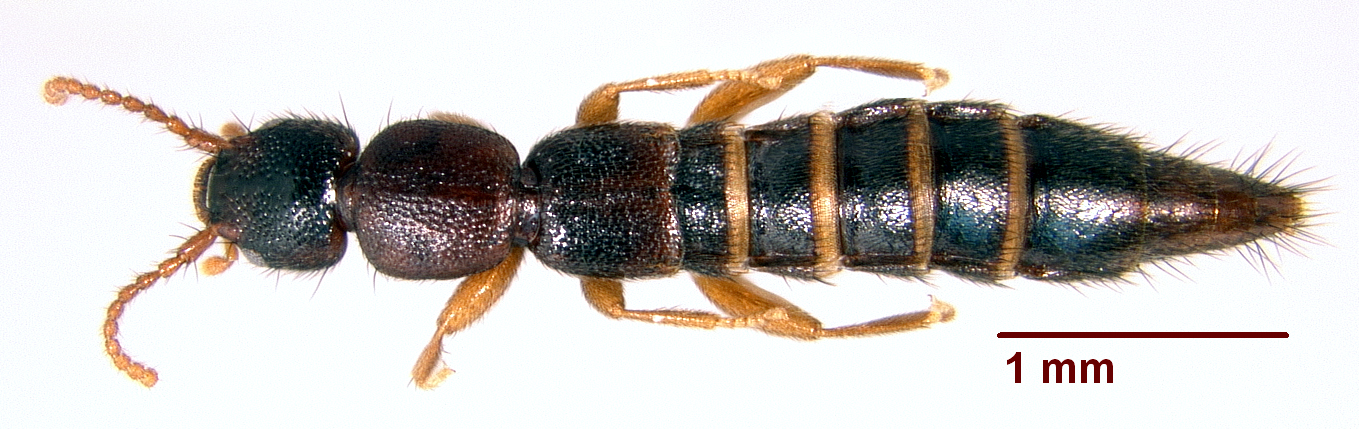
Sunius rufipes
