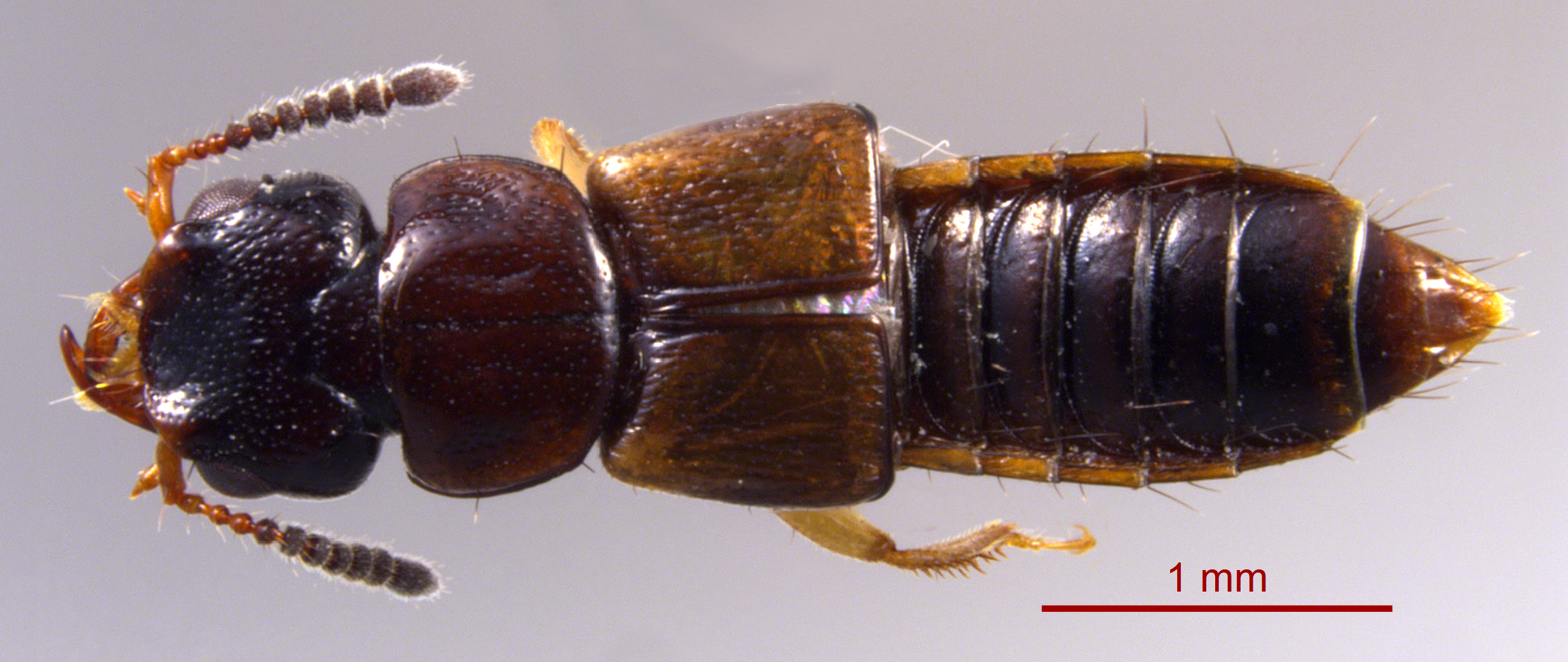
- Oxytelus sp.

Scientific classification
- Kingdom: Animalia
- Phylum: Arthropoda
- Clade: Pancrustacea
- Class: Insecta
- Order: Coleoptera
- Suborder: Polyphaga
- Infraorder: Staphyliniformia
- Family: Staphylinidae
- Subfamily: Oxytelinae; Fleming, 1821

Tribes
- Coprophilini; Euphaniini; Oxytelini; Thinobiini

= Oxytelinae =

Subfamily of beetles

The Oxytelinae are a subfamily of the Staphylinidae, rove beetles. There are about 20 genera and at least 320 described species in Oxytelinae.

== Genera ==
These 20 genera belong to the subfamily Oxytelinae:

- Anotylus Thomson, 1859^{i c g b}
- Aploderus Stephens, 1833^{i c g b}
- Apocellus Erichson, 1839^{i c g b}
- Bledius Leach, 1819^{i c g b}
- Carpelimus Leach, 1819^{i c g b}
- Coprophilus Latreille, 1829^{i c g b}
- Deleaster Erichson, 1839^{i c g b}
- Dolichoxenus Engel & Chatzimanolis, 2009
- Euphanias Fairmaire & Laboulbène, 1856^{g}
- Jerozenia Herman, 2003
- Manda Blackwelder, 1952^{i c g b}
- Mitosynum Campbell, 1982^{i c g b}
- Neoxus Herman, 1970^{i c g b}
- Ochthephilus Mulsant & Rey, 1856^{i c g b}
- Oxytelus Gravenhorst, 1802^{i c g b}
- Planeustomus Jacquelin du Val, 1857^{g}
- Platystethus Mannerheim, 1830^{i c g b}
- Syntomium Curtis, 1828^{i c g b}
- Teropalpus Solier, 1849^{i c g}
- Thinobius Kiesenwetter, 1844^{i c g b}
- Thinodromus Kraatz, 1857^{i c g b}
- Trogactus Sharp, 1887^{i c g}

Data sources: i = ITIS, c = Catalogue of Life, g = GBIF, b = Bugguide.net

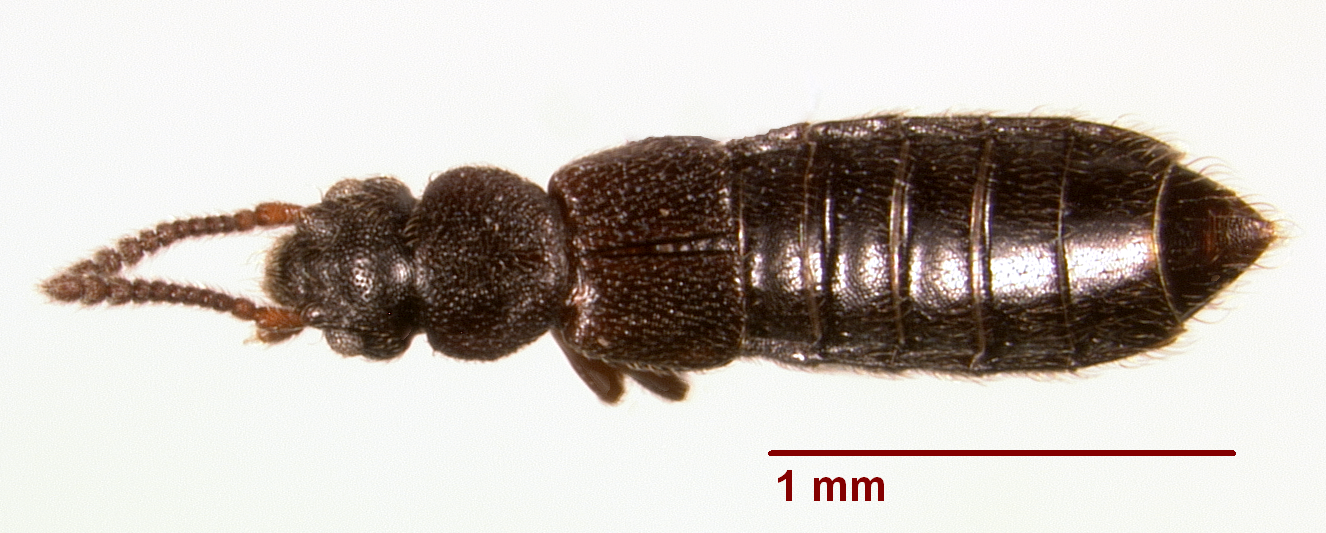
Carpelimus sp.

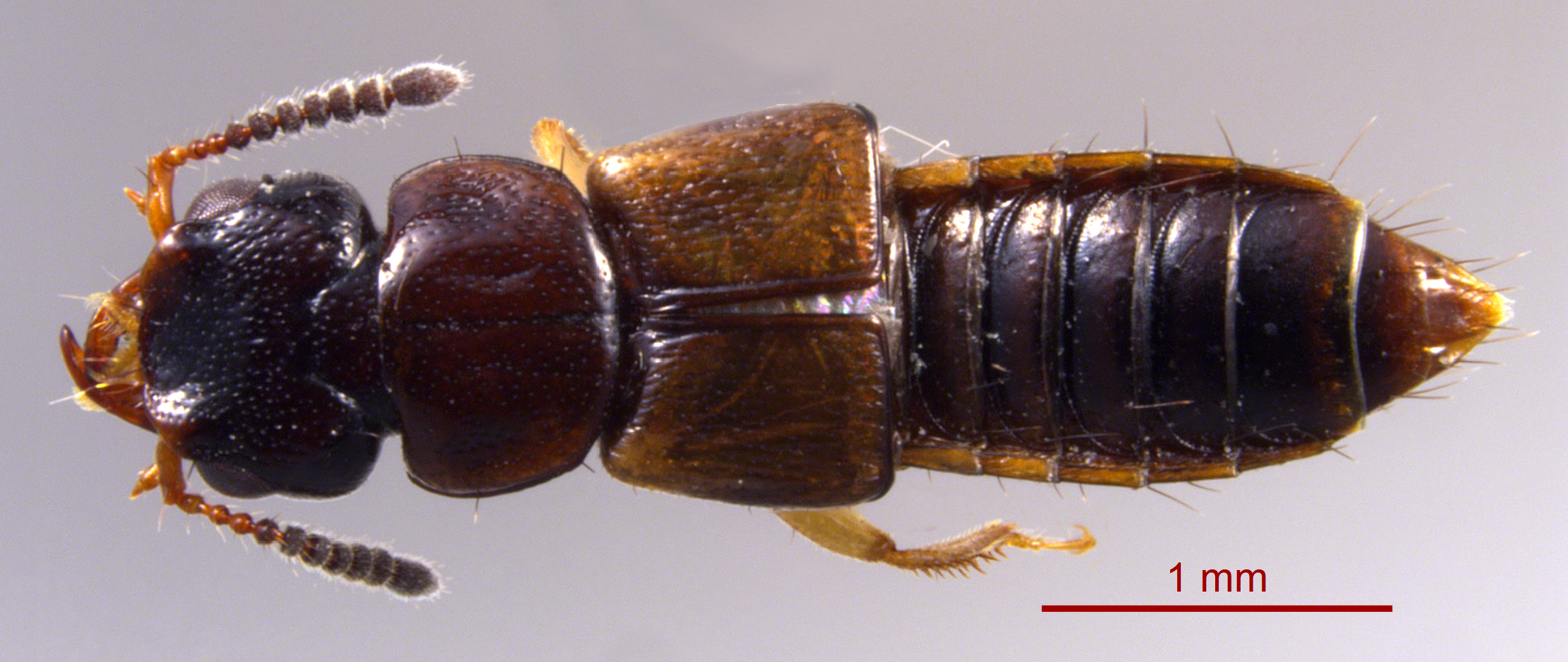
Oxytelus sp.

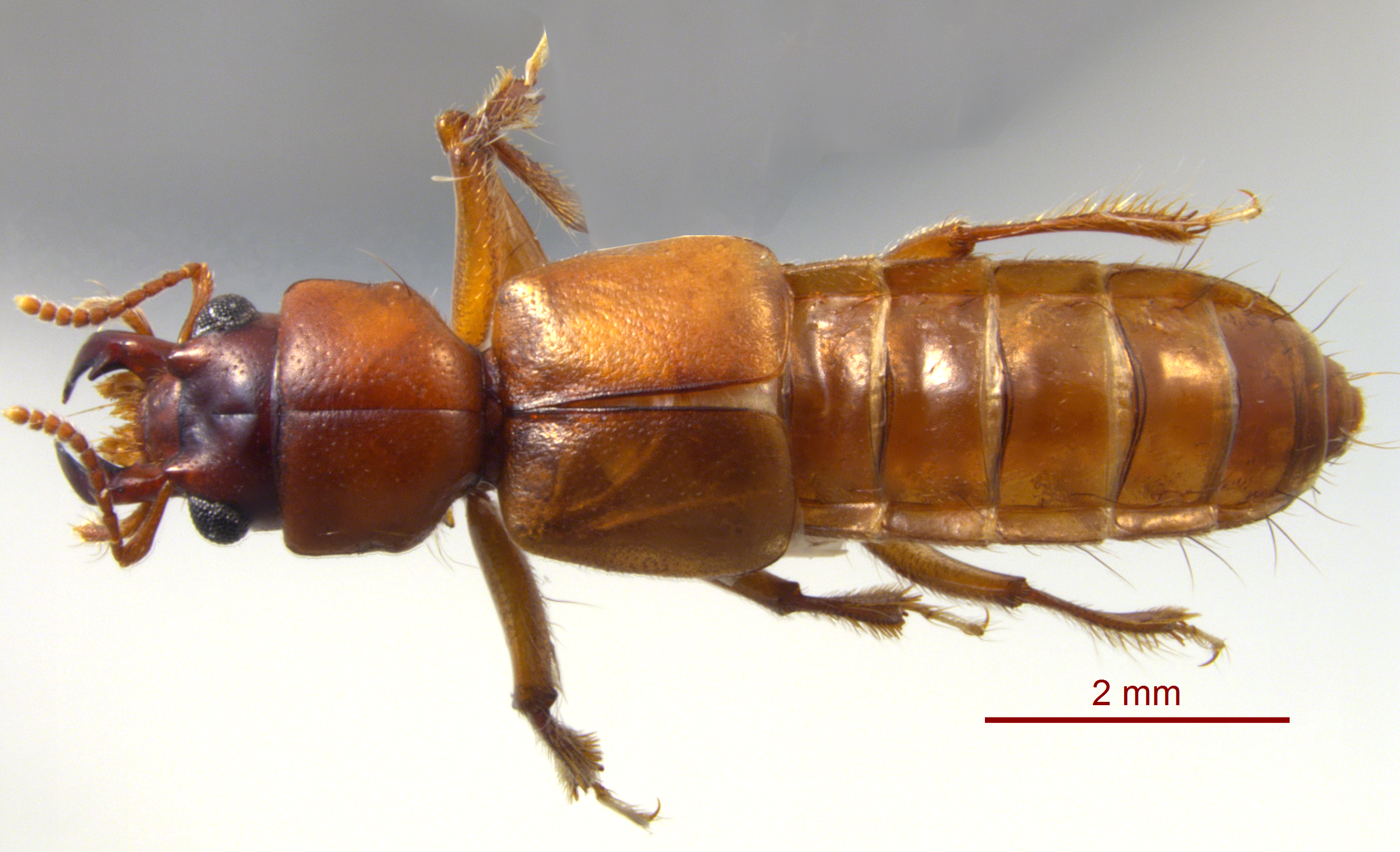
Bledius mandibularis

Anotylus cf. inustus

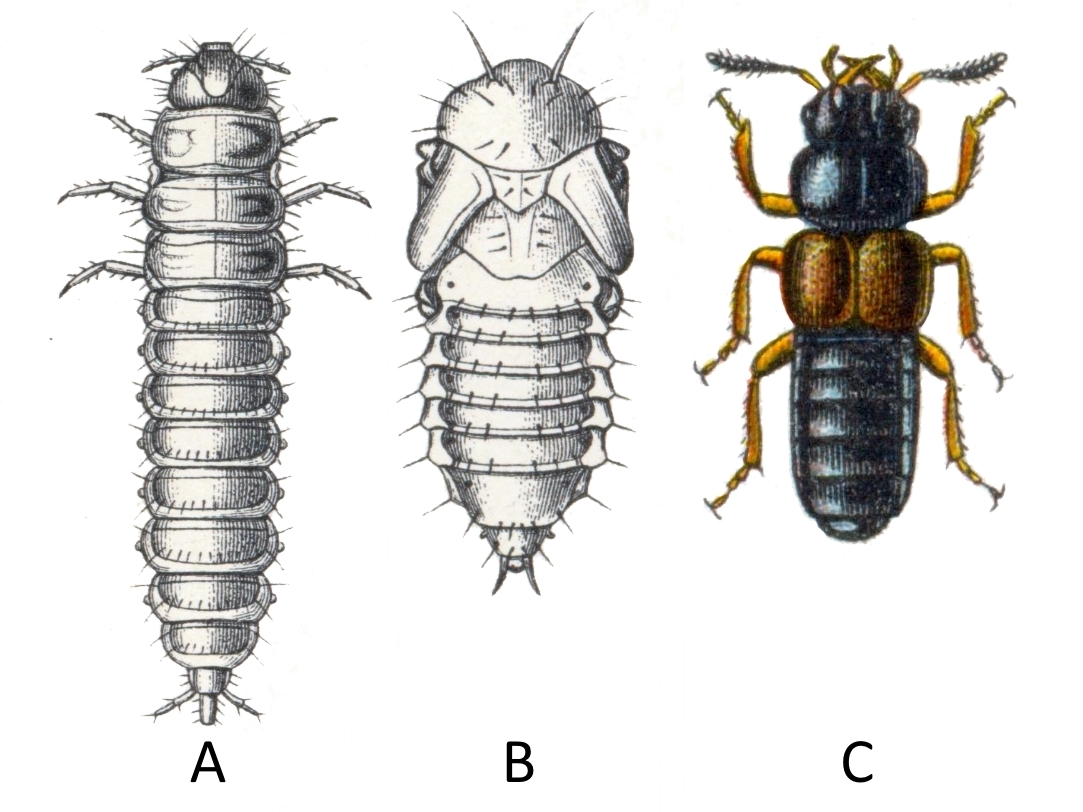
Platystethus arenarius
