= List of Carpelimus species =

This is a list of 105 species in the genus Carpelimus.

== Carpelimus species ==
- Carpelimus abdominalis (Sharp, 1880)
- Carpelimus aeolus Blackwelder, 1943
- Carpelimus aequalis Jacquelin du Val, 1857
- Carpelimus agonus (Casey, 1889)
- Carpelimus apacheanus (Casey, 1889)
- Carpelimus aridus Jacquelin du Val, 1857
- Carpelimus arizonae (Casey, 1889)
- Carpelimus armatus (Casey, 1889)
- Carpelimus basicornis (Notman, 1920)
- Carpelimus beattyi Blackwelder, 1943
- Carpelimus bilineatus Stephens, 1834
- Carpelimus bipuncticollis (Casey, 1889)
- Carpelimus blediinus (LeConte, 1877)
- Carpelimus bonnelli Hatch, 1957
- Carpelimus brachypterus (Coiffat, 1982)
- Carpelimus caseyi (Bernhauer, 1904)
- Carpelimus chapini Blackwelder, 1943
- Carpelimus confinis (Casey, 1889)
- Carpelimus conformis Blackwelder, 1943
- Carpelimus confusus (Casey, 1889)
- Carpelimus congener (Casey, 1889)
- Carpelimus conjunctus (Casey, 1889)
- Carpelimus convexulus (LeConte, 1877)
- Carpelimus correctus Blackwelder, 1943
- Carpelimus corticinus (Gravenhorst, 1806)
- Carpelimus cubensis Bierig, 1935
- Carpelimus danforthi Blackwelder, 1943
- Carpelimus darlingtoni Blackwelder, 1943
- Carpelimus debilis (Casey, 1889)
- Carpelimus decoloratus (Casey, 1889)
- Carpelimus delicatus (Casey, 1889)
- Carpelimus demmeli (Bierig, 1935)
- Carpelimus dentiger (Casey, 1889)
- Carpelimus detractus (Casey, 1889)
- Carpelimus difficilis (Casey, 1889)
- Carpelimus discipennis Bierig, 1935
- Carpelimus dissonus Bierig, 1935
- Carpelimus egregius (Casey, 1889)
- Carpelimus facetus (Casey, 1889)
- Carpelimus fenderi Hatch, 1957
- Carpelimus filum (Casey, 1889)
- Carpelimus fontinalis Sharp, 1880
- Carpelimus fuliginosus (Gravenhorst, 1802)
- Carpelimus fulvipes (Erichson, 1840)
- Carpelimus gilae (Casey, 1889)
- Carpelimus gracilis Mannerheim, 1830
- Carpelimus graphicus (Casey, 1889)
- Carpelimus haplomus Blackwelder, 1943
- Carpelimus harneyi Hatch, 1957
- Carpelimus imbellis (Casey, 1889)
- Carpelimus imitator Bierig, 1935
- Carpelimus impunctus Blackwelder, 1943
- Carpelimus incertus (Casey, 1889)
- Carpelimus ingens (Casey, 1889)
- Carpelimus inquisitus (Casey, 1889)
- Carpelimus insolitus (Casey, 1889)
- Carpelimus lacustris (Notman, 1924)
- Carpelimus languidus (Casey, 1889)
- Carpelimus lepidus (Casey, 1889)
- Carpelimus maculicollis (Notman, 1920)
- Carpelimus memnonius Erichson, 1840
- Carpelimus modestus (Casey, 1889)
- Carpelimus morio (Erichson, 1840)
- Carpelimus nanuloides Hatch, 1957
- Carpelimus nanulus (Casey, 1889)
- Carpelimus obesus (Kiesenwetter, 1844)
- Carpelimus obliquus (Casey, 1889)
- Carpelimus obsolescens Blackwelder, 1943
- Carpelimus occiduus (Casey, 1889)
- Carpelimus pacificus (Casey, 1889)
- Carpelimus pallidulus (Casey, 1889)
- Carpelimus pauperculus (Casey, 1889)
- Carpelimus pertenuis (Casey, 1889)
- Carpelimus petomus Blackwelder, 1943
- Carpelimus phaios Blackwelder, 1943
- Carpelimus phloeoporinus (LeConte, 1877)
- Carpelimus poseyensis (Blatchley, 1910)
- Carpelimus probus (Casey, 1889)
- Carpelimus prolixus Bierig, 1935
- Carpelimus prominens (Casey, 1889)
- Carpelimus providus (Casey, 1889)
- Carpelimus pudicus (Casey, 1889)
- Carpelimus pusillus (Gravenhorst, 1802)
- Carpelimus quadripunctatus (Say, 1831)
- Carpelimus rivularis (Motschulsky, 1860)
- Carpelimus robustulus (Casey, 1889)
- Carpelimus rulomus Blackwelder, 1943
- Carpelimus salicola (Casey, 1895)
- Carpelimus salinus Moore, 1964
- Carpelimus scrobiger (Cameron, 1923)
- Carpelimus scrupulus (Casey, 1889)
- Carpelimus sculptilis (Casey, 1889)
- Carpelimus sericeus (Cameron, 1923)
- Carpelimus simplarius (LeConte, 1877)
- Carpelimus sordidus Cameron, 1923
- Carpelimus subtilior (Cameron, 1923)
- Carpelimus subtilis (Erichson, 1839)
- Carpelimus temporalis (Casey, 1889)
- Carpelimus testaceipennis Cameron, 1923
- Carpelimus uniformis (LeConte, 1877)
- Carpelimus vancouverensis Hatch, 1957
- Carpelimus varicornis (Bernhauer, 1904)
- Carpelimus vespertinus (Notman, 1920)
- Carpelimus volans (Notman, 1920)
- Carpelimus weissi (Notman, 1924)
