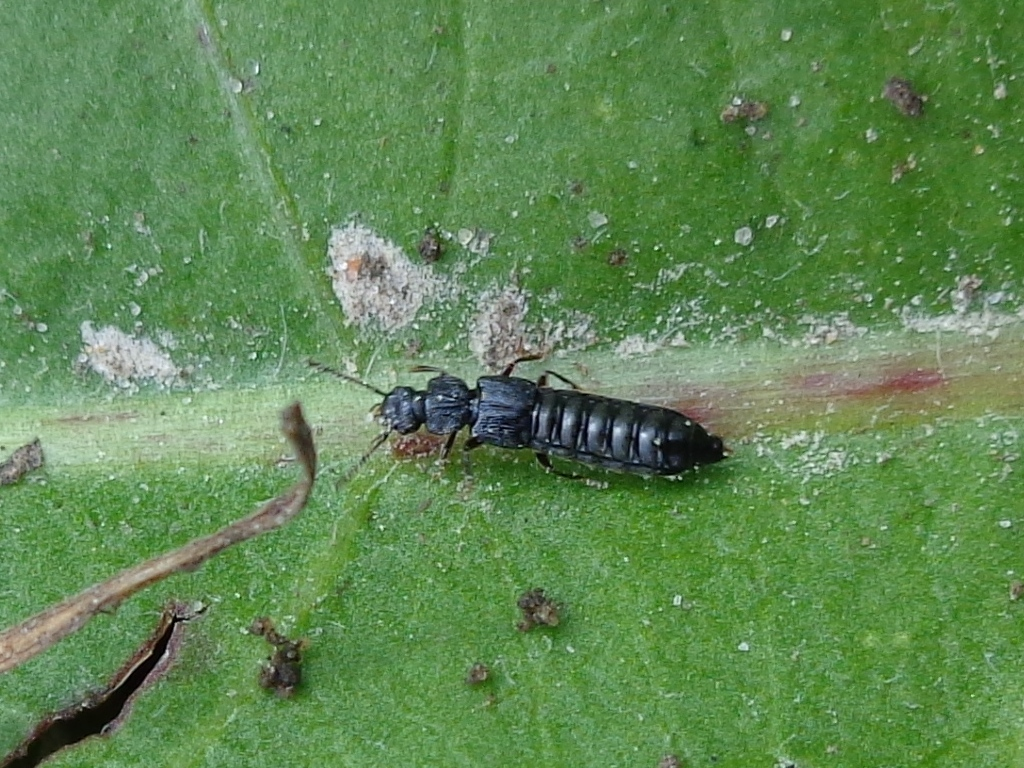
- Anotylus rugosus

Scientific classification
- Kingdom: Animalia
- Phylum: Arthropoda
- Clade: Pancrustacea
- Class: Insecta
- Order: Coleoptera
- Suborder: Polyphaga
- Infraorder: Staphyliniformia
- Family: Staphylinidae
- Subfamily: Oxytelinae
- Tribe: Oxytelini

= Oxytelini =

Tribe of beetles

Oxytelini is a tribe of spiny-legged rove beetles in the family Staphylinidae. There are about 11 genera and at least 20 described species in Oxytelini.

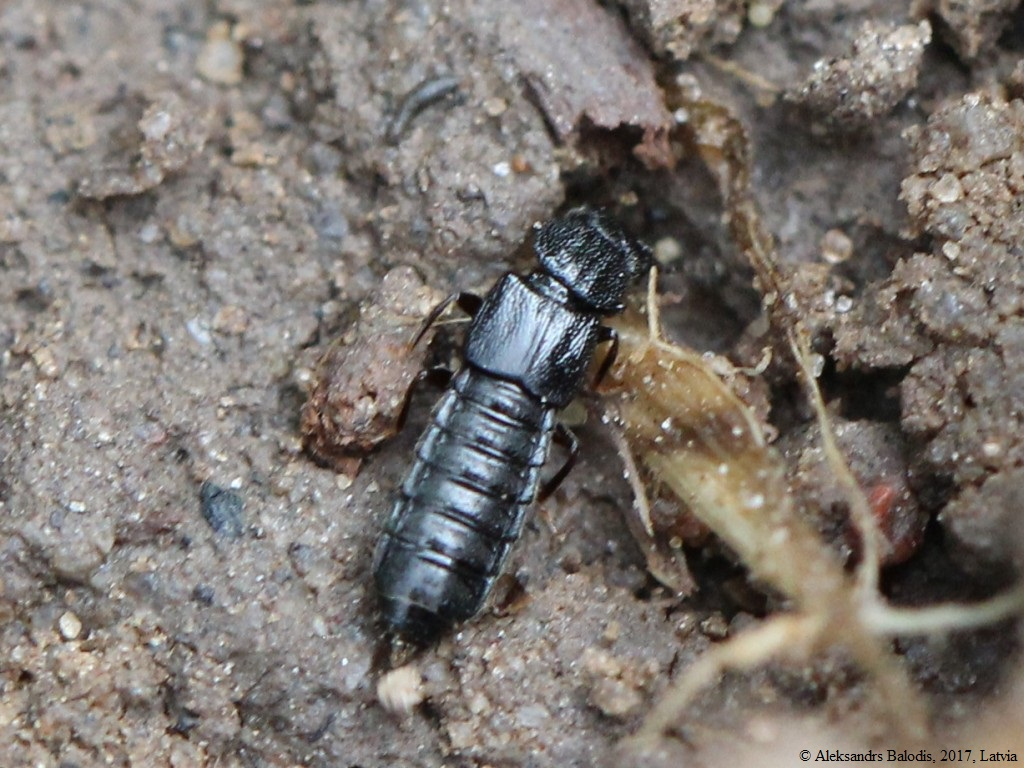
Oxytelus

== Genera ==
These 11 genera belong to the tribe Oxytelini:

- Anotylus Thomson, 1859^{i c g b}
- Aploderus Stephens, 1833^{i c g b}
- Apocellus Erichson, 1839^{i c g b}
- Carpelimus Leach, 1819^{i c g b}
- Manda Blackwelder, 1952^{i c g b}
- Neoxus Herman, 1970^{i c g b}
- Ochthephilus Mulsant & Rey, 1856^{i c g b}
- Oxytelus Gravenhorst, 1802^{i c g b}
- Platystethus Mannerheim, 1830^{i c g b}
- Thinobius Kiesenwetter, 1844^{i c g b}
- Thinodromus Kraatz, 1857^{i c g b}

Data sources: i = ITIS, c = Catalogue of Life, g = GBIF, b = Bugguide.net
