= Euphaniini =

Scientific classification
- Kingdom: Animalia
- Phylum: Arthropoda
- Class: Insecta
- Order: Coleoptera
- Suborder: Polyphaga
- Infraorder: Staphyliniformia
- Family: Staphylinidae
- Subfamily: Oxytelinae
- Tribe: Euphaniini; Reitter, 1909

Tribe of beetles

Euphaniini is a tribe of spiny-legged rove beetles in the family Staphylinidae. There are at least 8 genera in Euphaniini.

== Genera ==
These genera belong to the tribe Euphaniini:

- Deleaster Erichson, 1839
- Euphanias Fairmaire & Laboulbène, 1856
- Mitosynum Campbell, 1982;
- Oxypius Newton, 1982
- Platydeleaster Schülke, 2003
- Syntomium Curtis, 1828
- † Protodeleaster Cai et al. 2013 (rove beetle)
- † Pseudanotylus Cai & Huang 2013 (rove beetle)
