= Carpelimus aridus =

Scientific classification
- Domain: Eukaryota
- Kingdom: Animalia
- Phylum: Arthropoda
- Class: Insecta
- Order: Coleoptera
- Suborder: Polyphaga
- Infraorder: Staphyliniformia
- Family: Staphylinidae
- Genus: Carpelimus
- Species: C. aridus

Binomial name
- Carpelimus aridus Jacquelin du Val, 1857

Species of beetle

Carpelimus aridus is a species in the subfamily Oxytelinae ("spiny-legged rove beetles"), in the suborder Polyphaga ("water, rove, scarab, long-horned, leaf and snout beetles"). It is found in the Caribbean.
