= Oxytelus lividus =

Scientific classification
- Kingdom: Animalia
- Phylum: Arthropoda
- Class: Insecta
- Order: Coleoptera
- Suborder: Polyphaga
- Infraorder: Staphyliniformia
- Family: Staphylinidae
- Genus: Oxytelus
- Species: O. lividus

Binomial name
- Oxytelus lividus Motschulsky, 1857

Species of beetle

Oxytelus lividus is a species of rove beetle widely spread in Asia. It is found in China, Sri Lanka, India, Myanmar, Malaysia, Thailand, Vietnam, Indonesia, and Laos.
