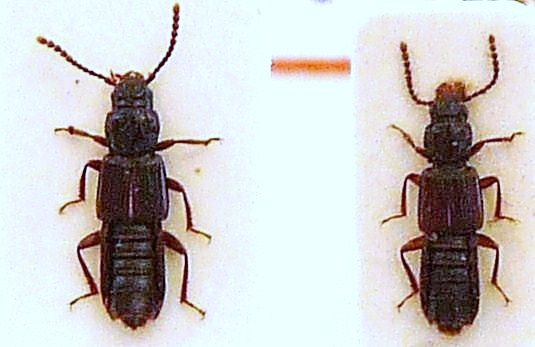
- Coprophilus striatulus

Scientific classification
- Kingdom: Animalia
- Phylum: Arthropoda
- Class: Insecta
- Order: Coleoptera
- Suborder: Polyphaga
- Infraorder: Staphyliniformia
- Family: Staphylinidae
- Subfamily: Oxytelinae
- Tribe: Coprophilini
- Genus: Coprophilus; Latreille, 1829

Species
- Coprophilus castoris; Coprophilus formosanus; Coprophilus sexualis; Coprophilus striatulus

= Coprophilus =

Genus of beetles

Coprophilus (from Greek 'dung-loving') is, with about 30 species, a genus of staphylinid beetles. They are confined to temperate regions of the Northern Hemisphere. They are generally found in rotting plants and woods, compost, under leaf litter, and near herbivore dung, hence their generic name.
