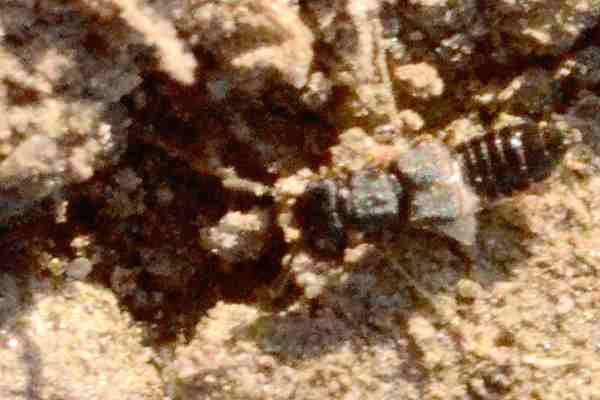
- A. tetracarinatus from Commanster, Belgium

Scientific classification
- Domain: Eukaryota
- Kingdom: Animalia
- Phylum: Arthropoda
- Class: Insecta
- Order: Coleoptera
- Suborder: Polyphaga
- Infraorder: Staphyliniformia
- Family: Staphylinidae
- Genus: Anotylus
- Species: A. tetracarinatus

Binomial name
- Anotylus tetracarinatus (Block, 1799)

Synonyms
- Staphylinus tetracarinatus Block, 1799; Oxytelus tetracarinatus

= Anotylus tetracarinatus =

Species of beetle

Anotylus tetracarinatus is a small rove beetle with a wide distribution. It is the most common species of the genus, and maybe even of the family, in the whole of Central Europe.

The beetles can cause severe pain if they come into contact with the human eye. This pain usually lasts for about ten minutes.

== Description ==
Anotylus tetracarinatus reaches a length of 1.7 to 2.1 mm. The body is dark. The tibiae of the front legs are not sinuated at the tip. The abdomen of the males do not possess any protuberances.

The species develops in a variety of decaying materials. Often the imagines swarm in spring or early summer in great numbers, especially in the afternoons or evenings of warm days.

== Distribution ==
Anotylus tetracarinatus was first described from Plauischer Grund near Dresden, but is found natively in Algeria, Europe, Russia, Turkey, Iran, United States and Canada.

== See also ==
- Paederus dermatitis, a related beetle that can cause dermatitis
