= Anotylus insignitus =

Scientific classification
- Domain: Eukaryota
- Kingdom: Animalia
- Phylum: Arthropoda
- Class: Insecta
- Order: Coleoptera
- Suborder: Polyphaga
- Infraorder: Staphyliniformia
- Family: Staphylinidae
- Genus: Anotylus
- Species: A. insignitus

Binomial name
- Anotylus insignitus (Gravenhorst, 1806)

Species of beetle

Anotylus insignitus is a species of spiny-legged rove beetle in the family Staphylinidae. It is found in Africa, the Caribbean, Central America, North America, Oceania, South America, and Europe.
