= Anotylus latiusculus =

Scientific classification
- Kingdom: Animalia
- Phylum: Arthropoda
- Class: Insecta
- Order: Coleoptera
- Suborder: Polyphaga
- Infraorder: Staphyliniformia
- Family: Staphylinidae
- Genus: Anotylus
- Species: A. latiusculus

Binomial name
- Anotylus latiusculus (Kraatz, 1859)

Synonyms
- Oxytelus latiusculus Kraatz, 1859; Oxytelus m-elevatus Lea, 1906; Oxytelus sulcifrons Fauvel, 1875; Oxytelus ganglbaueri Bernhauer, 1907; Oxytelus boehmi Bernhauer, 1910; Oxytelus pusillus Boheman, 1848

Species of beetle

Anotylus latiusculus is a species of rove beetle widely spread in Asia.

== Description ==
It has a length of 1.5 mm.

It is a parasitoid of Musca domestica that attack the puparium.

Two subspecies were identified.

- Anotylus latiusculus latiusculus - nominate
- Anotylus latiusculus niticeps (Bernhauer, 1935)
