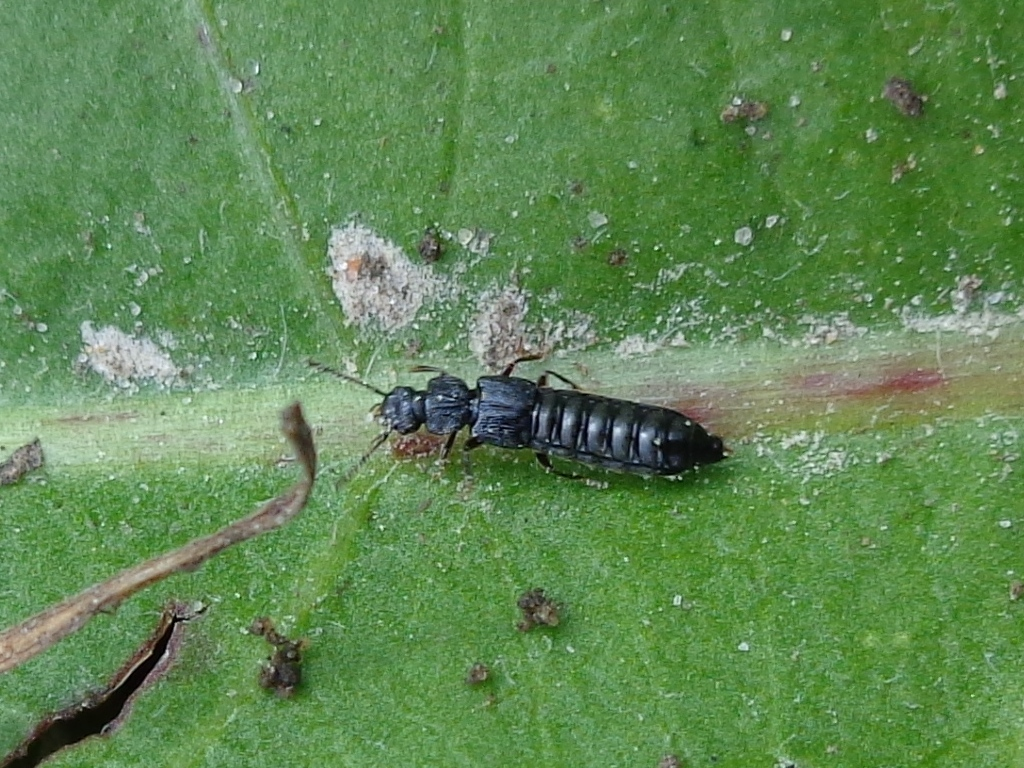

Scientific classification
- Domain: Eukaryota
- Kingdom: Animalia
- Phylum: Arthropoda
- Class: Insecta
- Order: Coleoptera
- Suborder: Polyphaga
- Infraorder: Staphyliniformia
- Family: Staphylinidae
- Genus: Anotylus
- Species: A. rugosus

Binomial name
- Anotylus rugosus (Fabricius, 1775)

= Anotylus rugosus =

Species of beetle

Anotylus rugosus is a species of spiny-legged rove beetle in the family Staphylinidae. It is found in Africa, Australia, Europe and Northern Asia (excluding China), and North America. They are common in wetland marginal situations, such as among reed litter, at carrion, among debris under bark, or in mammal and bird nests. They also occur among foliage or under debris in salt marshes and have been found under decaying seaweed on the strandline. They fly in warm weather, usually in the afternoon or evening.

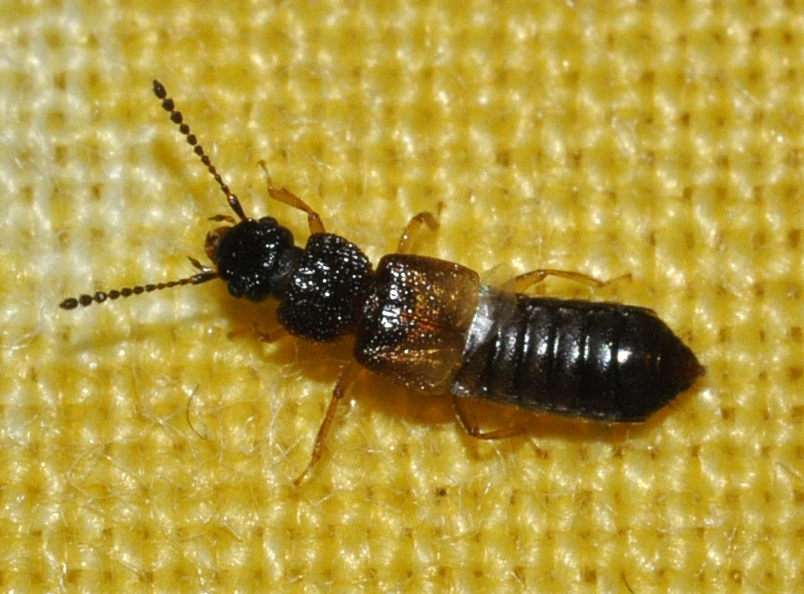

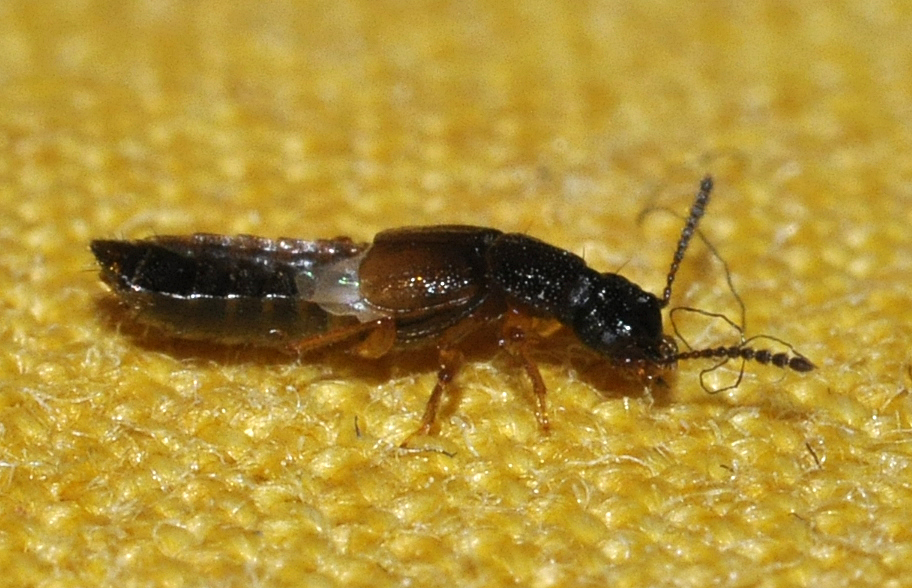
