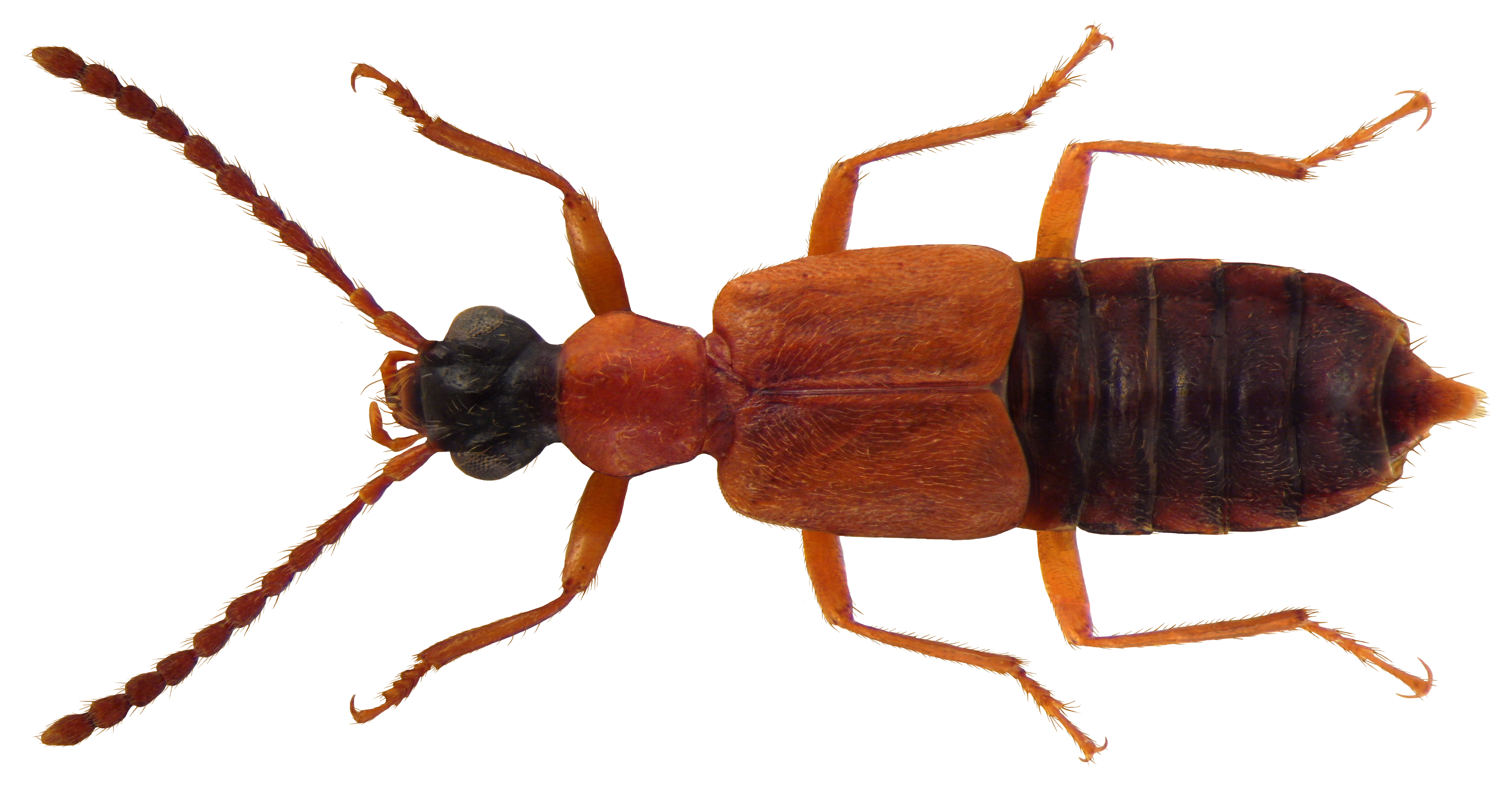
- Deleaster dichrous 6.5-8.0 mm

Scientific classification
- Kingdom: Animalia
- Phylum: Arthropoda
- Class: Insecta
- Order: Coleoptera
- Suborder: Polyphaga
- Infraorder: Staphyliniformia
- Family: Staphylinidae
- Genus: Deleaster
- Species: D. dichrous

Binomial name
- Deleaster dichrous Gravenhorst, 1802

= Deleaster dichrous =

Species of beetle

Deleaster dichrous is a species of rove beetle (Staphylinidae) that is native to Europe, specifically the United Kingdom. It has also been introduced to North America.

== Description ==
Deleaster dichrous grows from 6.5 to 8mm (0.2-0.3 inches). The head and abdomen of this species is a dark brown while the antennae, legs, and the rest of the body is orange.

== Habitat ==
In Europe where they are natively found, Deleaster dichrous occurs in lowlands and on mountain bases. They are found crawling through open grasslands, damp forests, and areas by the coast, where they are usually hidden by long grasses. In more urbanized areas, they occur in parks and landfills.

== Behavior ==
Although this species can be seen during the daytime, it is wildly believed that Deleaster dichrous is nocturnal as they are commonly seen flying into light traps.

When provoked, Deleaster dichrous will release a fluid in defense. This fluid is unable to harm humans and is intended to divert other predators such as foraging insects. Adult Deleaster dichrous are most common during spring and summer.
