= Oxytelus puncticeps =

Scientific classification
- Kingdom: Animalia
- Phylum: Arthropoda
- Clade: Pancrustacea
- Class: Insecta
- Order: Coleoptera
- Suborder: Polyphaga
- Infraorder: Staphyliniformia
- Family: Staphylinidae
- Genus: Oxytelus
- Species: O. puncticeps

Binomial name
- Oxytelus puncticeps Kraatz, 1859

Synonyms
- Oxytelus monoceros Cameron, 1919

Species of beetle

Oxytelus puncticeps is a species of rove beetle widely spread in Asia and Africa. It is found in China, Hong Kong, Taiwan, Japan, Philippines, Vietnam, Indonesia, Borneo, Sri Lanka, India, and Sub-Saharan Africa.
