= Manda nearctica =

Scientific classification
- Domain: Eukaryota
- Kingdom: Animalia
- Phylum: Arthropoda
- Class: Insecta
- Order: Coleoptera
- Suborder: Polyphaga
- Infraorder: Staphyliniformia
- Family: Staphylinidae
- Genus: Manda
- Species: M. nearctica

Binomial name
- Manda nearctica Moore, 1964

Species of beetle

Manda nearctica is a species of spiny-legged rove beetle in the family Staphylinidae. It is found in North America.
