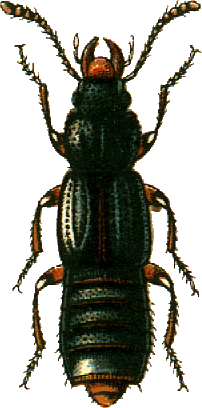

Scientific classification
- Kingdom: Animalia
- Phylum: Arthropoda
- Clade: Pancrustacea
- Class: Insecta
- Order: Coleoptera
- Suborder: Polyphaga
- Infraorder: Staphyliniformia
- Family: Staphylinidae
- Genus: Coprophilus
- Species: C. striatulus

Binomial name
- Coprophilus striatulus (Fabricius, 1793)

= Coprophilus striatulus =

Species of beetle

Coprophilus striatulus is a species of spiny-legged rove beetle in the family Staphylinidae. It is found in Europe and Northern Asia (excluding China) and North America.

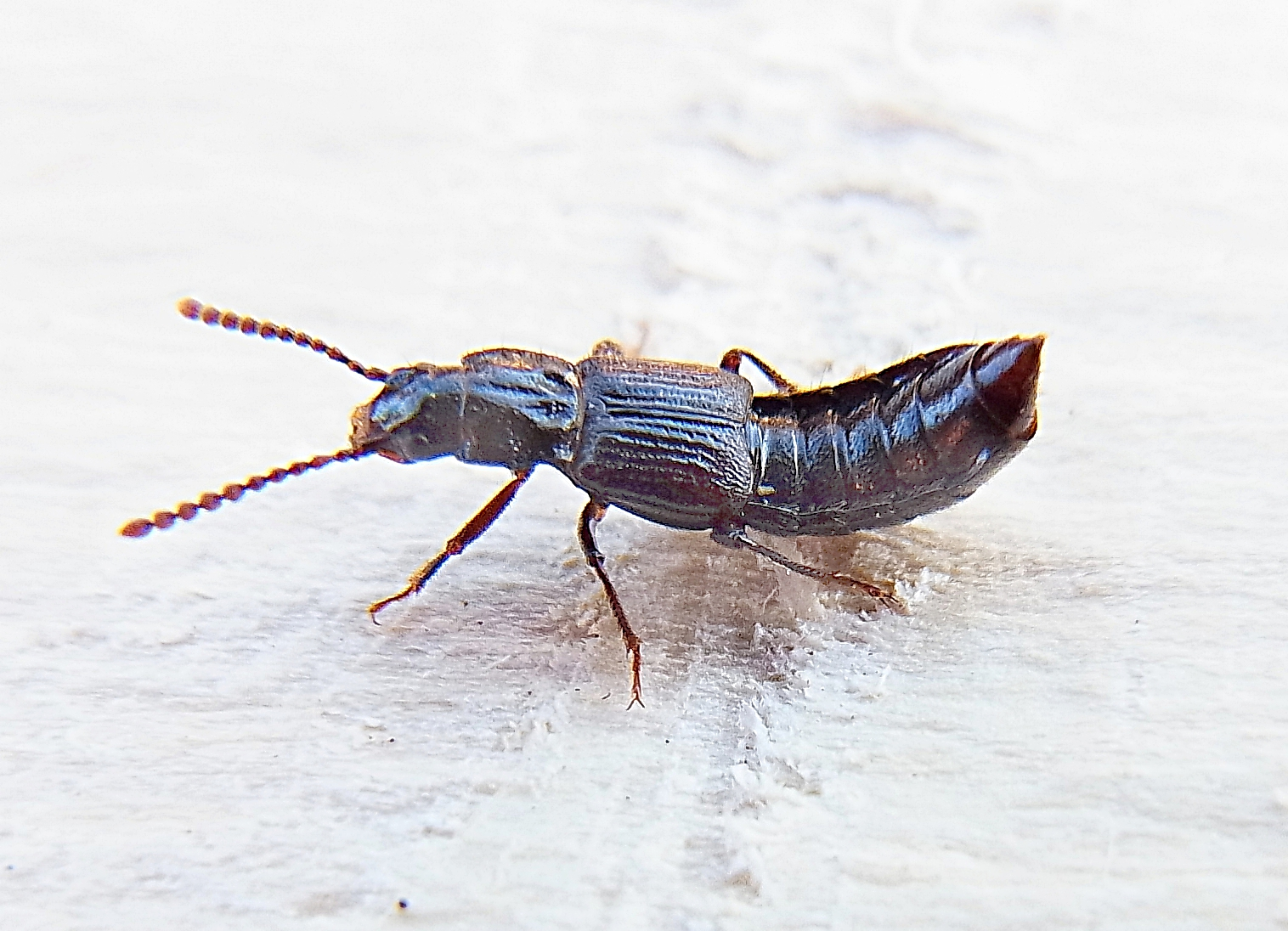
