= Carpelimus pertenuis =

Scientific classification
- Kingdom: Animalia
- Phylum: Arthropoda
- Class: Insecta
- Order: Coleoptera
- Suborder: Polyphaga
- Infraorder: Staphyliniformia
- Family: Staphylinidae
- Genus: Carpelimus
- Species: C. pertenuis

Binomial name
- Carpelimus pertenuis (Casey, 1889)

Species of beetle

Carpelimus pertenuis is a species of spiny-legged rove beetle in the family Staphylinidae. It is found in North America.
