= Apocellus analis =

Scientific classification
- Kingdom: Animalia
- Phylum: Arthropoda
- Class: Insecta
- Order: Coleoptera
- Suborder: Polyphaga
- Infraorder: Staphyliniformia
- Family: Staphylinidae
- Genus: Apocellus
- Species: A. analis

Binomial name
- Apocellus analis LeConte, 1877

Species of beetle

Apocellus analis is a species of spiny-legged rove beetle in the family Staphylinidae. It is found in Central America and North America.
