= Ochthephilus columbiensis =

Scientific classification
- Domain: Eukaryota
- Kingdom: Animalia
- Phylum: Arthropoda
- Class: Insecta
- Order: Coleoptera
- Suborder: Polyphaga
- Infraorder: Staphyliniformia
- Family: Staphylinidae
- Genus: Ochthephilus
- Species: O. columbiensis

Binomial name
- Ochthephilus columbiensis (Hatch, 1957)

Species of beetle

Ochthephilus columbiensis is a species of spiny-legged rove beetle in the family Staphylinidae. It is found in North America.
