= Platystethus americanus =

Scientific classification
- Kingdom: Animalia
- Phylum: Arthropoda
- Class: Insecta
- Order: Coleoptera
- Suborder: Polyphaga
- Infraorder: Staphyliniformia
- Family: Staphylinidae
- Genus: Platystethus
- Species: P. americanus

Binomial name
- Platystethus americanus Erichson, 1840

Species of beetle

Platystethus americanus is a species of spiny-legged rove beetle in the family Staphylinidae. It is found in Central America, North America, and Oceania.
