= Apocellus sphaericollis =

Scientific classification
- Domain: Eukaryota
- Kingdom: Animalia
- Phylum: Arthropoda
- Class: Insecta
- Order: Coleoptera
- Suborder: Polyphaga
- Infraorder: Staphyliniformia
- Family: Staphylinidae
- Genus: Apocellus
- Species: A. sphaericollis

Binomial name
- Apocellus sphaericollis (Say, 1831)

Species of beetle

Apocellus sphaericollis is a species of spiny-legged rove beetle in the family Staphylinidae. It is found in Central America and North America.
