= Oxytelus nigriceps =

Scientific classification
- Kingdom: Animalia
- Phylum: Arthropoda
- Clade: Pancrustacea
- Class: Insecta
- Order: Coleoptera
- Suborder: Polyphaga
- Infraorder: Staphyliniformia
- Family: Staphylinidae
- Genus: Oxytelus
- Species: O. nigriceps

Binomial name
- Oxytelus nigriceps Kraatz, 1859

Species of beetle

Oxytelus nigriceps is a species of rove beetle widely spread in Asia. It is found in China, Hong Kong, South Korea, Japan, Philippines, Vietnam, Thailand, Myanmar, Malaysia, Singapore, Indonesia, New Guinea, Bismarck Islands, Pakistan, India, Nepal, Sri Lanka, and Bangladesh.

== Description ==
Male and female both having similar length of about 4.1 mm.
