= Oxytelus bengalensis =

Scientific classification
- Kingdom: Animalia
- Phylum: Arthropoda
- Class: Insecta
- Order: Coleoptera
- Suborder: Polyphaga
- Infraorder: Staphyliniformia
- Family: Staphylinidae
- Genus: Oxytelus
- Species: O. bengalensis

Binomial name
- Oxytelus bengalensis Erichson, 1840

Species of beetle

Oxytelus bengalensis is a species of rove beetle widely spread in Asia. It is found in China, Hong Kong, South Korea, Japan, Vietnam, Laos, Myanmar, Thailand, Malaysia, Singapore, Bangladesh, Sri Lanka, Nepal, Pakistan and India.
