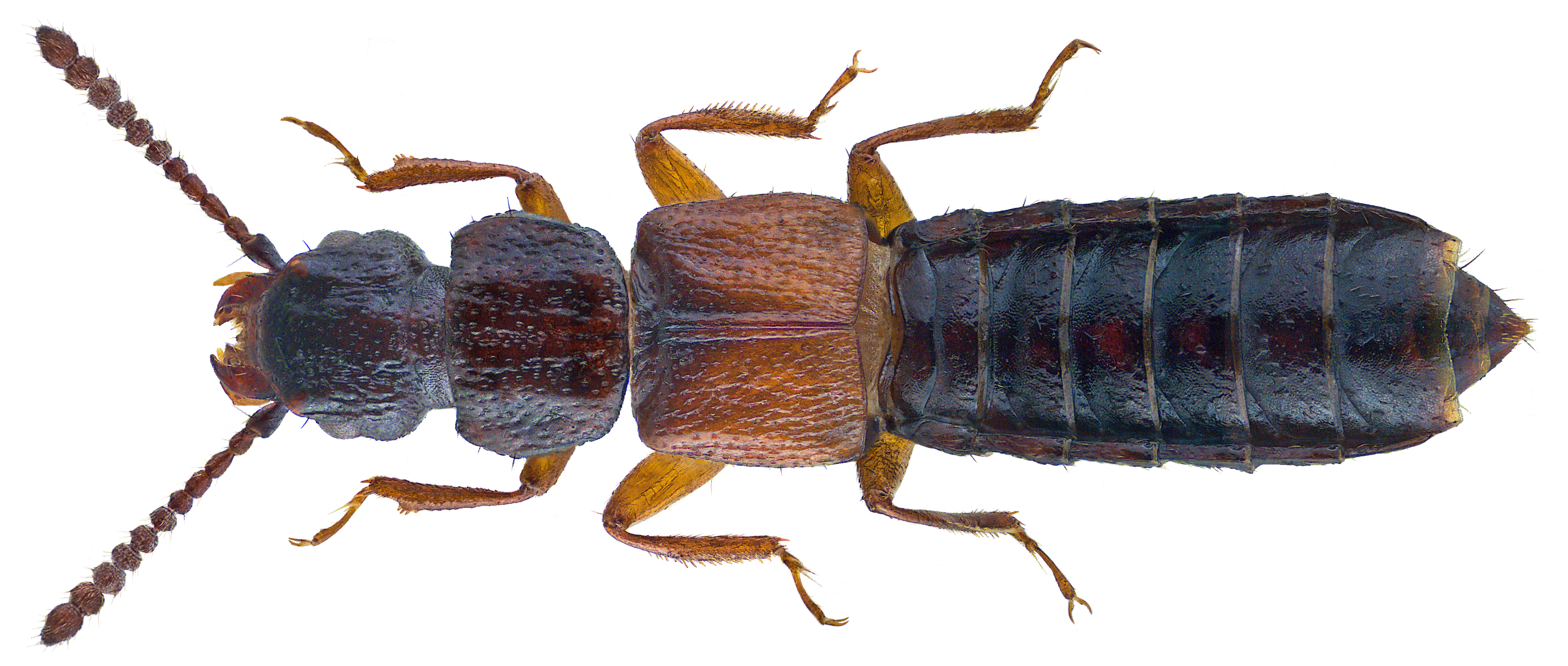
- Anotylus insecatus 4.8 mm (3.6 to 4.9 mm)

Scientific classification
- Kingdom: Animalia
- Phylum: Arthropoda
- Class: Insecta
- Order: Coleoptera
- Suborder: Polyphaga
- Infraorder: Staphyliniformia
- Family: Staphylinidae
- Genus: Anotylus
- Species: A. insecatus

Binomial name
- Anotylus insecatus Gravenhorst, 1806

= Anotylus insecatus =

Species of beetle

Anotylus insecatus is a species of rove beetles native to Europe.
