= Carpelimus quadripunctatus =

Scientific classification
- Domain: Eukaryota
- Kingdom: Animalia
- Phylum: Arthropoda
- Class: Insecta
- Order: Coleoptera
- Suborder: Polyphaga
- Infraorder: Staphyliniformia
- Family: Staphylinidae
- Genus: Carpelimus
- Species: C. quadripunctatus

Binomial name
- Carpelimus quadripunctatus (Say, 1831)

Synonyms
- Carpelimus laticollis (LeConte, 1863)

Species of beetle

Carpelimus quadripunctatus is a species of spiny-legged rove beetle in the family Staphylinidae. It is found in North America.
