= Ochthephilus biimpressus =

Scientific classification
- Domain: Eukaryota
- Kingdom: Animalia
- Phylum: Arthropoda
- Class: Insecta
- Order: Coleoptera
- Suborder: Polyphaga
- Infraorder: Staphyliniformia
- Family: Staphylinidae
- Genus: Ochthephilus
- Species: O. biimpressus

Binomial name
- Ochthephilus biimpressus (Mäklin, 1852)

Species of beetle

Ochthephilus biimpressus is a species of spiny-legged rove beetle in the family Staphylinidae. It is found in North America.
