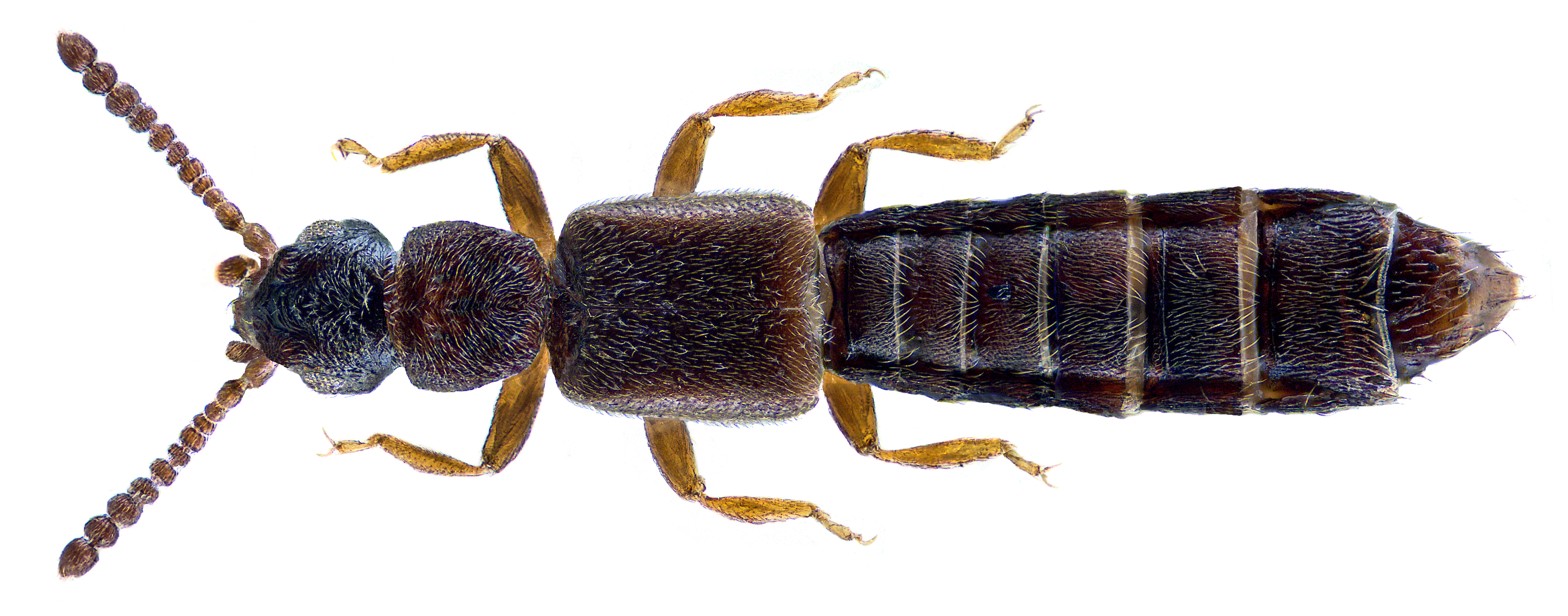
- Carpelimus gracilis 1.7 mm (1.4 to 1.7 mm)

Scientific classification
- Domain: Eukaryota
- Kingdom: Animalia
- Phylum: Arthropoda
- Class: Insecta
- Order: Coleoptera
- Suborder: Polyphaga
- Infraorder: Staphyliniformia
- Family: Staphylinidae
- Genus: Carpelimus
- Species: C. gracilis

Binomial name
- Carpelimus gracilis (Mannerheim, 1830)

= Carpelimus gracilis =

Species of beetle

Carpelimus gracilis is a species of rove beetles native to Europe.
