= Aploderus =

Scientific classification
- Domain: Eukaryota
- Kingdom: Animalia
- Phylum: Arthropoda
- Class: Insecta
- Order: Coleoptera
- Suborder: Polyphaga
- Infraorder: Staphyliniformia
- Family: Staphylinidae
- Subfamily: Oxytelinae
- Tribe: Oxytelini
- Genus: Aploderus; Stephens, 1833

Genus of beetles

Aploderus is a genus of beetles belonging to the family Staphylinidae.

The genus was first described by Stephens in 1833.

The species of this genus are found in Europe and North America.

Species:

- Aploderus caelatus
- Aploderus caesus
- Aploderus disparatus
- Aploderus szechuanensis
- Aploderus zhouae
