= Oxytelus varipennis =

Scientific classification
- Kingdom: Animalia
- Phylum: Arthropoda
- Class: Insecta
- Order: Coleoptera
- Suborder: Polyphaga
- Infraorder: Staphyliniformia
- Family: Staphylinidae
- Genus: Oxytelus
- Species: O. varipennis

Binomial name
- Oxytelus varipennis Kraatz, 1859

Species of beetle

Oxytelus varipennis is a species of rove beetle widely spread in Asia and Europe. It is found in China, Hong Kong, South Korea, Japan, Myanmar, Indonesia, Pakistan, India, Sri Lanka, Nepal, Bangladesh, and Egypt.

== Description ==
Male is about 4.6 mm and female is 3.7 mm in length.

The Egyptian population is assigned as a subspecies: O. v. pharaonum.
