= Oxytelus incisus =

Scientific classification
- Kingdom: Animalia
- Phylum: Arthropoda
- Class: Insecta
- Order: Coleoptera
- Suborder: Polyphaga
- Infraorder: Staphyliniformia
- Family: Staphylinidae
- Genus: Oxytelus
- Species: O. incisus

Binomial name
- Oxytelus incisus Motschulsky, 1857

Synonyms
- Oxytelus bledioides Blackburn, 1885; Oxytelus cordovensis Bernhauer, 1910; Oxytelus ferrugineus Kraatz, 1859; Oxytelus laevior Sharp, 1874; Oxytelus laxipennis Fairmaire, 1893

Species of beetle

Oxytelus incisus is a species of rove beetle with cosmopolitan distribution across the continents.
