= Oxytelus migrator =

Scientific classification
- Kingdom: Animalia
- Phylum: Arthropoda
- Clade: Pancrustacea
- Class: Insecta
- Order: Coleoptera
- Suborder: Polyphaga
- Infraorder: Staphyliniformia
- Family: Staphylinidae
- Genus: Oxytelus
- Species: O. migrator

Binomial name
- Oxytelus migrator Fauvel, 1904

Species of beetle

Oxytelus migrator is a species of rove beetle widely spread in Asia and Europe. It is found in China, Hong Kong, Japan, Vietnam, Thailand, Malaysia, Indonesia, and Sri Lanka.
