= Platystethus degener =

Scientific classification
- Domain: Eukaryota
- Kingdom: Animalia
- Phylum: Arthropoda
- Class: Insecta
- Order: Coleoptera
- Suborder: Polyphaga
- Infraorder: Staphyliniformia
- Family: Staphylinidae
- Genus: Platystethus
- Species: P. degener

Binomial name
- Platystethus degener Mulsant & Rey, 1878

Species of beetle

Platystethus degener is a species of spiny-legged rove beetle in the family Staphylinidae. It is found in Europe and Northern Asia (excluding China), North America, and Southern Asia.
