= Coprophilus sexualis =

Scientific classification
- Domain: Eukaryota
- Kingdom: Animalia
- Phylum: Arthropoda
- Class: Insecta
- Order: Coleoptera
- Suborder: Polyphaga
- Infraorder: Staphyliniformia
- Family: Staphylinidae
- Genus: Coprophilus
- Species: C. sexualis

Binomial name
- Coprophilus sexualis Leech, 1939

Species of beetle

Coprophilus sexualis is a species of spiny-legged rove beetle in the family Staphylinidae. It is found in North America.
