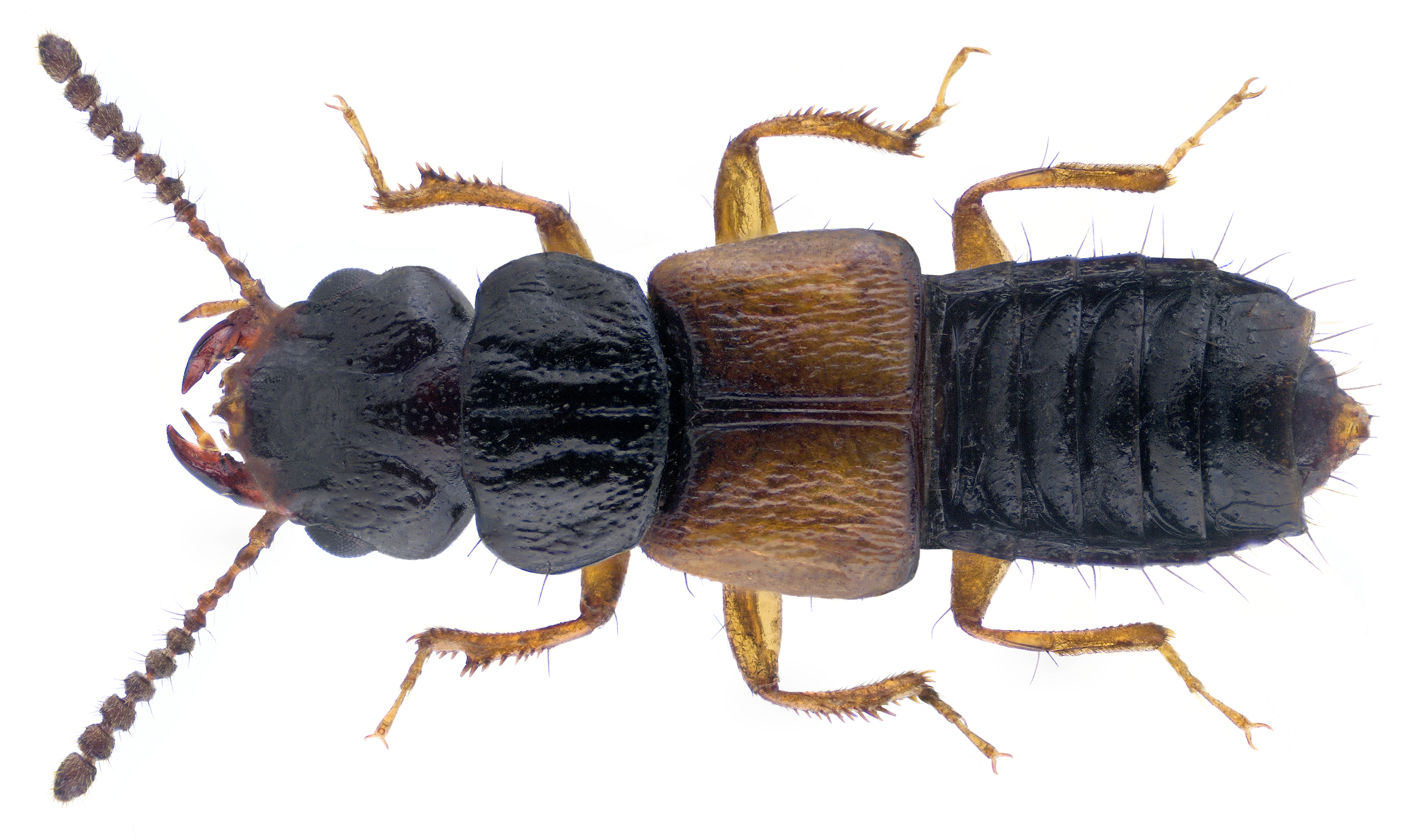
- Oxytelus laqueatus

Scientific classification
- Domain: Eukaryota
- Kingdom: Animalia
- Phylum: Arthropoda
- Class: Insecta
- Order: Coleoptera
- Suborder: Polyphaga
- Infraorder: Staphyliniformia
- Family: Staphylinidae
- Genus: Oxytelus
- Species: O. laqueatus

Binomial name
- Oxytelus laqueatus (Marsham, 1802)

= Oxytelus laqueatus =

Species of beetle

Oxytelus laqueatus is a species of spiny-legged rove beetle in the family Staphylinidae. It is found in Africa, Europe and Northern Asia (excluding China), Central America, North America, South America, and Southern Asia.
