= Carpelimus bilineatus =

Scientific classification
- Domain: Eukaryota
- Kingdom: Animalia
- Phylum: Arthropoda
- Class: Insecta
- Order: Coleoptera
- Suborder: Polyphaga
- Infraorder: Staphyliniformia
- Family: Staphylinidae
- Genus: Carpelimus
- Species: C. bilineatus

Binomial name
- Carpelimus bilineatus Stephens, 1834

Synonyms
- Carpelimus riparius (Lacordaire, 1835)

Species of beetle

Carpelimus bilineatus is a species of spiny-legged rove beetle in the family Staphylinidae. It is found in Africa, Australia, Europe and Northern Asia (excluding China), North America, and South America. It was first described by James Francis Stephens in 1834.
