= Neoxus =

Scientific classification
- Domain: Eukaryota
- Kingdom: Animalia
- Phylum: Arthropoda
- Class: Insecta
- Order: Coleoptera
- Suborder: Polyphaga
- Infraorder: Staphyliniformia
- Family: Staphylinidae
- Tribe: Oxytelini
- Genus: Neoxus; Herman, 1970

Genus of beetles

Neoxus is a genus of spiny-legged rove beetles in the family Staphylinidae. There is one described species in Neoxus, N. crassicornis.
