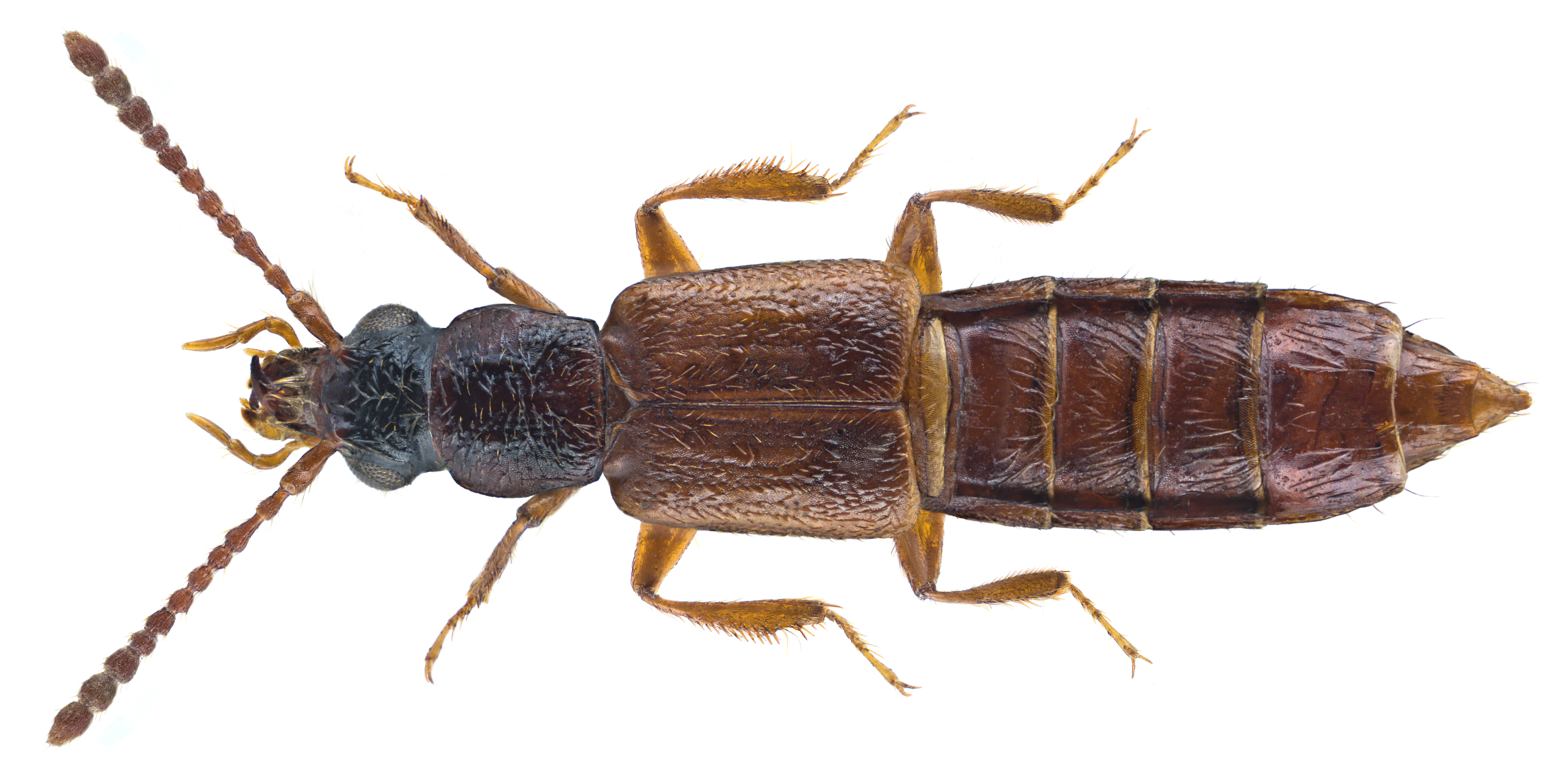
- Manda mandibularis

Scientific classification
- Domain: Eukaryota
- Kingdom: Animalia
- Phylum: Arthropoda
- Class: Insecta
- Order: Coleoptera
- Suborder: Polyphaga
- Infraorder: Staphyliniformia
- Family: Staphylinidae
- Tribe: Oxytelini
- Genus: Manda; Blackwelder, 1952

= Manda (beetle) =

Genus of beetles

Manda is a genus of spiny-legged rove beetles in the family Staphylinidae. There are at least two described species in Manda.

== Species ==
These two species belong to the genus Manda:

- Manda mandibularis (Gyllenhal, 1827)^{g}
- Manda nearctica Moore, 1964^{i c g b}

Data sources: i = ITIS, c = Catalogue of Life, g = GBIF, b = Bugguide.net
