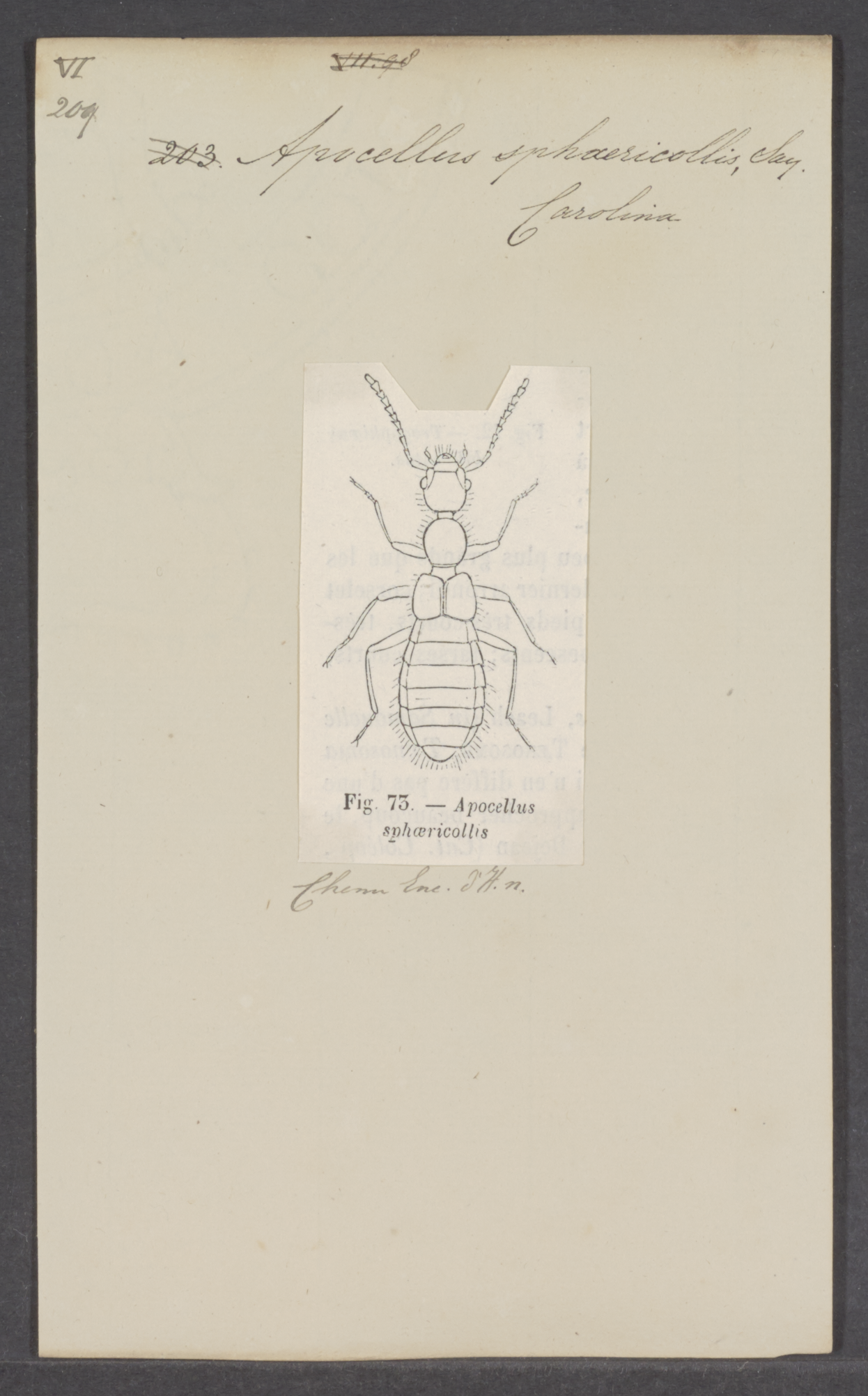

Scientific classification
- Kingdom: Animalia
- Phylum: Arthropoda
- Class: Insecta
- Order: Coleoptera
- Suborder: Polyphaga
- Infraorder: Staphyliniformia
- Family: Staphylinidae
- Tribe: Oxytelini
- Genus: Apocellus; Erichson, 1839

= Apocellus =

Genus of beetles

Apocellus is a genus of spiny-legged rove beetles in the family Staphylinidae. There are about 11 described species in Apocellus.

== Species ==
These 11 species belong to the genus Apocellus:

- Apocellus analis LeConte, 1877
- Apocellus andinus
- Apocellus bicolor Casey, 1885
- Apocellus brevipennis Casey, 1885
- Apocellus cognatus Sharp, 1887
- Apocellus crassicornis Casey, 1885
- Apocellus gracilicornis Casey, 1885
- Apocellus niger Casey, 1886
- Apocellus sphaericollis (Say, 1831)
- Apocellus stilicoides LeConte, 1877
- Apocellus ustulatus Erichson, 1840
