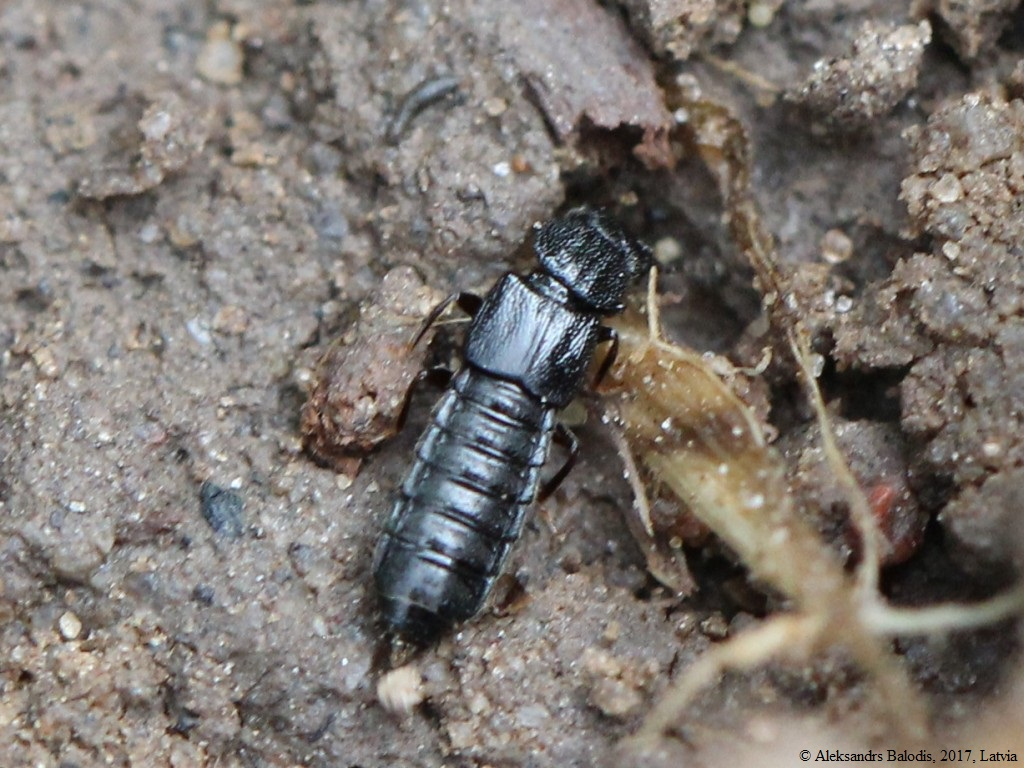

Scientific classification
- Kingdom: Animalia
- Phylum: Arthropoda
- Clade: Pancrustacea
- Class: Insecta
- Order: Coleoptera
- Suborder: Polyphaga
- Infraorder: Staphyliniformia
- Family: Staphylinidae
- Subfamily: Oxytelinae
- Tribe: Oxytelini
- Genus: Oxytelus; Gravenhorst, 1802

= Oxytelus =

Genus of beetles

Oxytelus is a genus of spiny-legged rove beetles in the family Staphylinidae. There are more than 50 described species in Oxytelus.

== Species ==
These 57 species belong to the genus Oxytelus:

- Oxytelus aligarhensis Singh, Debnath, Qamar & Gupta, 2026
- Oxytelus antennalis Fauvel, 1889
- Oxytelus assingi Schuelke, 2012
- Oxytelus atricapillus Germar, 1825
- Oxytelus bengalensis Erichson, 1840
- Oxytelus bicornis Germar, 1823
- Oxytelus chamoliensis Singh, Debnath, Qamar & Gupta, 2026
- Oxytelus chapini Blackwelder
- Oxytelus consobrinus Stephens, 1834
- Oxytelus convergens LeConte, 1877
- Oxytelus cornutus Bernhauer, 1936
- Oxytelus crenaticollis
- Oxytelus densus Casey
- Oxytelus depauperatus Wollaston, 1867
- Oxytelus eremus Blackwelder
- Oxytelus ferrugineus Kraatz, 1859
- Oxytelus fortesculpturatus Scheerpeltz
- Oxytelus foveicollis Scheerpeltz
- Oxytelus fulvipes Erichson, 1839
- Oxytelus fusciceps Fauvel, 1898
- Oxytelus fuscipennis Stephens, 1834
- Oxytelus hostilis Bernhauer
- Oxytelus incisus Motschulsky, 1857
- Oxytelus incolumis Erichson, 1840
- Oxytelus invenustus Casey, 1894
- Oxytelus jacobsoni Cameron, 1928
- Oxytelus laqueatus (Marsham, 1802)
- Oxytelus luceus Bidessus
- Oxytelus malaisei Scheerpeltz
- Oxytelus mashonensis
- Oxytelus megaceros Fabricius
- Oxytelus migrator Fauvel, 1904
- Oxytelus miles Cameron, 1928
- Oxytelus montanus Casey, 1894
- Oxytelus mortuorum Bidessus
- Oxytelus nigriceps Kraatz
- Oxytelus nigripennis Bernhauer
- Oxytelus nimius Casey, 1894
- Oxytelus okahandjanus
- Oxytelus pallipennis Grimmer, 1841
- Oxytelus parvulus Mulsant & Rey, 1861
- Oxytelus pensylvanicus Erichson, 1840
- Oxytelus piceus (Linnaeus, 1767)
- Oxytelus planicollis Scheerpeltz
- Oxytelus pluvius Blackwelder
- Oxytelus pristinus Scudder, 1876
- Oxytelus puncticeps Kraatz
- Oxytelus rufulus
- Oxytelus schubotzi Bernhauer
- Oxytelus sculptus Gravenhorst, 1806
- Oxytelus striaticeps Cameron, 1928
- Oxytelus subapterus Wickham, 1913
- Oxytelus subsculpturates Cameron, 1928
- Oxytelus tenuesculpturatus Sch.
- Oxytelus uncifer
- Oxytelus varipennis Kraatz
- † Oxytelus levis Förster, 1891
- † Oxytelus ominosus Förster, 1891
- † Oxytelus proaevus Heer, 1862
