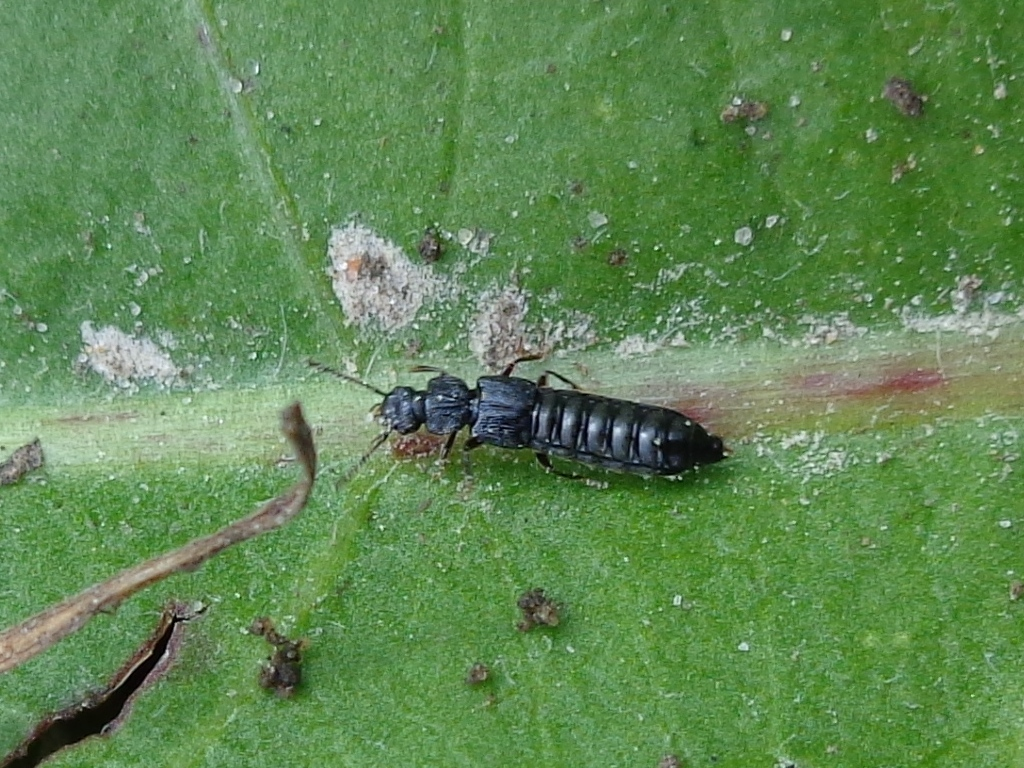
- Anotylus rugosus

Scientific classification
- Kingdom: Animalia
- Phylum: Arthropoda
- Clade: Pancrustacea
- Class: Insecta
- Order: Coleoptera
- Suborder: Polyphaga
- Infraorder: Staphyliniformia
- Family: Staphylinidae
- Tribe: Oxytelini
- Genus: Anotylus; Thomson, 1859

= Anotylus =

Genus of beetles

Anotylus is a genus of spiny-legged rove beetles in the family Staphylinidae. There are more than 90 described species in Anotylus.

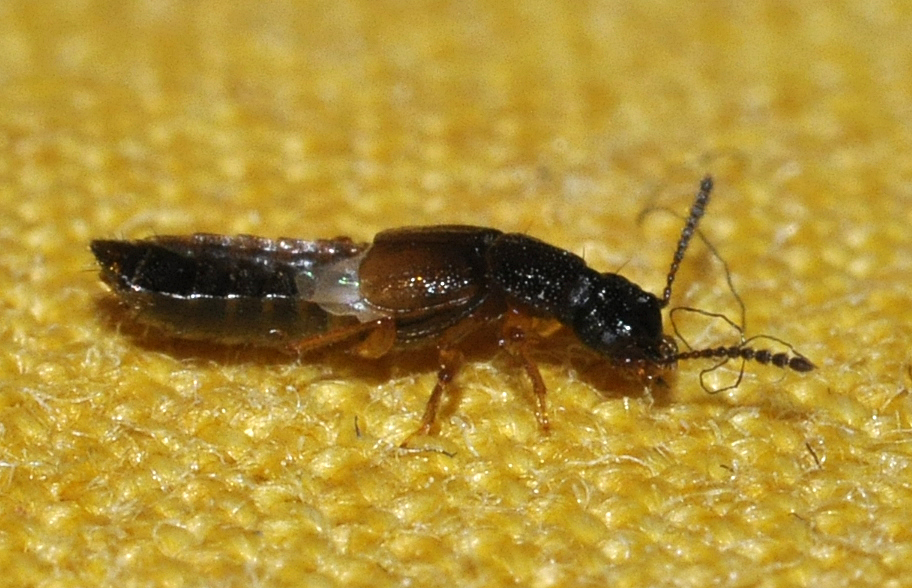
Anotylus rugosus

== Species ==
These 95 species belong to the genus Anotylus:

- Anotylus affinis (Czwalina, 1871)
- Anotylus alpicola (Casey, 1894)
- Anotylus antennarius Bernhauer, 1907
- Anotylus arellanoae Makranczy, 2011
- Anotylus athenensis (R.Dvorak, 1954)
- Anotylus benisculptilis Wang, Zhou & Lü, 2017
- Anotylus bernhaueri (Ganglbauer, 1898)
- Anotylus breviceps (Casey, 1894)
- Anotylus brevipennis (Fauvel, 1872)
- Anotylus brevisculptilis Wang, Zhou & Lü, 2017
- Anotylus caffer (Erichson, 1840)
- Anotylus chinkiangensis Bernhauer, 1938
- Anotylus clavatus (Strand, 1946)
- Anotylus clypeonitens (Pandellé, 1867)
- Anotylus cognatus Sharp, 1874
- Anotylus complanatus (Erichson, 1839)
- Anotylus coonoor Makranczy, 2017
- Anotylus corcyranus Coiffait, 1968
- Anotylus debae Makranczy, 2011
- Anotylus deboeri Makranczy, 2011
- Anotylus densus (Casey, 1894)
- Anotylus engeli Makranczy, 2011
- Anotylus exasperatus (Kraatz, 1859)
- Anotylus exiguus (Erichson, 1840)
- Anotylus extrasculptilis Wang, Zhou & Lü, 2017
- Anotylus fairmairei (Pandellé, 1867)
- Anotylus fraternus (Cameron)
- Anotylus ganapati Makranczy, 2017
- Anotylus glareosus (Wollaston, 1854)
- Anotylus gunung Makranczy, 2017
- Anotylus hamatus (Fairmaire & Laboulbène, 1856)
- Anotylus hamuliger (Fauvel, 1905)
- Anotylus hartmanni Makranczy, 2017
- Anotylus herculis (Bernhauer, 1936)
- Anotylus hybridus (Eppelsheim, 1878)
- Anotylus ijen Makranczy, 2017
- Anotylus incilis (Sharp, 1887)
- Anotylus insecatus (Gravenhorst, 1806)
- Anotylus insignitus (Gravenhorst, 1806)
- Anotylus intricatus (Erichson, 1840)
- Anotylus inustus (Gravenhorst, 1806)
- Anotylus jambi Makranczy, 2017
- Anotylus kabasi Makranczy, 2017
- Anotylus latiusculus (Kraatz, 1859)
- Anotylus linaxi Makranczy, 2017
- Anotylus luridipennis (Luze, 1904)
- Anotylus maritimus Thomson, 1861
- Anotylus mendus Herman, 1970
- Anotylus mimulus (Sharp, 1874)
- Anotylus munitus (Casey, 1894)
- Anotylus mutator (Lohse, 1963)
- Anotylus nanus (Erichson, 1840)
- Anotylus neotomae (Hatch, 1957)
- Anotylus nigelisculptilis Wang, Zhou & Lü, 2017
- Anotylus niger (LeConte, 1877)
- Anotylus nitelisculptilis Wang, Zhou & Lü, 2017
- Anotylus nitidifrons (Wollaston, 1871)
- Anotylus nitidulus (Gravenhorst, 1802)
- Anotylus obscurellus (Fauvel, 1905)
- Anotylus opaciceps Bernhauer, 1938
- Anotylus petzi (Bernhauer, 1914)
- Anotylus placusinus (LeConte, 1877)
- Anotylus plagiatus (Rosenhauer, 1856)
- Anotylus politus (Erichson, 1840)
- Anotylus pumilus (Erichson, 1839)
- Anotylus rectisculptilis Wang, Zhou & Lü, 2017
- Anotylus riedeli Makranczy, 2017
- Anotylus rugifrons (Hochhuth, 1849)
- Anotylus rugosus (Fabricius, 1775)
- Anotylus rurukan Makranczy, 2017
- Anotylus saulcyi (Pandellé, 1867)
- Anotylus schatzmayri (Koch, 1937)
- Anotylus schawalleri Makranczy, 2017
- Anotylus schillhammeri Makranczy, 2017
- Anotylus schuelkei Makranczy, 2017
- Anotylus sculpturatus (Gravenhorst, 1806)
- Anotylus sikkimi Fauvel, 1905
- Anotylus sobrinus (LeConte, 1877)
- Anotylus spec Makranczy, 2017
- Anotylus speculifrons (Kraatz, 1857)
- Anotylus steineri Makranczy, 2013
- Anotylus subanophthalmicus Outerelo, Gamara & Salgado, 1998
- Anotylus subsericeus Bernhauer, 1938
- Anotylus suspectus (Casey, 1894)
- Anotylus tanator Makranczy, 2017
- Anotylus tetracarinatus (Block, 1799)
- Anotylus tetratoma (Czwalina, 1871)
- Anotylus topali Makranczy, 2017
- Anotylus torretassoi (Koch, 1932)
- Anotylus varisculptilis Wang, Zhou & Lü, 2017
- Anotylus vegrandis (Casey, 1894)
- Anotylus vicinus Sharp, 1874
- Anotylus vinsoni (Cameron, 1936)
- Anotylus zavadili (Roubal, 1941)
- † Oxytelus gibbulus (Eppelsheim, 1877)
