= Ochthephilus =

Scientific classification
- Domain: Eukaryota
- Kingdom: Animalia
- Phylum: Arthropoda
- Class: Insecta
- Order: Coleoptera
- Suborder: Polyphaga
- Infraorder: Staphyliniformia
- Family: Staphylinidae
- Subfamily: Oxytelinae
- Tribe: Thinobiini
- Genus: Ochthephilus; Mulsant & Rey, 1856

Genus of beetles

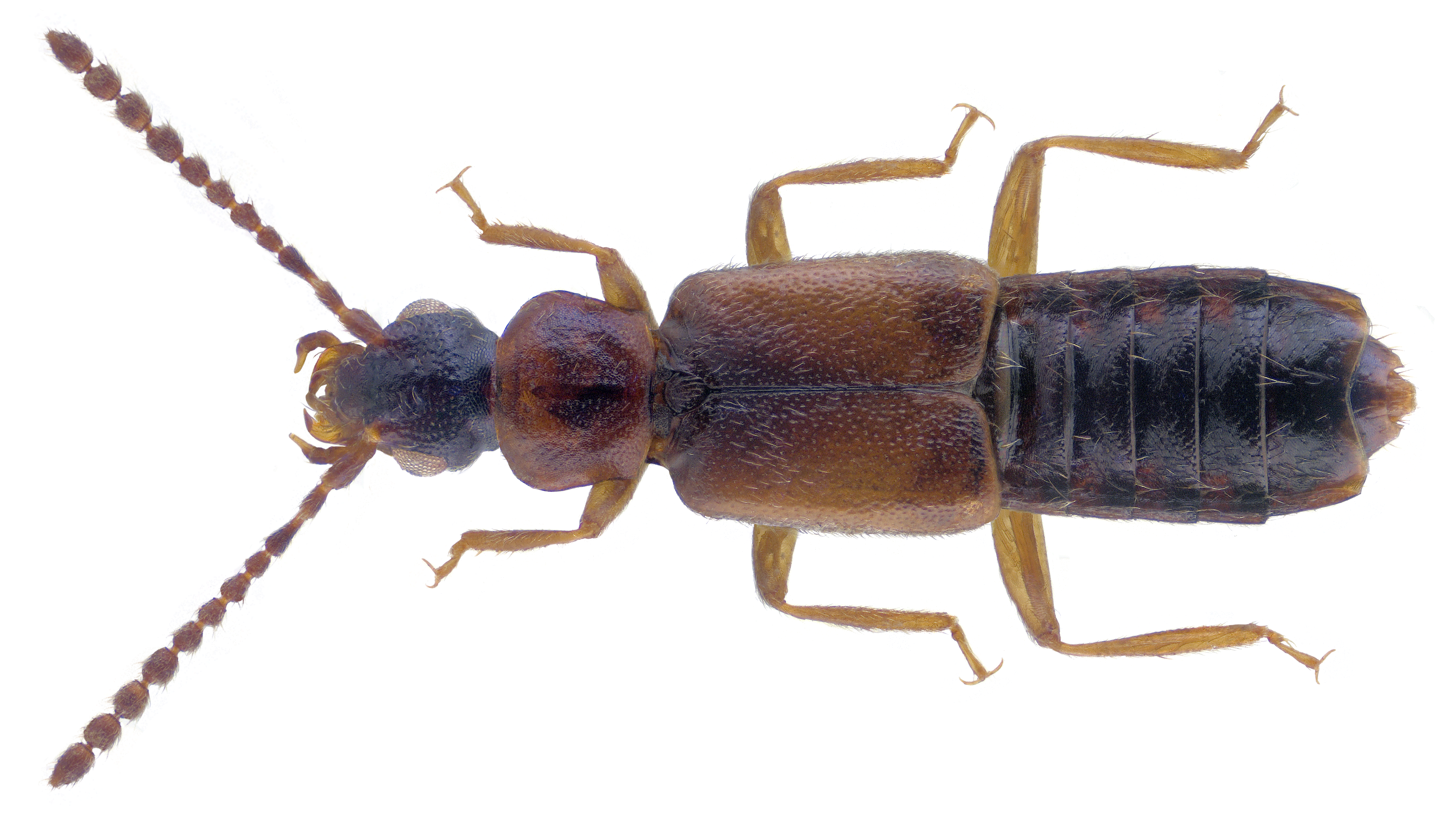
Ochthephilus aureus

Ochthephilus is a genus of spiny-legged rove beetles in the family Staphylinidae. There are at least 50 described species in Ochthephilus.

== Species ==
These 50 species belong to the genus Ochthephilus:

- Ochthephilus andalusiacus (Fagel, 1957)
- Ochthephilus angustatus (Erichson, 1840)
- Ochthephilus angustior (Bernhauer, 1943)
- Ochthephilus ashei Makranczy, 2014
- Ochthephilus assingi Makranczy, 2014
- Ochthephilus aureus (Fauvel, 1871)
- Ochthephilus biimpressus (Mäklin, 1852)
- Ochthephilus brachypterus Jeannel & Jarrige, 1949
- Ochthephilus californicus Makranczy, 2014
- Ochthephilus carnicus (Scheerpeltz, 1950)
- Ochthephilus columbiensis (Hatch, 1957)
- Ochthephilus corsicus (Fagel, 1956)
- Ochthephilus davidi Makranczy, 2014
- Ochthephilus emarginatus (Fauvel, 1871)
- Ochthephilus enigmaticus Makranczy, 2014
- Ochthephilus filum (Fauvel, 1875)
- Ochthephilus forticornis (Hochhuth, 1860)
- Ochthephilus gusarovi Makranczy, 2014
- Ochthephilus hammondi Makranczy, 2014
- Ochthephilus incognitus Makranczy, 2014
- Ochthephilus indicus Makranczy, 2014
- Ochthephilus itoi Makranczy, 2014
- Ochthephilus jailensis (Scheerpeltz, 1950)
- Ochthephilus kirschenblatti Makranczy, 2014
- Ochthephilus kleebergi Makranczy, 2014
- Ochthephilus legrosi (Jarrige, 1949)
- Ochthephilus loebli Makranczy, 2014
- Ochthephilus masatakai Watanabe, 2007
- Ochthephilus mediterraneus (Scheerpeltz, 1950)
- Ochthephilus merkli Makranczy, 2014
- Ochthephilus omalinus (Erichson, 1840)
- Ochthephilus planus (LeConte, 1861)
- Ochthephilus praepositus Mulsant & Rey, 1878
- Ochthephilus qingyianus Makranczy, 2014
- Ochthephilus ritae Makranczy, 2014
- Ochthephilus rosenhaueri Kiesenwetter, 1850
- Ochthephilus ruteri (Jarrige, 1949)
- Ochthephilus scheerpeltzi (Fagel, 1951)
- Ochthephilus schuelkei Makranczy, 2014
- Ochthephilus strandi (Scheerpeltz, 1950)
- Ochthephilus szarukani Makranczy, 2014
- Ochthephilus szeli Makranczy, 2014
- Ochthephilus tatricus (Smetana, 1967)
- Ochthephilus tibetanus Makranczy, 2014
- Ochthephilus tichomirovae Makranczy, 2014
- Ochthephilus uhligi Makranczy, 2014
- Ochthephilus venustulus (Rosenhauer, 1856)
- Ochthephilus wrasei Makranczy, 2014
- Ochthephilus wunderlei Makranczy, 2014
- Ochthephilus zerchei Makranczy, 2014
