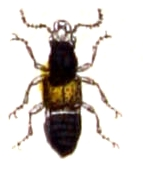
- Platystethus arenarius

Scientific classification
- Domain: Eukaryota
- Kingdom: Animalia
- Phylum: Arthropoda
- Class: Insecta
- Order: Coleoptera
- Suborder: Polyphaga
- Infraorder: Staphyliniformia
- Family: Staphylinidae
- Tribe: Oxytelini
- Genus: Platystethus; Mannerheim, 1830

= Platystethus =

Genus of beetles

Platystethus is a genus of spiny-legged rove beetles in the family Staphylinidae. There are about 6 described species in Platystethus.

== Species ==
- Platystethus americanus Erichson, 1840
- Platystethus archetypus Scudder, 1900
- Platystethus arenarius (Geoffroy, 1785)
- Platystethus carcareus Scudder, 1900
- Platystethus degener Mulsant & Rey, 1878
- Platystethus spiculus Erichson, 1840
