= Mitosynum =

Scientific classification
- Domain: Eukaryota
- Kingdom: Animalia
- Phylum: Arthropoda
- Class: Insecta
- Order: Coleoptera
- Suborder: Polyphaga
- Infraorder: Staphyliniformia
- Family: Staphylinidae
- Tribe: Euphaniini
- Genus: Mitosynum; Campbell, 1982

Genus of beetles

Mitosynum is a genus of spiny-legged rove beetles in the family Staphylinidae. There is one described species in Mitosynum, M. vockerothi.
