= Thinodromus =

Scientific classification
- Domain: Eukaryota
- Kingdom: Animalia
- Phylum: Arthropoda
- Class: Insecta
- Order: Coleoptera
- Suborder: Polyphaga
- Infraorder: Staphyliniformia
- Family: Staphylinidae
- Genus: Thinodromus

Genus of beetles

Thinodromus is a genus of beetles belonging to the family Staphylinidae.

The genus has cosmopolitan distribution.

Species:

- Thinodromus abnormalis (Cameron, 1930)
- Thinodromus acuticollis (Bernhauer, 1927)
