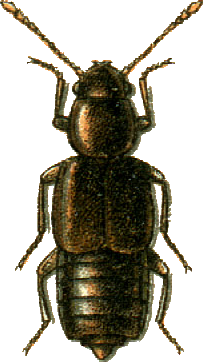
- Thinobius longipennis

Scientific classification
- Domain: Eukaryota
- Kingdom: Animalia
- Phylum: Arthropoda
- Class: Insecta
- Order: Coleoptera
- Suborder: Polyphaga
- Infraorder: Staphyliniformia
- Family: Staphylinidae
- Genus: Thinobius; Kiesenwetter, 1844

= Thinobius =

Genus of beetles

Thinobius is a genus of beetles belonging to the family Staphylinidae.

The genus has almost cosmopolitan distribution.

Species:

- Thinobius afer Peyerimhoff, 1914
- Thinobius agilis Sharp, 1887
