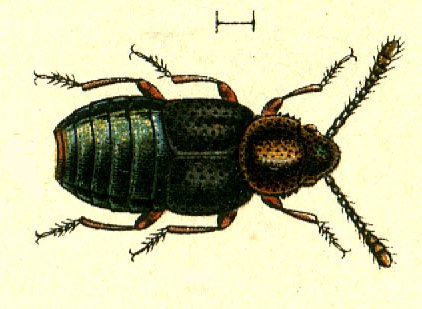
- Syntomium aeneum

Scientific classification
- Kingdom: Animalia
- Phylum: Arthropoda
- Class: Insecta
- Order: Coleoptera
- Suborder: Polyphaga
- Infraorder: Staphyliniformia
- Family: Staphylinidae
- Genus: Syntomium; Curtis, 1828

= Syntomium =

Genus of beetles

Syntomium is a genus of beetles belonging to the family Staphylinidae.

The species of this genus are found in Europe and North America.

Species:

- Syntomium aeneum (Müller, 1821)
- Syntomium caucasicum Khachikov & Bibin, 2016
