= Deleaster =

Scientific classification
- Kingdom: Animalia
- Phylum: Arthropoda
- Class: Insecta
- Order: Coleoptera
- Suborder: Polyphaga
- Infraorder: Staphyliniformia
- Family: Staphylinidae
- Genus: Deleaster; Erichson, 1939

Genus of beetles

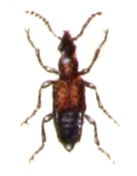
Deleaster dichrous

Deleaster is a genus of beetles belonging to the family Staphylinidae.

The species of this genus are found in Europe, Asia, Oceania, Africa and North America.

Species:

- Deleaster dichrous (Gravenhorst, 1802)
- Deleaster gibbus Cuccodoro & Makranczy, 2013
- Deleaster obscuricollis Coiffait, 1979
- Deleaster pectinatus Fauvel, 1882
- Deleaster negus Cuccodoro & Makranczy, 2013
- Deleaster taiwanensis Hayashi, 1984
- Deleaster wilhelmensis
