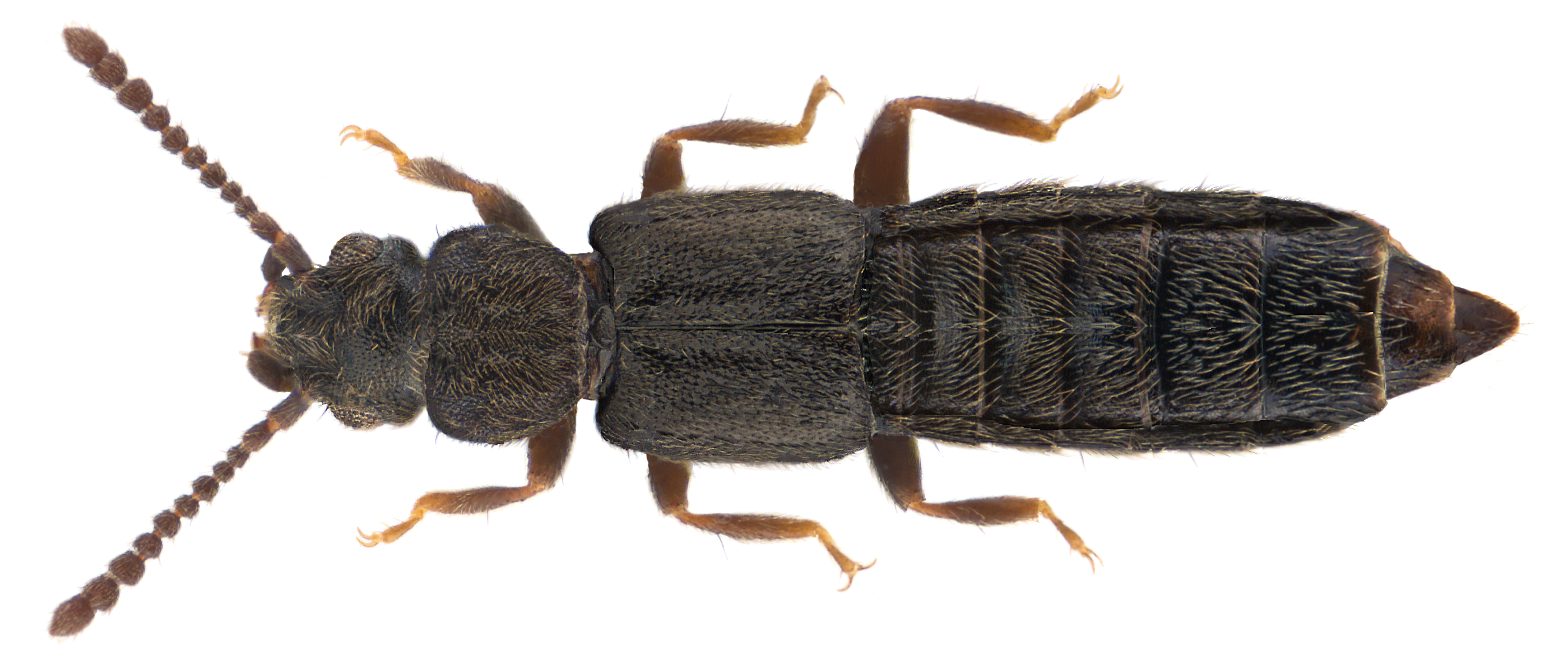
- Family: Staphylinidae Size: 2,2 mm (2,0 to 2,3 mm) Origin: Europe Ecology: on banks, in moist habitats Location: Germany, Bavaria, Upper Franconia, Selbitz leg.det. U.Schmidt, 25.V.2001

Scientific classification
- Kingdom: Animalia
- Phylum: Arthropoda
- Class: Insecta
- Order: Coleoptera
- Suborder: Polyphaga
- Infraorder: Staphyliniformia
- Family: Staphylinidae
- Subfamily: Oxytelinae
- Tribe: Thinobiini
- Genus: Carpelimus; Leach, 1819

= Carpelimus =

Genus of beetles

Carpelimus is a genus of spiny-legged rove beetles in the family Staphylinidae. There are at least 100 described species in Carpelimus.

== See also ==
- List of Carpelimus species
