= Blister beetle dermatitis =

- Specialty: Dermatology

Blister beetle dermatitis is a cutaneous condition that occurs after contact with any of several types of beetles, including those from the Meloidae and Oedemeridae families. Blister beetles secrete an irritant called cantharidin, a vesicant that can get onto humans if they touch the beetles.

The term "blister beetle dermatitis" is also occasionally and inappropriately used as a synonym for Paederus dermatitis, a somewhat different dermatitis caused by contact with pederin, an irritant in the hemolymph of a different group of beetles, the rove beetles.

== Symptoms and signs ==
After skin comes in contact with cantharidin, local irritation begins within a few hours. (This is in contrast to Paederus dermatitis, where symptoms first appear 12–36 hours after contact with rove beetles.) Painful blisters appear, but scarring from these epidermal lesions is rare.

== See also ==
- List of cutaneous conditions
- Skin lesion
