= Paederus dermatitis =

- Other names: Linear dermatitis or Dermatitis linearis
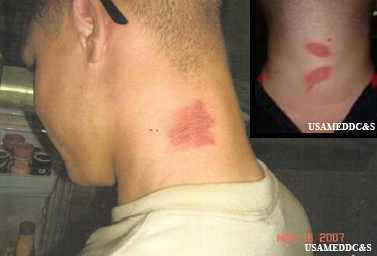
- Paederus dermatitis

Paederus dermatitis, medically known as dermatitis linearis, is a skin irritation resulting from contact with the hemolymph of certain rove beetles, a group that belongs to the insect order Coleoptera and the genus Paederus. Other local names given to Paederus dermatitis include spider-lick, whiplash dermatitis, and Nairobi fly dermatitis.

Rove beetles do not bite or sting, but a very small number of species can cause skin irritations and blisters when accidentally brushed or crushed against the skin, which causes them to release their coelemic fluid containing a strong blistering chemical. The active agent in the coelemic fluid is commonly referred to as pederin, although depending on the beetle species it may be one of several similar molecules, including pederone and pseudopederin.

"Blister beetle dermatitis", a term more properly used for the different dermatitis caused by cantharidin from blister beetles, is also sometimes used to describe paederus dermatitis caused by rove beetles.

== Diagnosis and treatment ==
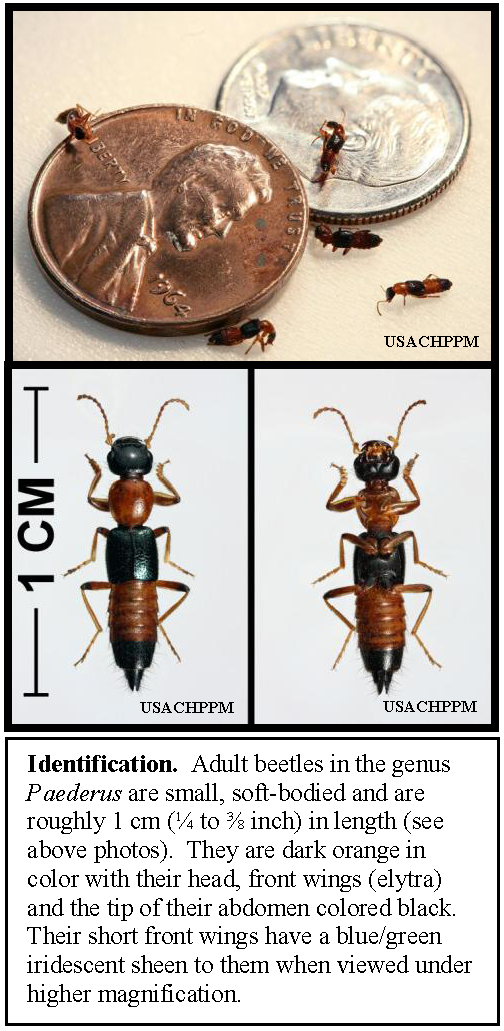
Paederus rove beetles, showing size

Once pederin is on the skin from the initial beetle contact, it may also be spread elsewhere on the skin. "Kissing" or "mirror-image" lesions where two skin areas come in contact (for example, the elbow flexure) are often seen. Washing the hands and skin with soap and water is strongly recommended, if contact with a rove beetle has occurred.

Initial skin contact with pederin shows no immediate result. Within 12–36 hours, however, a reddish rash (erythema) appears, which develops into blisters. Irritation, including crusting and scaling, may last from two to three weeks. The pederin may unconsciously be transmitted to other parts of the body such as the eye and genitals after the initial contact. Conjunctivitis which is commonly known as Nairobi eye in eastern Africa occurs when the eyes are affected.

One study reported best results with a treatment regimen that combined topical steroids with oral antihistamines (first day) and antibiotics. The authors hypothesized that antibiotics were helpful because of the possible contamination of skin by pederin-producing bacteria.

Research from a group at the University of Hyderabad in 2024 suggest that the use of LED lights at night may be a solution to prevent acid fly attacks. The study however warns that there may be other unknown factors that may still attract the flies into living areas.

== Location and species ==
Three different genera of rove beetles, all members of the same subtribe Paederina, can cause paederus dermatitis: Paederus, Paederidus, and Megalopaederus. This irritant is called pederin and is highly toxic, more potent than cobra venom.

In different parts of the world, different species of rove beetle cause Paederus dermatitis:

- Paederus melampus, also known as the Manipal bug or Nitte Police, occurs in the Indian state of Karnataka. (Manipal is the name of a university town.) In a 2007 article titled 'Paederus Dermatitis', two dermatologists from Sri Devaraj Medical College in Karnataka identified the Manipal bug as Paederus melampus. They are also sometimes called "blister beetle", although rove beetles such as P. melampus are in a different family (Staphylinidae) than the blister beetle family Meloidae.
- Paederus brasilensis, also called "El podo," causes dermatitis in South America. There is also a Venezuelan species, Paederus columbinus.
- Paederus fuscipes is probably the major agent that causes linear dermatitis in northern Iran. Whereas this disease is a rural difficulty in the south, mainly in villages or small towns, it is an urban problem in northern provinces along the Caspian Sea shore.
- Paederus australis is responsible for outbreaks of dermatitis in Queensland and the Northern Territory, and Paederus cruenticollis for outbreaks in southern New South Wales.
- Nairobi fly: Paederus crebrepunctatus and Paederus sabaeus both cause dermatitis in Central and East Africa.

Paederus dermatitis has also been reported from Nigeria, France, Okinawa, Australia, Malaysia, Indonesia, Thailand, Singapore, Taiwan, Vietnam, India (Perumbavoor, Kerala), Sierra Leone, Sri Lanka and Ethiopia .

== See also ==
- Amebiasis cutis
- Anotylus tetracarinatus, a related beetle that causes severe pain when caught in the eye
- Blister beetle dermatitis
- List of cutaneous conditions
- Carpet beetle
