= Albury–Wodonga =

Metropolitan area in Australia

Coordinates: 36.08422°S 146.90974°E

- Metropolitan area
- Map of Australia with Albury–Wodonga labelled
- Country: Australia
- States: New South Wales; Victoria

Area
  - Urban: 628.3 km^{2} (242.6 sq mi)
- Highest elevation: 165 m (541 ft)

Population (2021)
  - Density: 161.3/km^{2} (418/sq mi)
  - Urban: 101,370 (20th)
- Time zone: UTC+10:00 (AEST)
  - Summer (DST): UTC+11:00 (AEDT)

Albury–Wodonga (/ˈɔːlbəri wəˈdɒŋɡə/ ALL-bree wə-DONG-gə) is the broad settlement incorporating the twin Australian cities of Albury and Wodonga, which are separated geographically by the Murray River and politically by a state border: Albury on the north of the river is part of New South Wales, while Wodonga on the south bank is in Victoria.

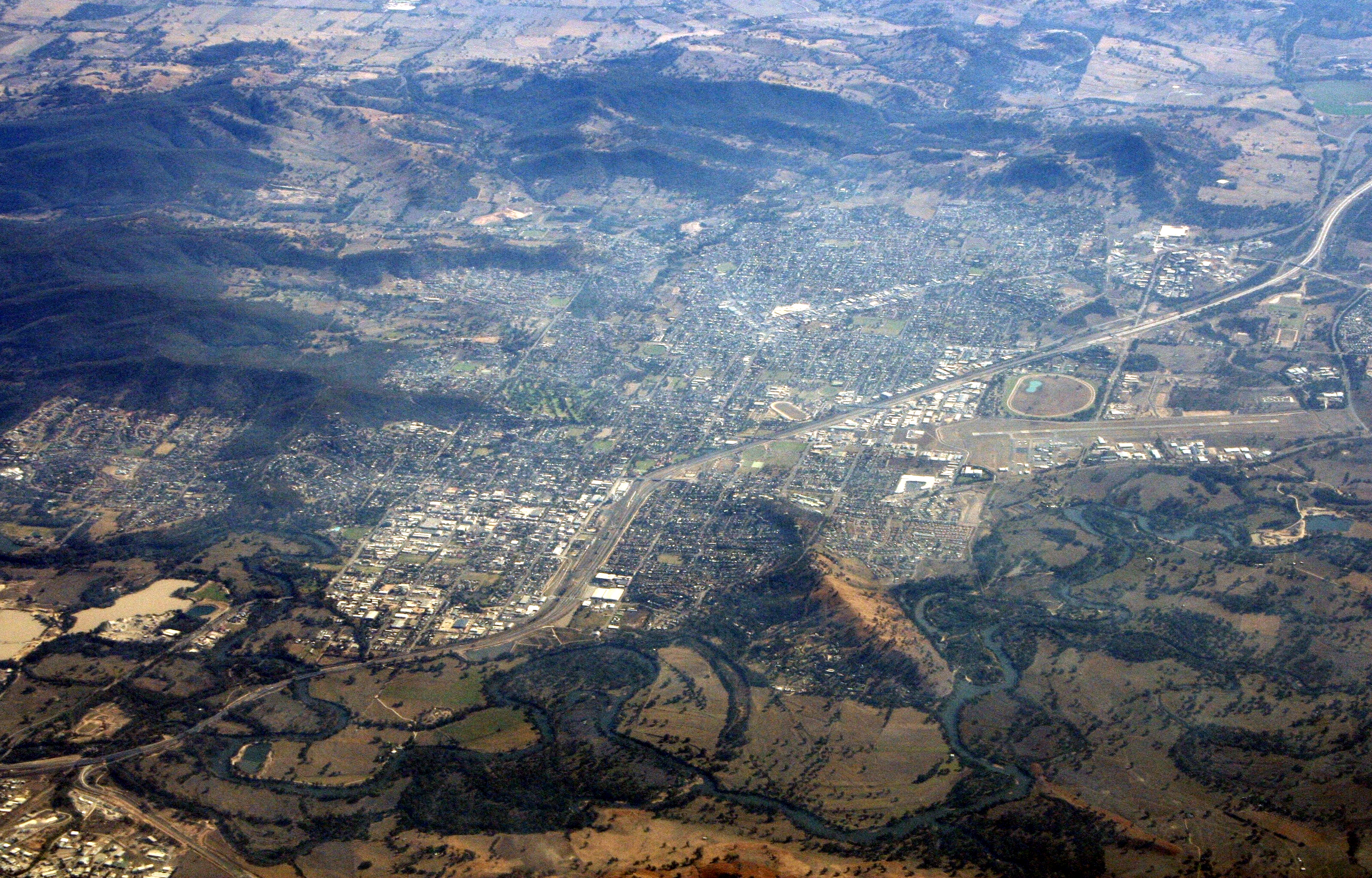
Aerial view of Albury

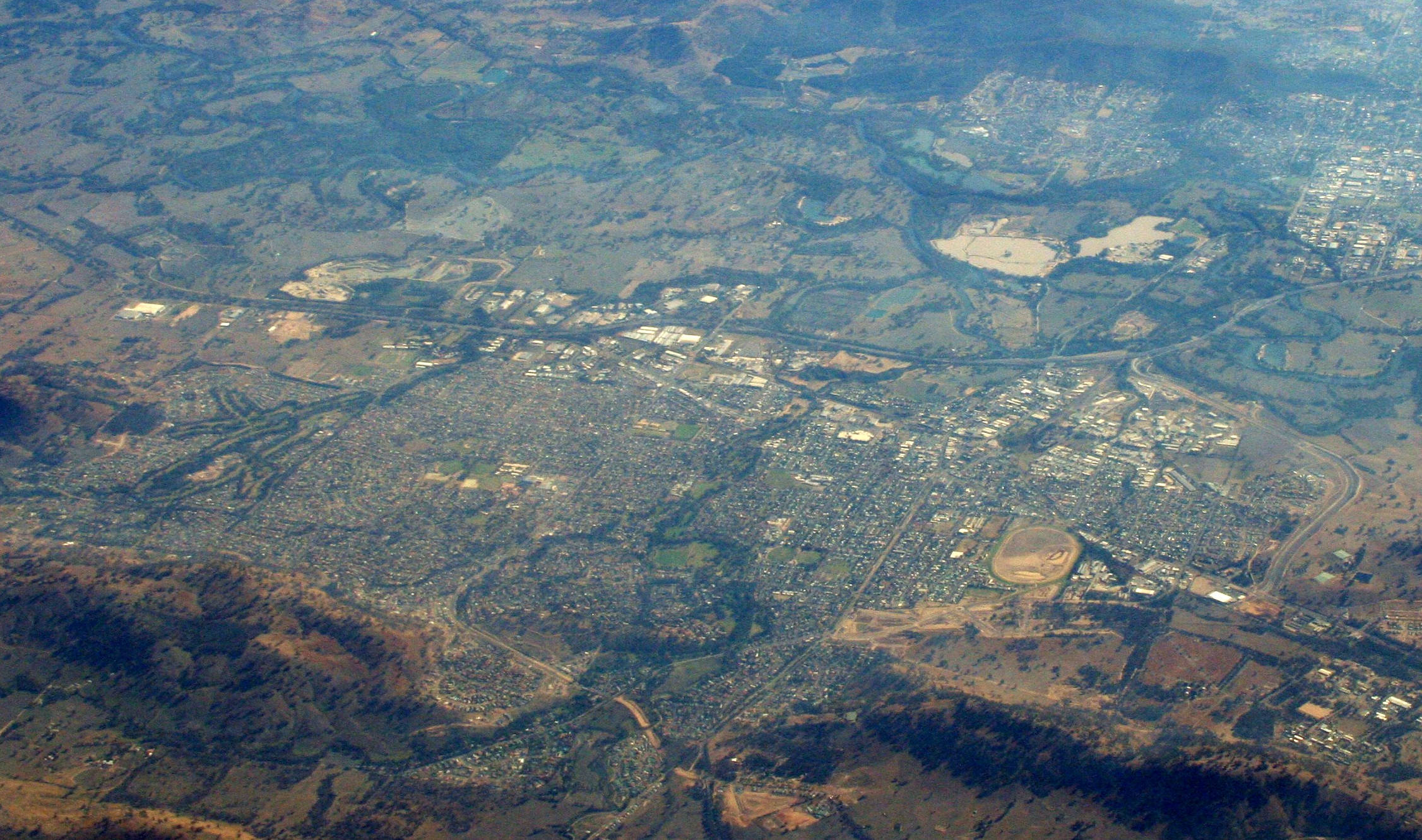
Aerial view of Wodonga, to the left of the stream of water

In the early 1970s, Albury–Wodonga was selected as the primary focus of the federal Whitlam government's scheme to arrest the uncontrolled growth of Australia's large metropolitan areas (in particular Sydney and Melbourne) by encouraging decentralisation. The National Urban Growth Centres initiative, which was Australia’s closest attempt to replicate the 'New Towns' strategy of post-war European models, had grand plans to turn Albury–Wodonga into a major inland city. Albury–Wodonga, it was said, was 'central to the most ambitious plan for deliberate Commonwealth government intervention in regional development since the founding of Canberra as the National Capital'.

Embarking on what was deemed 'an exciting adventure', the Albury–Wodonga pilot scheme involved three governments—the Commonwealth, NSW and Victoria. On 25 January 1973 the Premier of New South Wales, Sir Robert Askin, the Premier of Victoria, Rupert Hamer and the Prime Minister, Gough Whitlam signed the initial agreement for the accelerated development of Albury–Wodonga. According to some, it was a unique cross-border agreement that illustrated a 'spirit of cooperative federalism'.

Under Whitlam’s newly established Department of Urban and Regional Development (DURD), the ambition to decentralise Australia and promote new growth centres was further demonstrated in the budget allocations of 1973/74 and 1974/75—a provision of $33 million and $223 million for urban growth centres consecutively. In 1973/74, $9 million of the $33 million was allocated to the urban growth centre of Albury–Wodonga. The remaining $24 million was distributed between six other nominated growth centres.

However, due to the subsequent Fraser government's repudiation of Labor's decentralisation policies, the plan to populate inland areas and cities other than the state capitals was abandoned. No other Commonwealth government since, either Coalition or Labor, has made any attempt at repopulating inland areas. Thus the current Albury–Wodonga population is far below the 300,000 projected by Gough Whitlam in the 1970s.

The population increased by 1.1% per year on average from 81,540 in 2008 to 86,274 in 2013. It increased further to 89,007 by the 2016 census, giving an average annual growth rate of 1.04%.

In the 2021 census, Albury–Wodonga had a population of 97,793. As of 2023, the Albury–Wodonga website describes it as having a combined population around 100,000 residents and being Australia's 20th largest city. The website Invest Albury Wodonga claims that the city has reached a population milestone and sustainable population tipping point by having 250,000 people within 100km of Albury–Wodonga.

== Albury–Wodonga's National Growth Centre Experience ==
Albury–Wodonga’s national growth centre experience derived from Australia’s decentralisation processes in the post-war era. Australia, at the time was seen to be borrowing the idea from British town and country planning which had developed from the Garden City concept. The 'New Towns' approach, as it was known, was a popular form of planning used in 1940–50’s UK to aid national decentralisation. The main features of the concept were the strengthening of neighbourhoods and civic centres, development of industrial zones and greenbelts. Meanwhile, in Australia, some began to term the new development as 'satellite towns' and emphasised the improved conditions around housing, more open spaces and easier access to the countryside. Soon after, elements of the 'new towns' could be found in metropolitan planning strategies in Australian cities such as Canberra and Elizabeth.

By the 1970s the concept was adopted by the Whitlam government who took up the idea as a national urban development policy, and nominated a range of cities to be affected, some pre-existing (Albury–Wodonga, Bathurst-Orange), and others to be developed (Monarto). Both the Commonwealth and State governments were involved in the strategies to accelerate the growth of Albury–Wodonga. Together they established the Albury–Wodonga Development Corporation which held mandates for local land development, economic and community planning and reafforestation and for the overall implementation of the project.

=== Strategies for relocation ===
From a Commonwealth perspective there was a desire to relocate public servants from larger cities such as Canberra and Sydney to Albury–Wodonga due to concerns around rising costs in highly populated urban areas. Further support came from the AWDC who, in turn, offered high standard rental housing and support for key transferred public servants and developed an innovative newcomer program to help those transferred and their families. Despite these efforts, a high-level of public service relocation did not take place. However, Albury–Wodonga was, successful in establishing an Australia Tax Office bureau and today still has a large number of defence jobs as a result of a major logistics centre development and training school set up by the federal government.

Universities and corporate decentralisation were also seen as a way to grow a prosperous urban area. The establishment of a university would not only increase the number of jobs but also expand the occupational breadth in the workforce. A university would provide access to tertiary education for rural and regional students and limit the loss of local school leavers from the region.

Similarly, attracting private enterprise was used as a mechanism to accelerate growth. Thus the AWDC developed an economic strategy focussed on the strengthening of distribution and manufacturing services in the region. Albury–Wodonga was to become a regional distribution hub. Moreover, the AWDC enticed new businesses to relocate by providing rental start-up factories, rental housing for employees and promoting the child-care and education facilities already available. To attract larger private enterprises (for example Mars Petcare and the Newsprint Mill at Ettamogah) the state and Commonwealth governments intervened, enforcing provisions such a social housing for employees, to help accelerate growth.

Furthermore, similar to other places that fell under the 'New Towns' strategy, retaining green space was important for the Albury–Wodonga growth centre. In and around the area, the AWDC planted approximately 3 million trees and shrubs, becoming one of Australia’s biggest urban re-afforestation programs. Today Albury–Wodonga continues to exercise environmental leadership through various sustainability initiatives.

== See also ==
- Christmas Eye, a seasonal epidemic of corneal ulceration which predominantly occurs only within a particular region of Australia
