= Psymberin =

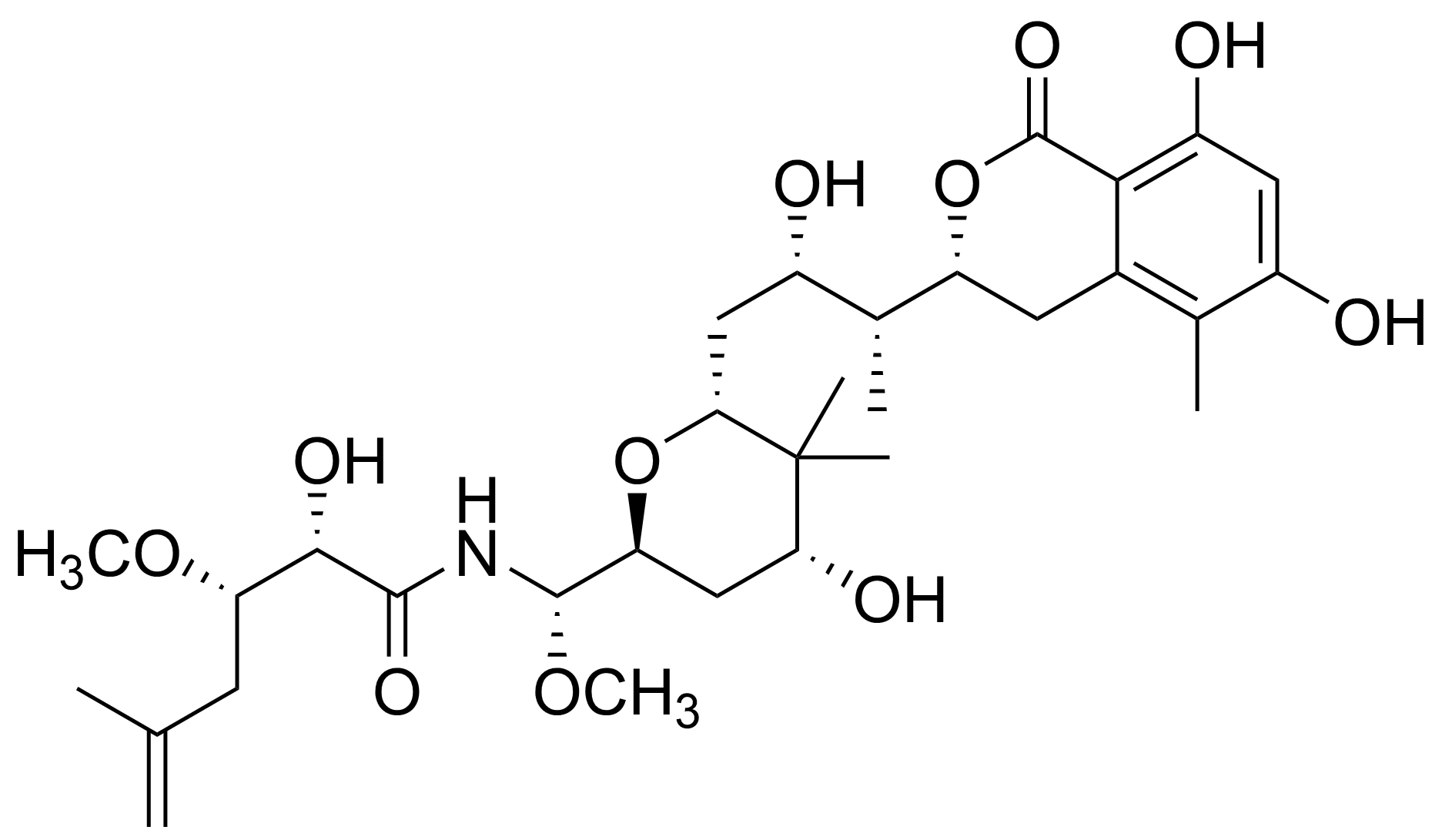

Names
- IUPAC name (2S,3S)-N-((S)-((2S,4R,6R)-6-((2S,3R)-3-((R)-6,8-dihydroxy-5-methyl-1-oxoisochroman-3-yl)-2-hydroxybutyl)-4-hydroxy-5,5-dimethyltetrahydro-2H-pyran-2-yl)(methoxy)methyl)-2-hydroxy-3-methoxy-5-methylhex-5-enamide
- Other names irciniastatin A

Identifiers
CAS Number	714954-37-7
3D model (JSmol)	Interactive image
ChEMBL	ChEMBL374598
ChemSpider	24604808
PubChem CID	11692946
UNII	SAK6W44ZUP
- InChI: InChI=1S/C31H47NO11/c1-14(2)9-22(40-7)27(37)28(38)32-29(41-8)23-13-24(36)31(5,6)25(42-23)12-19(34)16(4)21-10-17-15(3)18(33)11-20(35)26(17)30(39)43-21/h11,16,19,21-25,27,29,33-37H,1,9-10,12-13H2,2-8H3,(H,32,38)/t16-,19+,21-,22+,23+,24-,25-,27+,29+/m1/s1 Key: BNNIEBYABSNREN-CYRUSRGFSA-N
- SMILES: O[C@@H](C[C@H]1O[C@H]([C@H](OC)NC([C@@H](O)[C@H](CC(C)=C)OC)=O)C[C@@H](O)C1(C)C)[C@@H](C)[C@@H](CC2=C(C)C(O)=CC(O)=C23)OC3=O

Properties
Chemical formula	C_{31}H_{47}NO_{11}
Molar mass	609.71 g/mol
Appearance	clear, glasslike solid
- Except where otherwise noted, data are given for materials in their standard state (at 25 °C [77 °F], 100 kPa). Infobox references

Psymberin, also known as irciniastatin A, is a cytotoxin derived from sea sponges. It was discovered by two independent research groups, one led by Dr. Phil Crews and one led by Dr. Jean Schmidt, in 2004. Psymberin was found to be highly bioactive as it showed LC50s at nanomolar concentrations against various types of tumors.

== Biosynthesis ==
The biosynthesis of psymberin became of interest when it was found to have a very similar structure to pederin, a natural product derived from the beetle genus Paederus. This led researchers to investigate the genes of the organism that code for the respective natural product. A trans-AT polyketide synthase cluster, designated as the Psy cluster, contained two large groups of genes coding for two PKSs. The smaller gene group, psyA, encoded a PKS with three modules, while the larger psyD encoded a ten module PKS. This ten module PsyD protein is, to date, the protein with the highest reported number of PKS modules. Large portions of the gene cluster psyD have very close counterparts in the pederin gene clusters. This indicates that psymberin and pederin are both structurally and biosynthetically related. The figure below shows the proposed biosynthesis of psymberin based on analysis of the gene clusters. Roman numerals represent which clade each Ketosynthase domain belongs. The domains outlined in red represent carrier proteins. The following abbreviations correspond to the figure below: GNAT, GCN5-related N-acetyltransferase; CR, crotonase; KR, ketoreductase; KS^{0}, non-elongating ketoreductase; OMT, O-methyltranfserase; C, nonribosomal peptide synthetase (NRPS) condensation domain; A, NRPS adenylation domain; MT, Methyltransferase; DH, deydratase; TE, Thioesterase; ?, unknown.

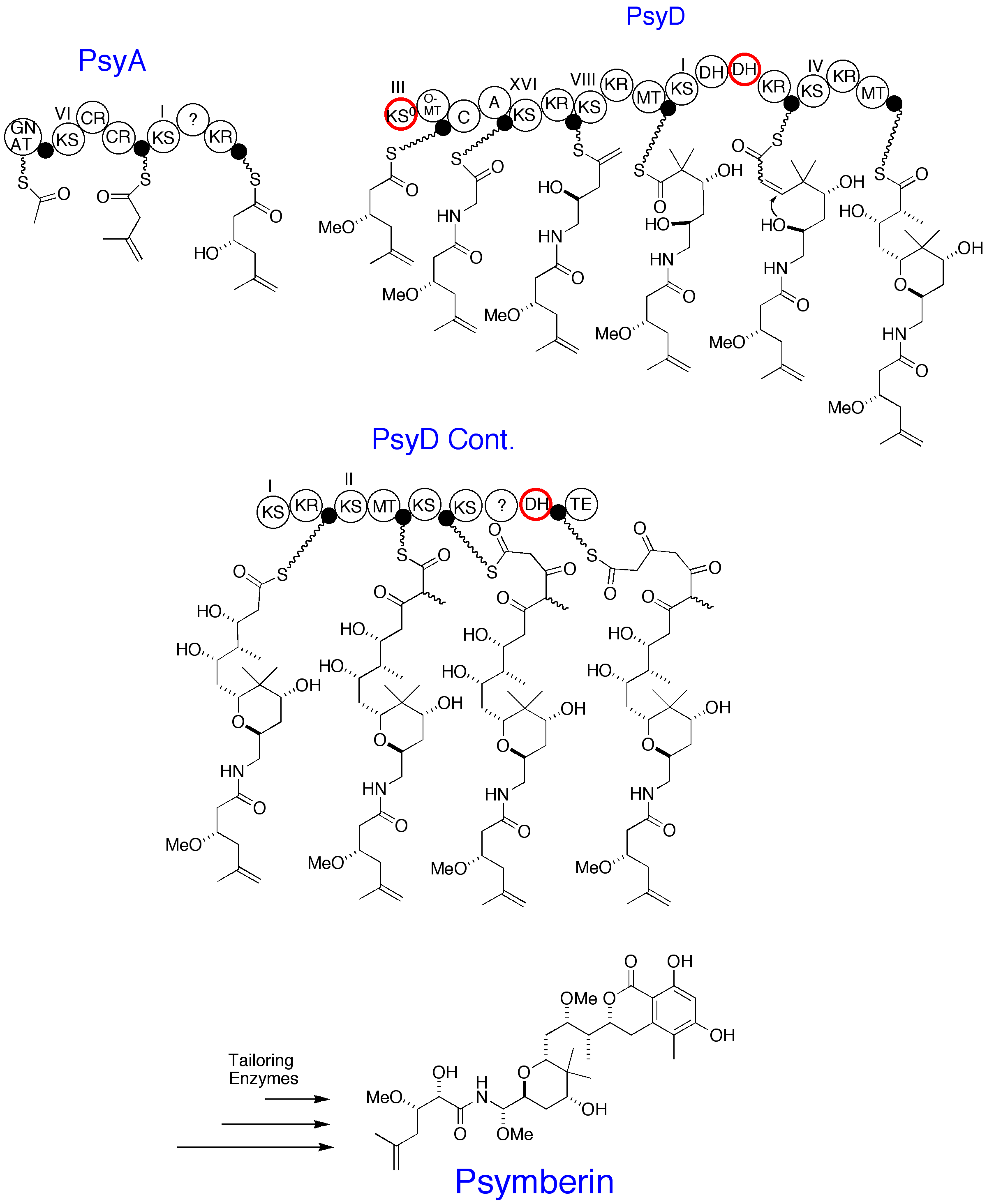

== See also ==
- Pederin
