= Christmas eye =

Corneal ulceration

Christmas Eye (also known as seasonal corneal ulcer, Albury-Wodonga syndrome, harvester's eye, or harvester's keratitis) refers to a seasonal epidemic of corneal ulceration which predominantly occurs in a particular region of Australia, caused by chemicals released upon death by small native beetles in the area.

This seasonal epidemic was first identified in the 1970s and for a long time it has remained poorly understood. The condition commonly occurs around Christmas time, hence its name, in the south-west region of New South Wales and north-east Victoria. Christmas Eye is monocular, meaning that the infection only occurs in one eye and it is known to be extremely painful. Many patients are actually awakened in the early hours of the morning due to major pain. This condition is known to be terrible, such that patients have indicated that the pain is torturous and on par with giving birth. It is more tormenting for children, who often cannot communicate the severity of the pain that they are experiencing.

Regardless of the extreme pain that comes with contracting Christmas Eye, the treatment and management of this condition is fairly straightforward. Once the condition is healed there have been no signs of ongoing damage.

== Signs and symptoms ==
When a person is diagnosed with Christmas Eye they undergo minimal symptoms, but they are highly severe. An individual with Christmas Eye experiences extreme eye pain, a swollen and watery eye and itchy and burning lesions on the cornea. The pain level most commonly ranges to a score of 8 or 9 out of 10, but during the early stages it could be less depending on the degree of corneal disruptions. Apart from direct eye symptoms, an individual could also experience excessive lacrimation, photosensitivity, headaches and nausea.

When it comes to clinical signs, the eye demonstrates a corneal epithelium disturbance that progresses to an extensive epithelial loss that ranges up to 90% of the cornea. It could also show corneal oedema which leads to thickening the corneal by up to 30%. Extensive conjunctival injection, which is an enlargement of conjunctival vessels, and conjunctival chemosis, which is the swelling of the tissues that lines the eyelids and surface of the eye. There is also a mild reaction to the anterior chamber of the eye and there can be decreased vision.

== Causes ==
For years, the cause of the condition was a mystery due to lack of physical evidence. Through ongoing research, it was revealed that the condition was caused by small native beetles of the genus Orthoperus. Circumstantial evidence suggests that beetles in the genus Paederus (Staphylinidae) and other beetles in the genus Orthoperus (Corylophidae) carry the compound pederin in their hemolymph, which is a mixture of blood and interstitial fluid. When this chemical is released, from the crushing of the insect in the eye, it causes painful, but temporary eye lesions. They can also cause severe dermatitis and the so-called 'whiplash' stripe across the skin. Since Pederin is a strong inhibitor of protein biosynthesis and it is a blistering agent, it is not surprising that it causes a major effect on the corneal epithelium.

== Pathophysiology ==
In Christmas Eye, the ulceration may be punctate, which will lead to forming one large ulcer that involves most of the cornea but it often spares the periphery. When the beetle enters the eye and it is crushed, the released chemical, pederin, will cause an autocatalytic reaction which will result in corneal epithelial cell death and ulceration after only a few hours. On a molecular level, pederin will inhibit mitosis by disrupting DNA and protein synthesis. Overall it will induce an acute, necrotic reaction. It could be possible that the eye movements or rubbing during a person's sleep can lead to precipitating the situation.

== Diagnosis ==
Before confirming the diagnosis, it is important to keep in mind that there are similar conditions that demonstrate similar signs and symptoms, such as herpes keratitis, corneal abrasion and infectious corneal ulcer. In order to diagnosis Christmas Eye, it is essential to take a look at the history, meaning what the patient was doing prior to attending the emergency room or a day before. Also, particular attention should be placed on the timeline of the pain and discomfort. Biomicroscopy will show the extent of corneal damage and amount of remaining epithelium present, which will assist in providing a confirmation of the diagnosis.An essential factor is considering the time of year, since Christmas Eye generally occurs only between late October and early March. In addition, the higher the pain level, the more likely the Christmas Eye presentation. Patients with this condition generally arrive at the hospital with severe pain, in which their hand does not leave the affected eye due to the amount of pain. The time frame of the pain is usually instantaneous, which causes an individual to wake up in the early hours of the morning with increasing eye pain. This pain only continues to increase, regardless of the person's best attempt to reduce the aggravation.

In addition, there is a stain with fluorescein that demonstrates a bright green splash in the cornea. The epithelium in the surrounding area of the infected eye is often disrupted and it demonstrates a considerable amount lost. In the very early stages, the desquamation starts off patchy and then progresses to covering up to 80% of the corneal surface. There is no iritis, corneal stroma or breech of Bowman's layer. The ulceration can be accompanied by conjunctivitis, without mucus or pus, in addition to oedema of the lids. Lastly, there is no regional lymphadenopathy and the second eye is not affected.

== Prevention ==
It is known that Christmas Eye is a seasonal condition. This means that to prevent exposure to this toxin, individuals in Australia should be extremely cautious during the summer, specifically if they will be doing outside activities like gardening, mowing, etc.

== Treatment ==
Once Christmas Eye has been diagnosed, the treatment is simple. Keep in mind that the corneal epithelium does heal rapidly, so once the epithelium begins to recover, the pain levels start to diminish. With this in mind, the first approach for treatment would be to control and reduce the pain. To begin, the patient would be given topical anesthesia to reduce the pain. Once the pain is slightly reduced, there should be a documented photo of the epithelial loss and corneal thickness. These specific results will be further used during check-ups. When the results are obtained, there will be a bandage of silicone hydrogel contact lens inserted on the infected eye. The patient will be prescribed chloramphenicol eye drops, which they will apply four times a day. The eye drops will be essential in treating the bacterial infection and preventing further growth. The patient will also take oral non-steroidal anti-inflammatory medication, for example, Nurofen or Voltaren.

Once the patient leaves the hospital, they will need to return every two to three days for review until the corneal epithelium is healed. Once it is healed, the bandage will be removed and the patient will start using AFT Hylo Forte eye drops daily for two weeks. This treatment will reduce severe dryness in the eye. After two weeks, the patient should return for a final review.

== Prognosis ==
Christmas Eye is not contagious. The majority of patients who get this condition heal perfectly without any ongoing effects, such as not having any visual loss and the ulcers healing without any scarring. The pain lasts until the epithelium is regenerated, which is in about 48 hours. The vision regeneration may take days or rarely weeks. Patients generally get back to normal once their vision is fully repaired and there are no leftover signs of the corneal ulcer.

== Epidemiology ==
Early research suggests that people are more frequently affected during the summer period (mid-December to mid-January) in south-west New South Wales and north-east Victoria than people elsewhere in Australia. Patients often describe being near a body of water the previous evening, and the first cases usually occur when the daytime temperature approaches 30°C - typically late November. The condition appears to be geographically limited. As far as it can be determined, the syndrome has not occurred in large numbers outside the south-west slopes and the plains of New South Wales. Statistically however, the majority of cases occur in the north-east of Victoria. The severity of Christmas Eye continues to vary from year to year, which leads to improving the treatment and management of this painful condition.

== Research ==
There is currently no new research on Christmas Eye, but there have been many new cases of Christmas Eye which were largely seen in 2008. In December of 2019, Robert Holloway (BScOptom) revisited the condition of Christmas Eye in the publication of Optometry Australia. He indicated that he had encountered three cases where there had been a localized area of stromal thinning. The corneal response to the treatment appears to be as expected until the four-day mark, where the corneal inflammation and oedema seem to remain. As the inflammation is reduced, the stroma appears to be thin, and the corneal topography changes to show an area of depression. Due to this leads to a vision disruption.

In addition to this, he also came across another patient who experienced the development of a disc-shaped intrastromal corneal scar. During the five-day mark he developed a disc-shaped sub-epithelial lesion with marked corneal thickening. Over the next six months the cornea involved proceeded to flatten and thin. The density of the corneal scarring also decreased. A year later, the lesion was still present but much less dense and the corneal thickness had stabilized. Regardless of this, the lesion did cause slight blur and mild flare at night while driving.

== See also ==
- Corneal ulcer
