= Phillip Crews =

African American chemist

- Born: August 15, 1943 (age 82); Urbana, Illinois, U.S.
- Occupation: Chemist
- Years active: 1969–present
- Spouse: Peggy Crews

Phillip Crews (born August 15, 1943) is an African American chemist at UCSC. His research work is around marine natural products chemistry and diversity education in chemistry. He was elected a Fellow of the American Association for the Advancement of Science in 2008.

== Early life ==
Crews was born in Champaign-Urbana, Illinois and lived in Chicago until the family moved to Palo Alto in the 1950s. Crews attended Wilbur Junior High School and then Cubberley High School. He next attended UCLA, where he received a BS in chemistry and wrote the senior thesis: “Coupling constant mechanisms in ^{1}H NMR”. He then received a PhD in chemistry at UCSB under Dominic J. Bertelli with a thesis titled “Chemistry of non-benzenoid aromatics”. Crews then wrote and was awarded an NSF postdoctoral fellowship to investigate the stereochemistry of organo-metalloids at Princeton University with the late Kurt Mislow.

== Research ==
In 1970, Crews obtained a position in the chemistry department at UCSC, where he began his research career investigating physical organic chemistry. In 1973 he shifted his research program towards the nascent area of marine natural products chemistry as an untenured assistant professor.

Crews uses bioassay-guided isolation to discover natural products that may help treat or cure human diseases, incorporating elements of structure elucidation and employing state-of-the-art nuclear magnetic resonance (NMR) techniques. He became especially interested in the molecular structures of the psymberins and the bengamides, molecules isolated from Indo-Pacific sponges. Psymberin is one of his most important discoveries because of its potential for further development to treat solid tumor cancers. The mixed NRPS-PKS biosynthetic product comes from the marine sponge Psammocinia aff. Bulbosa. Crews research on psymberin has stimulated almost 100 studies and publications by other laboratories. Another molecule of importance is bengamide B, that led to an anti-cancer Phase I clinical trial on a close analog. In addition to these two molecules, Crews has discovered many small molecule tools derived from marine sponges, some of which are used worldwide by research teams as molecular probes. These small molecules include the actin inhibitors, jasplakinolide and latrunculin, the Mitochondrial Complex I inhibitor, mycothiazole, the human methionine aminopeptidase inhibitor, and fascaplysins, an opioid receptor agonist. He is also a holder of a patent for oxazole anthelmintic agents of marine origin. Crews led and co-authored of the widely-used textbook, “Organic Structure Analysis”., along with Marcel Jaspars and Jaime Rodriguez. The first edition was published by Oxford University Press in 1998 and with the second edition being published in 2009. Crews' goal was to highlight the intense complexity of spectroscopic analysis of natural products, from which the “Crews rule” emerged. The “Crews rule” states that if a molecule’s ratio of hydrogens to carbons is less than 1, then additional measures should be performed to confirm the structure.

In 1990 he became the principal investigator in the National Cooperative Drug Discovery Group (NCDDG) program., a position he held for 20 years. In 2017, he was honored with a special issue of the Journal of Natural Products.

== Diversity and outreach ==
Crews has participated and led in numerous outreach programs, including running the NIH-supported ACCESS program for the past 27 years. This program helps first-generation and under-represented students from 2-year community colleges transition to 4-year university by giving them access to cutting edge research and building their confidence to continue in careers in science. His dedication to diversity and inclusion was recognized with UCSC's 2004 Excellence through Diversity Award. He also gave the UCSC Spring 2019 Emeriti Lecture on “Inspirational Biomolecules from Oceania.” In 2021, the UCSC chemistry department established the Phillip Crews symposium, "Powered by Chemistry, Strengthened by Diversity" and student fellowship.

== Winery ==
In Crews’ early days in academia, Crews wanted to add a new dimension to chemical education at UCSC by contributing to the general education curriculum. He therefore launched of a new course, “Chemistry of wine - Introductory lecture-laboratory course for non-chemistry students” as well as other lectures such as Wines & winemaking Merging Chemistry Fundamentals and Sensory Evaluation Outcomes to Gain a 21st Century Perspective at Cabrillo College. This coursework, as well as his keen interest in wine, lead him to found Pelican Ranch Winery with his wife Peggy (BW CA-W-3444) in 1997.

== Awards and honors ==
- 1990 National Cooperative Drug Discovery Group (NCDDG) award
- 2004 The UCSC Excellence Through Diversity Award
- 2005 Arthur E. Schwarting Award, Journal of Natural Products
- 2008 Norman R Farnsworth American Society of Pharmacognosy Research Achievement Award
- 2008 Chair, Gordon Research Conference-Marine Natural Products, Ventura Beach, CA
- 2008 Elected Fellow of the American Association for the Advancement of Science
- 2009 Outstanding Faculty Award for the UC Santa Cruz Division of Physical and Biological Sciences
- 2012 American Society of Pharmacognosy Fellow
- 2014 American Society of Pharmacognosy President & Vice President
- 2015 Edward A. Dickson Endowed Professorship award
- 2017 Special Issue of Journal Natural Products in Honor of Professor Phil Crews
