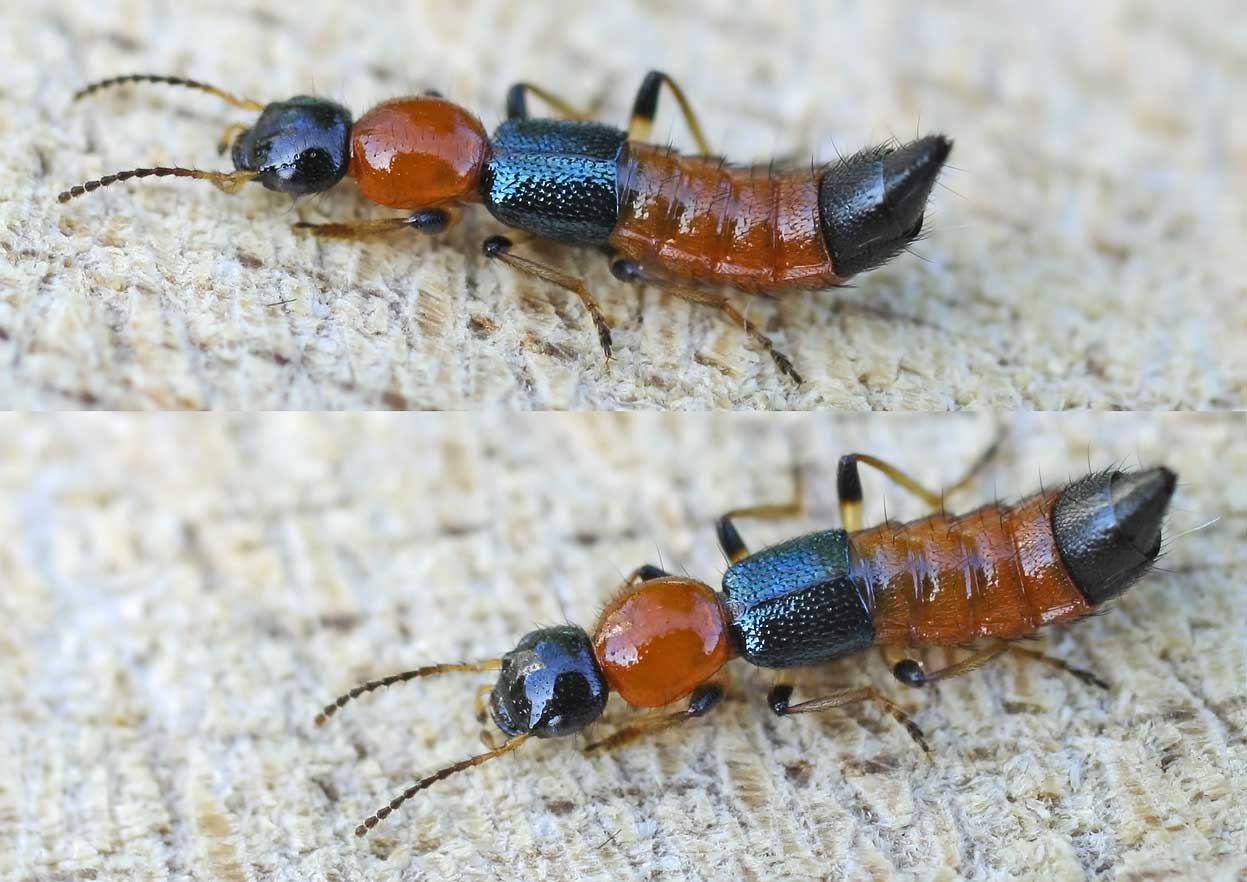

Scientific classification
- Kingdom: Animalia
- Phylum: Arthropoda
- Class: Insecta
- Order: Coleoptera
- Family: Staphylinidae
- Genus: Paederus
- Species: P. eximius and P. sabaeus

Binomial name
- Paederus eximius Reiche, 1850
- Paederus sabaeus Erichson, 1840

= Nairobi fly =

Name for two species of beetle

Nairobi fly (also sometimes "Nairobi Eye") is the common name for two species of rove beetle in the genus Paederus, native to East Africa originating from Tanzania. The beetles contain a corrosive substance known as pederin, which can cause chemical burns if it comes into contact with skin. Because of these burns, the Nairobi fly is sometimes referred to as a "dragon bug."

== Description ==
Adult beetles are predominantly black and red in colour, and measure 6–10 mm in length and 0.5–1.0 mm in width. Their head, lower abdomen, and elytra are black, with the thorax and upper abdomen red.

== Biology ==
The beetles live in moist habitats and are often beneficial to agriculture because they will eat crop pests. Adults are attracted to artificial light sources, and as a result, inadvertently come into contact with humans.

Heavy rains, sometimes brought on by El Niño events, provide the conditions for the Nairobi fly to thrive. Outbreaks have occurred in 1998.

== Relationship to humans ==
=== Paederus dermatitis ===
The beetles neither sting nor bite; their haemolymph contains pederin, a potent toxin that causes blistering and Paederus dermatitis. The toxin is released when the beetle is crushed against the skin, often at night, when sleepers inadvertently brush the insect from their faces. People are advised to gently brush or blow the insect off their skin to prevent irritation. Research from a group at the University of Hyderabad in 2024 found that the use of LED lights at night may be a solution to prevent attacks.
