= Pachypaederus =

Scientific classification
- Kingdom: Animalia
- Phylum: Arthropoda
- Clade: Pancrustacea
- Class: Insecta
- Order: Coleoptera
- Suborder: Polyphaga
- Infraorder: Staphyliniformia
- Family: Staphylinidae
- Subtribe: Paederina
- Genus: Pachypaederus; Fagel, 1958

Type species
- Paederus riparius

Species
- Pachypaederus anita, Janak, 1998; Pachypaederus bidens Willers, 2003; Pachypaederus capillaris (Fauvel, 1895); Pachypaederus crassus Fagel, 1965; Pachypaederus garambanus Fagel, 1959; Pachypaederus kaboboensis Fagel, 1960; Pachypaederus lasti Fagel, 1961; Pachypaederus newtoni (Last, 1950); and more...

Genus of beetles

Pachypaederus is a genus of small beetles of the family Staphylinidae ("rove beetles").
