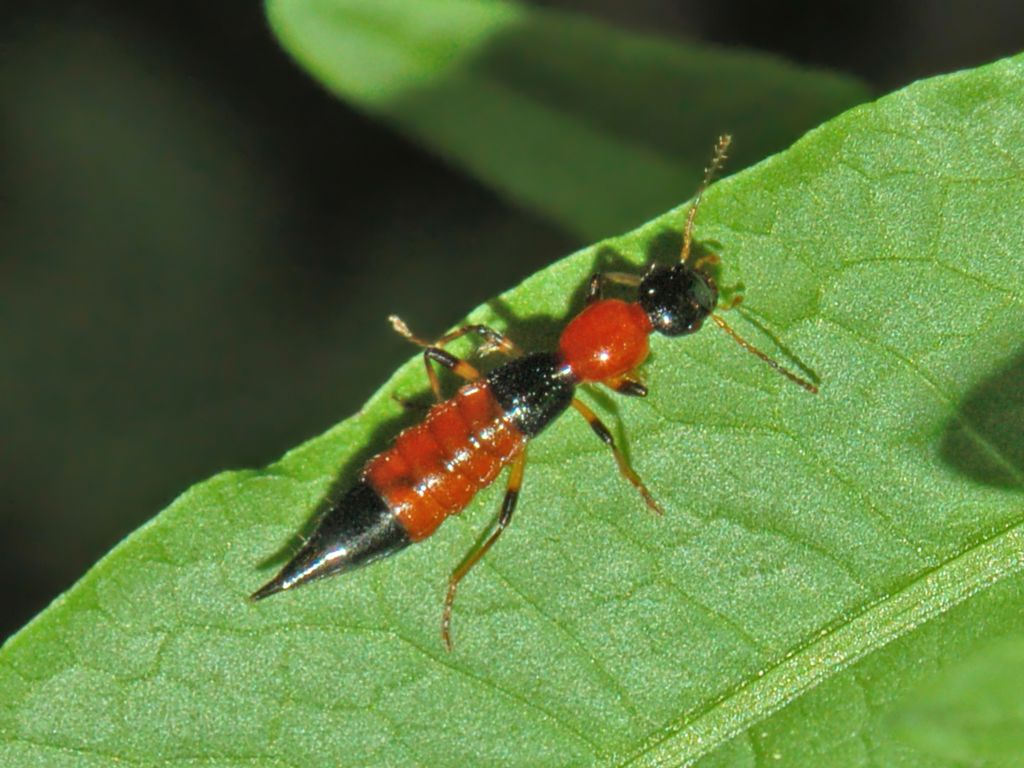

Scientific classification
- Kingdom: Animalia
- Phylum: Arthropoda
- Clade: Pancrustacea
- Class: Insecta
- Order: Coleoptera
- Suborder: Polyphaga
- Infraorder: Staphyliniformia
- Family: Staphylinidae
- Genus: Paederus
- Species: P. baudii

Binomial name
- Paederus baudii Fairmaire, 1859

Synonyms
- Harpopaederus schoenherri; Paederus schoenherri Czwalina, 1899

= Paederus baudii =

Species of beetle

Paederus baudii is a species of rove beetle belonging to the family Staphylinidae subfamily Paederinae.

== Distribution and habitat ==
These beetles are mainly present in France, Italy, and Switzerland. They can mainly be encountered in moisty habitats, especially on the banks of ponds and marshy meadows.

== Description ==
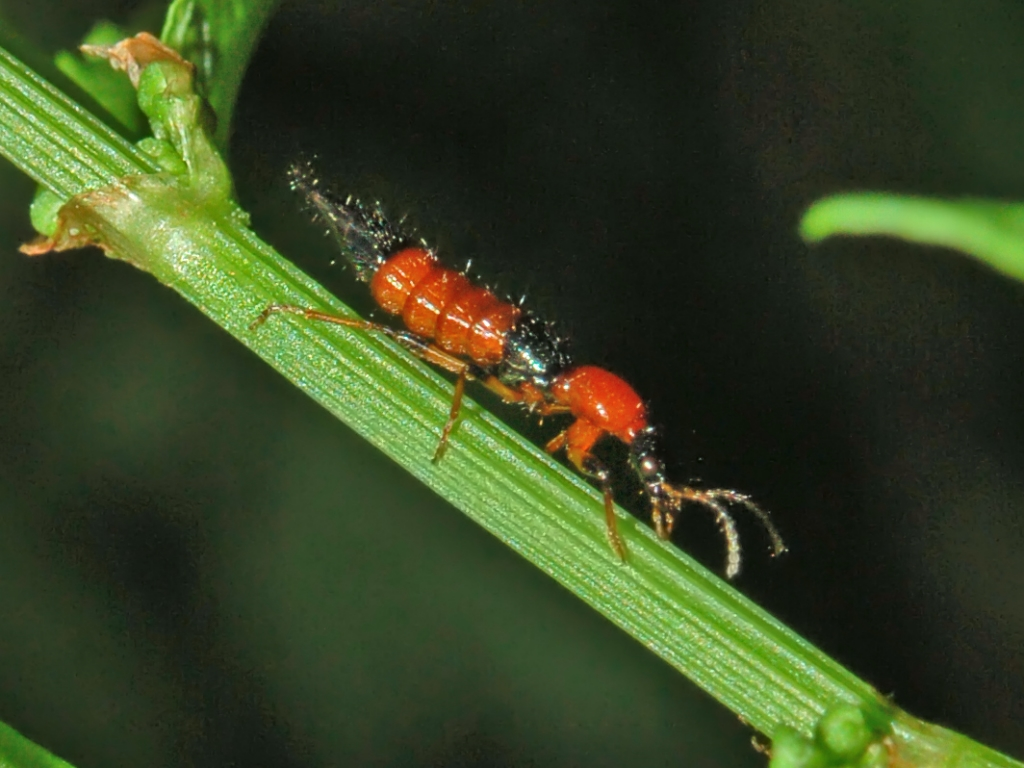
Paederus baudii – Lateral view

The adults grow up to 7–9 millimetres (0.28–0.35 in) long. The head is black, antennae and legs are yellowish, while the apex of the femora is black. Pronotum is red. The elytra are black. Abdomen is black except for the first 4 segments that are red. This species has a very narrow base of elytra, elytra widened in the back and the head much bigger than similar ones.

== Biology ==
They can secrete by abdominal glands an urticant substance. Larvae and adults are predators of small insects.
