= Paederina =

Scientific classification
- Kingdom: Animalia
- Phylum: Arthropoda
- Clade: Pancrustacea
- Class: Insecta
- Order: Coleoptera
- Suborder: Polyphaga
- Infraorder: Staphyliniformia
- Family: Staphylinidae
- Subfamily: Paederinae
- Tribe: Paederini
- Subtribe: Paederina; Fleming, 1821

Genera
- Allopaederus Fagel, 1958; Ctenopaederus Fagel, 1958; Diplopaederus Scheerpeltz, 1957; Eupaederus Scheerpeltz, 1957; Lobopaederus Scheerpeltz, 1957; Madecapaederus Fagel, 1958; Oncopaederus Scheerpeltz, 1957; Oreopaederus Fagel, 1958; Pachypaederus Fagel, 1958; Paederidus Mulsant & Rey, 1878; Paederus Fabricius, 1775; Parameropaederus Scheerpeltz, 1957; Uncopaederus Korge, 1969

Subtribe of beetles

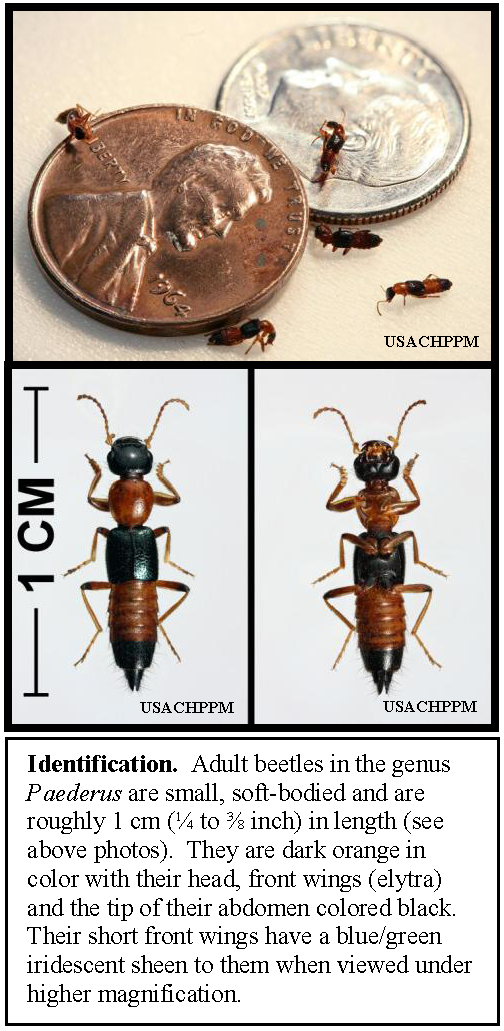
Three images showing rove beetles of the genus Paederus: beetles with US coins to show size, dorsal view, and ventral view

Paederina is a subtribe of small beetles of the family Staphylinidae ("rove beetles").
