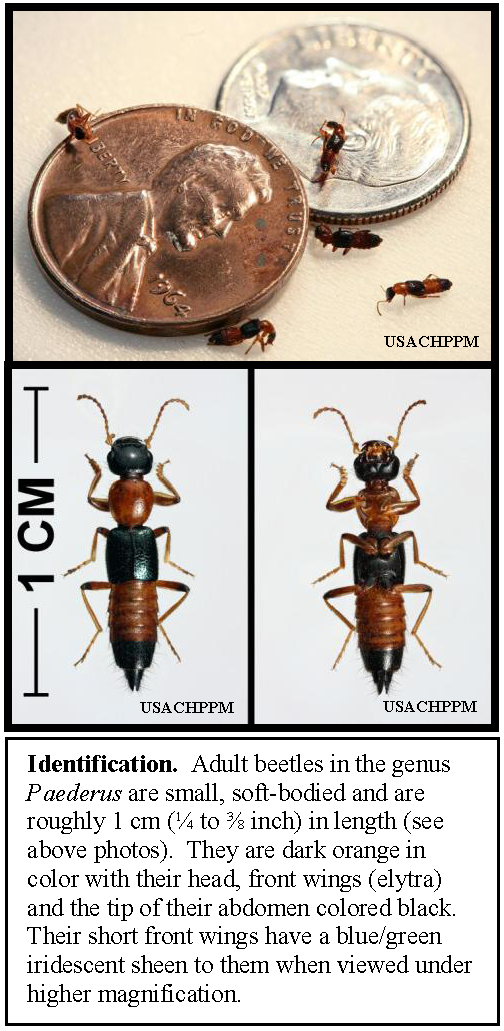

Scientific classification
- Kingdom: Animalia
- Phylum: Arthropoda
- Clade: Pancrustacea
- Class: Insecta
- Order: Coleoptera
- Suborder: Polyphaga
- Infraorder: Staphyliniformia
- Family: Staphylinidae
- Tribe: Paederini
- Subtribe: Paederina
- Genus: Paederus; Fabricius, 1775

Type species
- Paederus riparius

Species
- Over 600; see text

= Paederus =

Genus of beetles

Paederus is a genus of small beetles of the family Staphylinidae ("rove beetles"). With 622 valid species assigned by 1987 to the subtribe Paederina (Paederus and its close allies), and with all but 148 within Paederus itself, this is a large genus.

Due to toxins in the hemolymph of some species within this genus, it has given its name to paederus dermatitis, a characteristic skin irritation that occurs if one of the insects is crushed against skin. A scholarly paper in 2002 suggested that a Paederus species could have been responsible for some of the ten Plagues of Egypt described in the Bible's Book of Exodus.

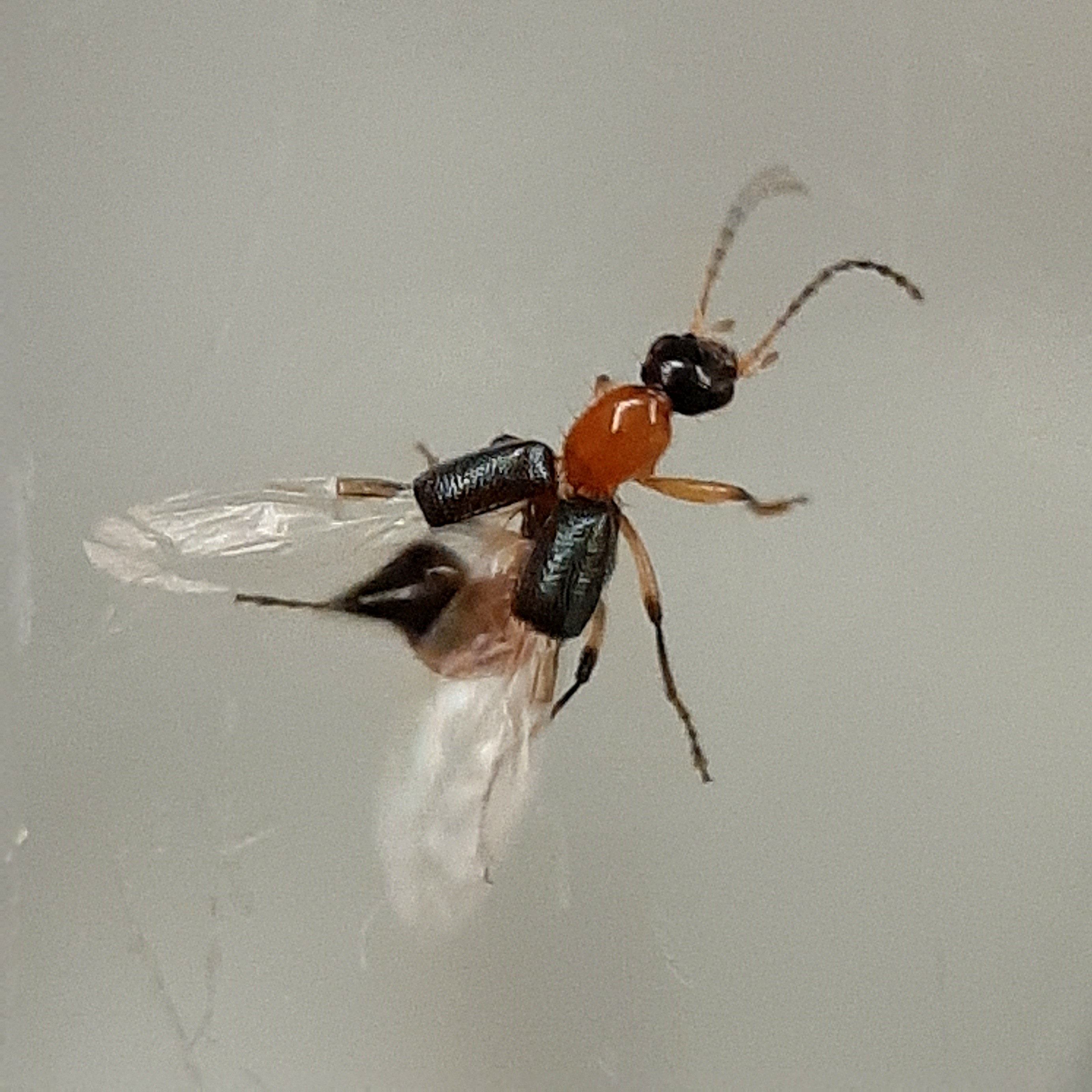
Unidentified Paederus spreading its wings, Malaysia

Paederus species are widely distributed around the world.

== Description ==
Paederus species are much more brightly colored than most other rove beetles, with metallic blue- or green-colored elytra and many with bright orange or red on the pronotum and the basal segments of the abdomen. These bright colors may be an example of aposematism, a warning signal to potential predators.

== Biology ==
Although most adult rove beetles avoid daylight, Paederus species are active during the day and attracted to bright lights after nightfall.

Paederus eggs are laid singly, in moist habitats. Larvae go through two instars before pupation. Both larvae and adults are predatory on other insects. Because of their preference for moist soil, large numbers of Paederus beetles may be attracted to irrigated farmland, where they provide some benefit by eating herbivorous insects but can cause problems for people working in fields or grassy areas.

=== Pederin ===
A 2009 review found that "[a]t least 20 of the more than 600 species of Paederus beetles have been associated with Paederus dermatitis", though Paederus beetles do not bite or sting. This skin irritation results from contact with pederin, a vesicant toxin in the hemolymph of many females in the genus Paederus. The toxin is manufactured, not by the beetles themselves, but by endosymbiont bacteria, probably some species of Pseudomonas.

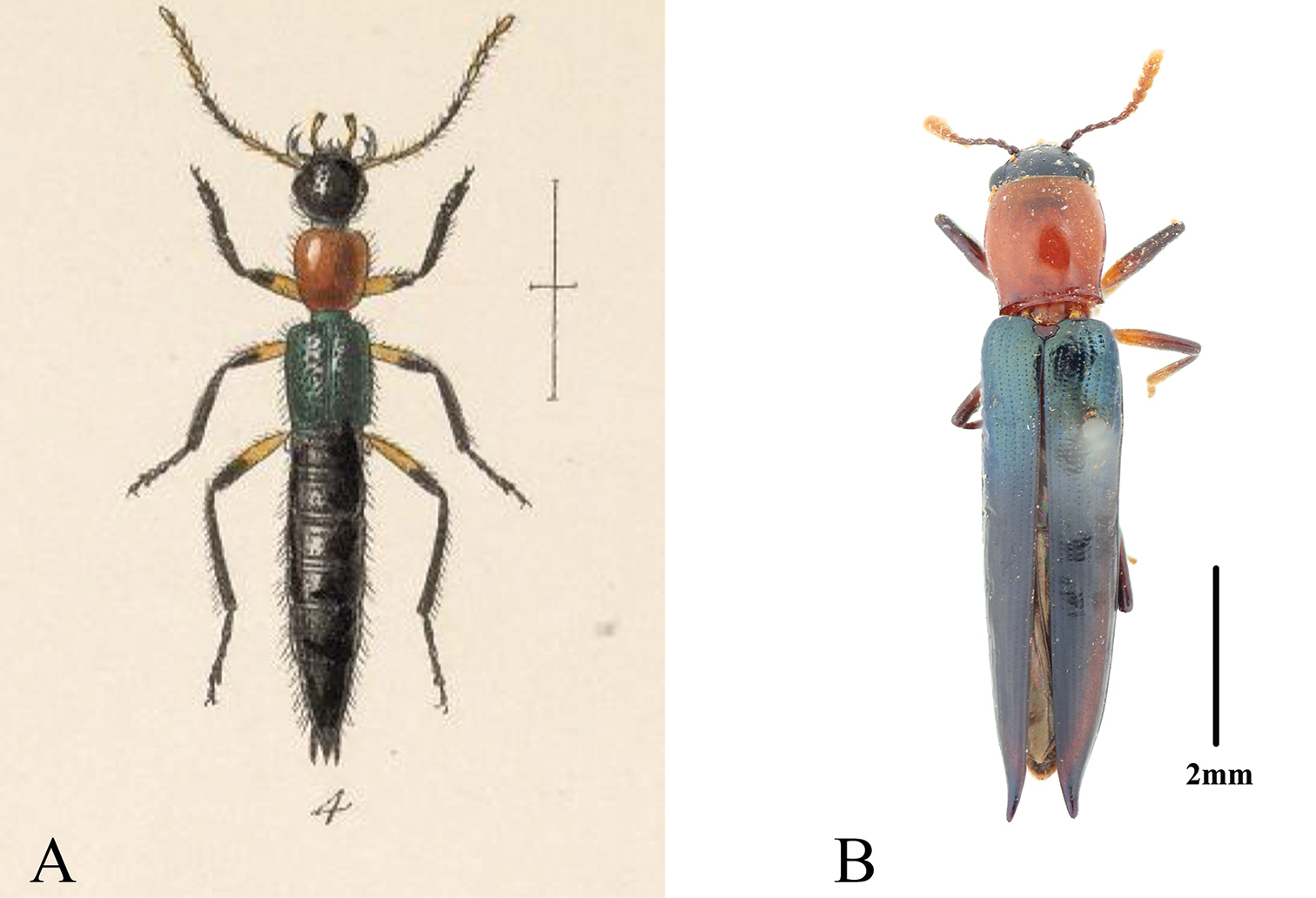
Comparison between Paederus signaticornis (left) and the lizard beetle Tomolanguria aculeata (right)

There seem to be cases of mimicry between Paederus and unrelated non-noxious (or perhaps less or differently noxious) beetles. Among the lizard beetle relatives, nowadays united with the pleasing fungus beetles in family Erotylidae, in particular the genus Paederolanguria stands out, named after its visual similarity in coloration and shape to Paederus, while being closely related to the lizard beetle genus Languria. The genera Stenolanguria and Tomolanguria are similarly convergent. Genus Anadastus and the species Clerolanguria tricolor and Languria trifasciata are shaped like more typical lizard beetles, but also mimic an aposematic coloration.

== Impact on humans ==
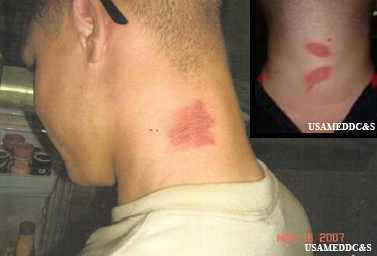
Typical clinical appearance of Paederus dermatitis

Paederus dermatitis is caused when a pederin-containing beetle is crushed, even partially, against the skin. This skin irritation is also called "dermatitis linearis" or "linear dermatitis" because one can inadvertently drag a beetle across the skin in a more-or-less straight line when trying to brush it away. The resulting inflammation will also be linear. Because Paederus species are widely dispersed around the world, this syndrome has many different local nicknames including "whiplash dermatitis", "spider lick", and "Nairobi fly dermatitis". In East Africa, conjunctivitis from getting pederin in the eye is called "Nairobi eye".

Once pederin is on the skin from the initial beetle contact, it may also be spread elsewhere on the skin. "Kissing" or "mirror-image" lesions where two skin areas come in contact (for example, the elbow flexure) are often seen. Washing the hands and skin with soap and water is strongly recommended if contact with a rove beetle has occurred.

Initial skin contact with pederin shows no immediate result. Within 12–36 hours, however, a reddish rash (erythema) appears, which develops into blisters. Irritation, including crusting and scaling, may last from two to three weeks.

=== Mass infestations ===
An article in The Lancet suggests that events like those described as the first two of the ten plagues of Egypt (anoxic die-off in the Nile, followed by many dead frogs) would have created ideal breeding conditions for P. alfierii. The authors suggest that the plague of "boils" could be the skin irritation, typically delayed by a day or more, resulting from contact with Paederus during the third or fourth plagues (lice or flies). They also note that Paederus infestations are often localized, so it would be quite possible for them to have invaded Pharaoh's palace but not the homes of the Jews.

Many modern occurrences of localized but intense Paederus impact are documented in research papers with titles like "An outbreak of paederus dermatitis in a suburban hospital in Sri Lanka", "An outbreak of 268 cases of Paederus dermatitis in a toy-building factory in central China", "Outbreak of dermatitis linearis caused by Paederus ilsae and Paederus iliensis (Coleoptera: Staphylinidae) at a military base in Iraq", and "Evacuation of an Aboriginal community in response to an outbreak of blistering dermatitis induced by a beetle (Paederus australis)".

== Selected species ==
By 1987, 622 distinct species were recognized, and the discovery of new rove beetle species is ongoing. Some members of Paederus are:

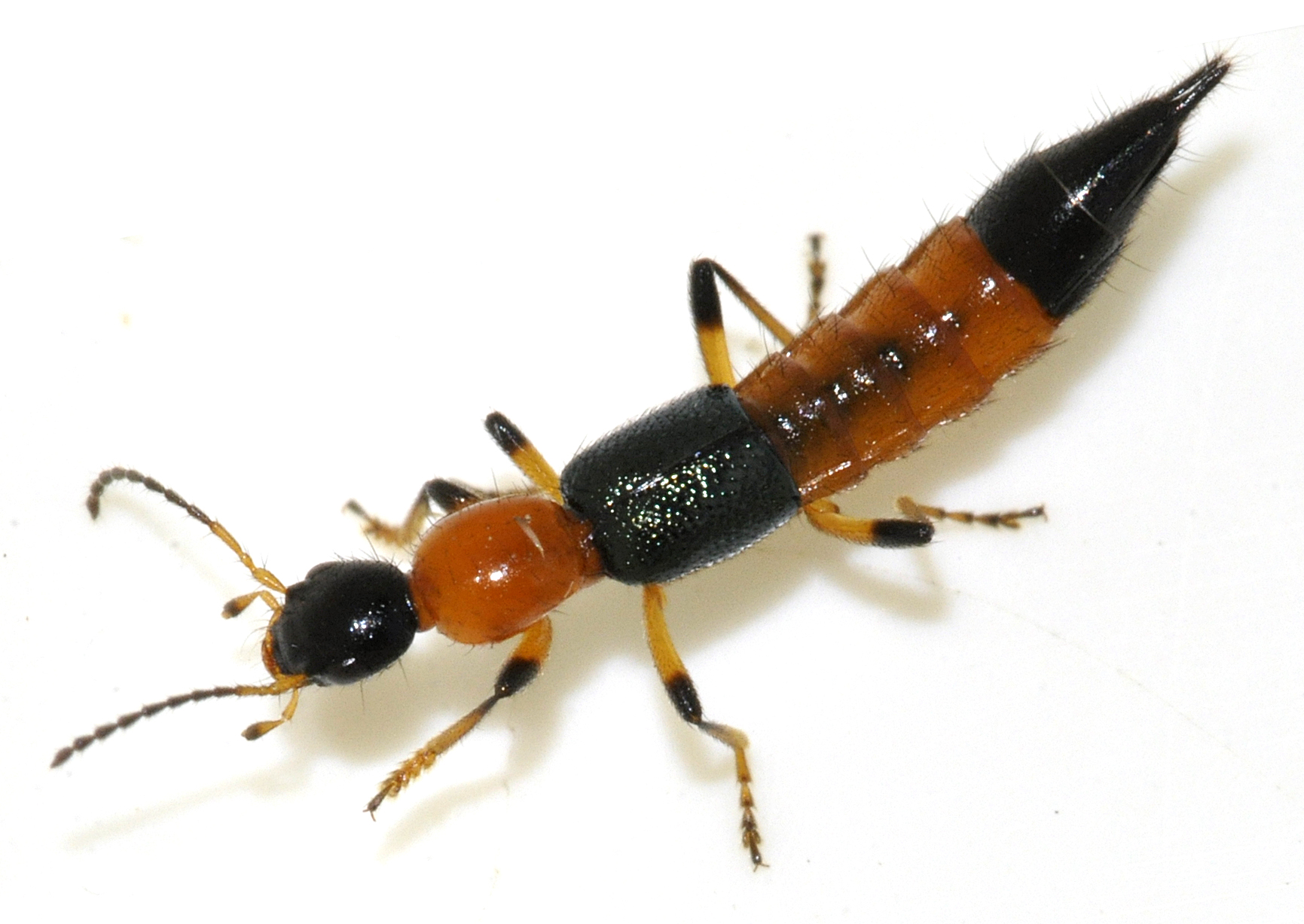
Paederus balcanicus from Ketzür, Germany

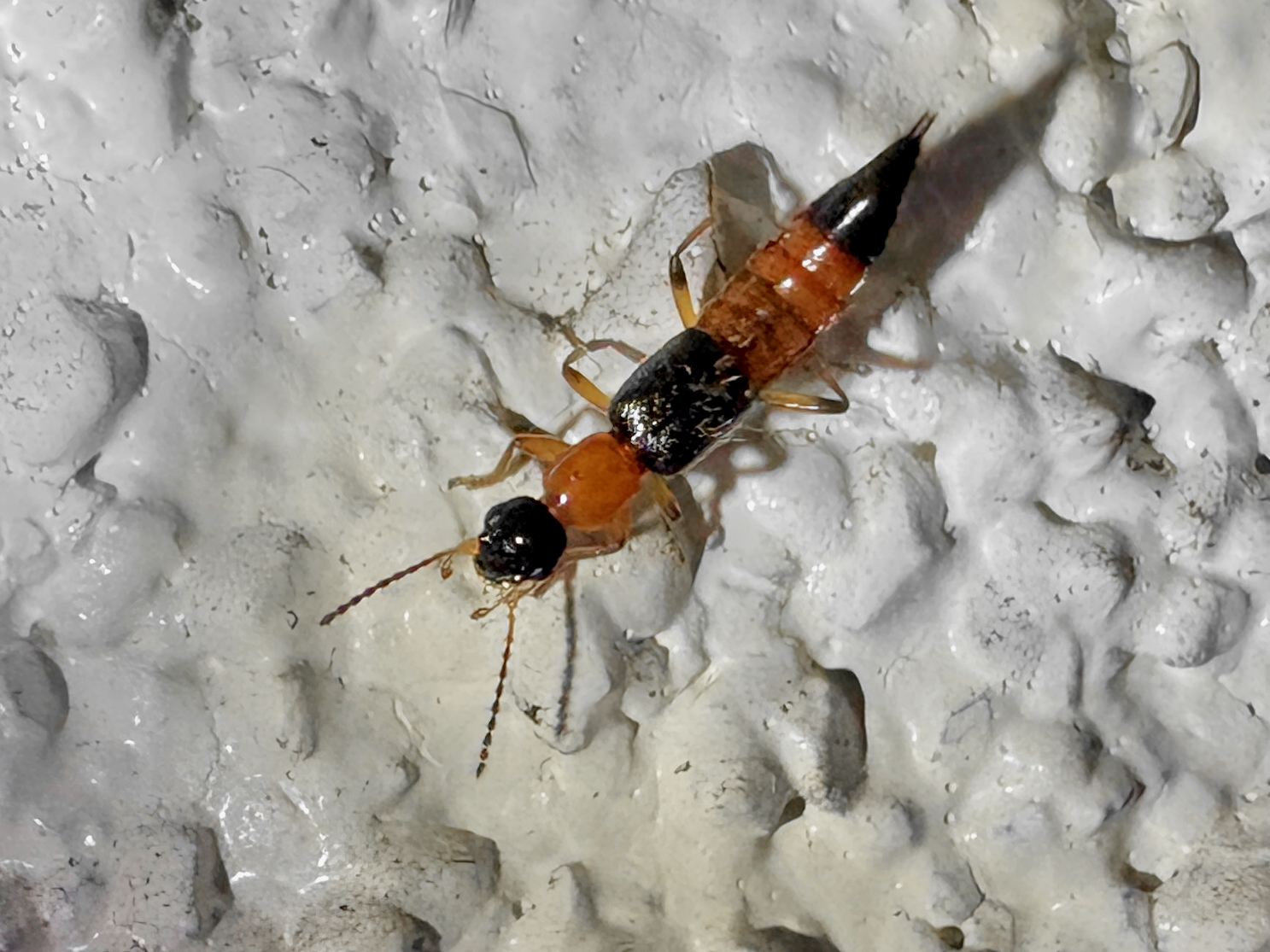
Paederus fuscipes in Kasugai, Japan

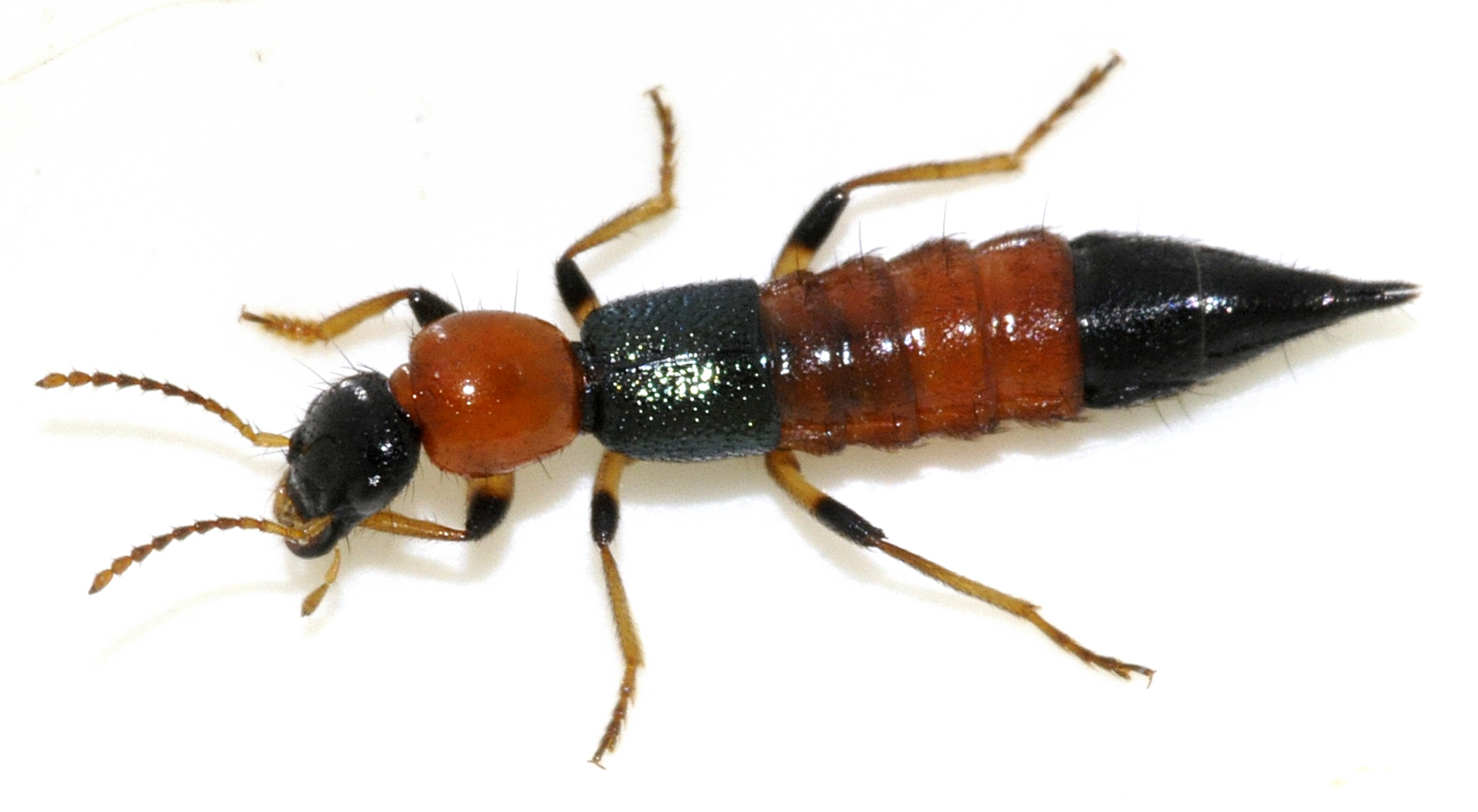
Paederus littoralis from Friedland, Germany

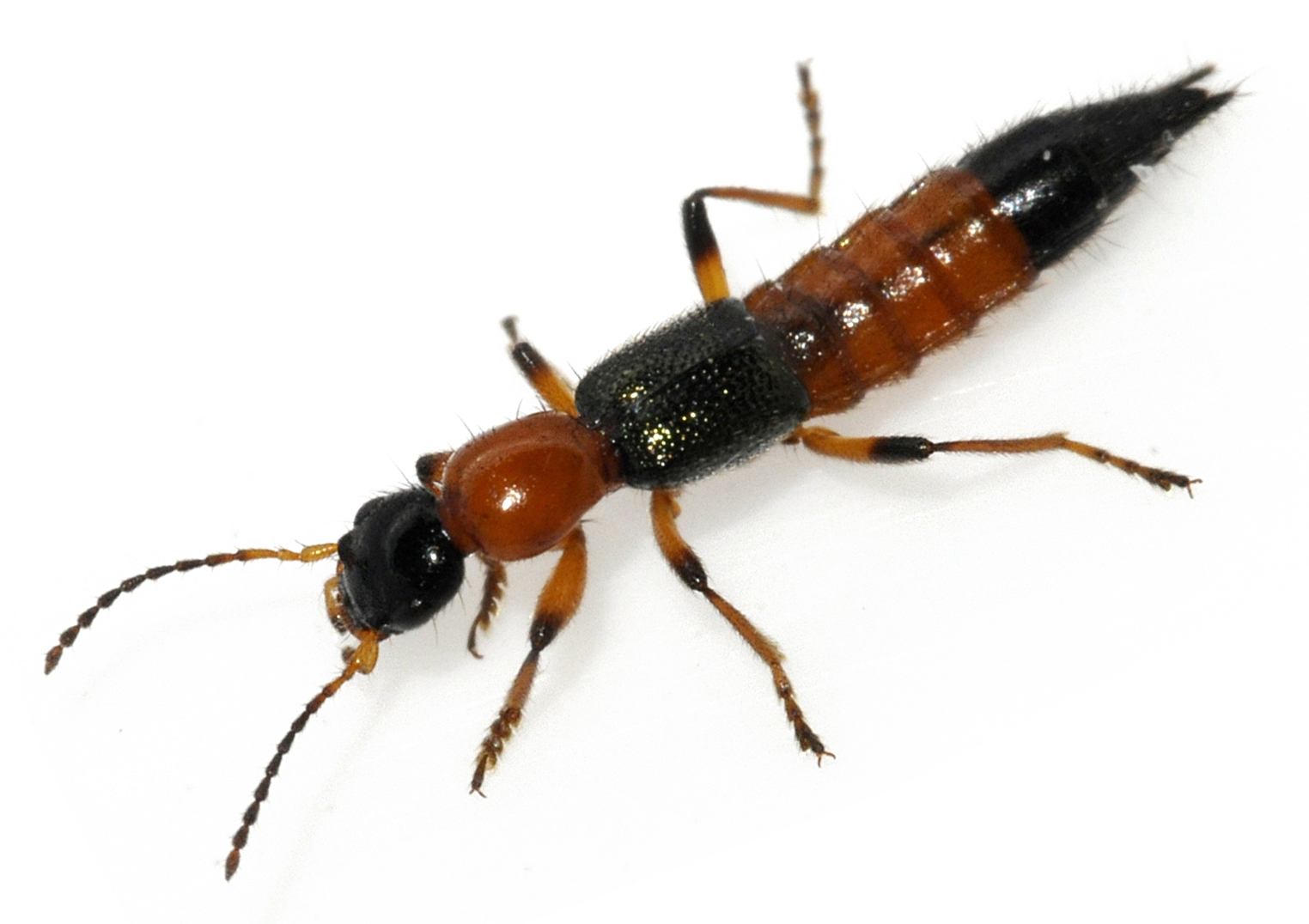
Paederus riparius from Ornbau, Germany

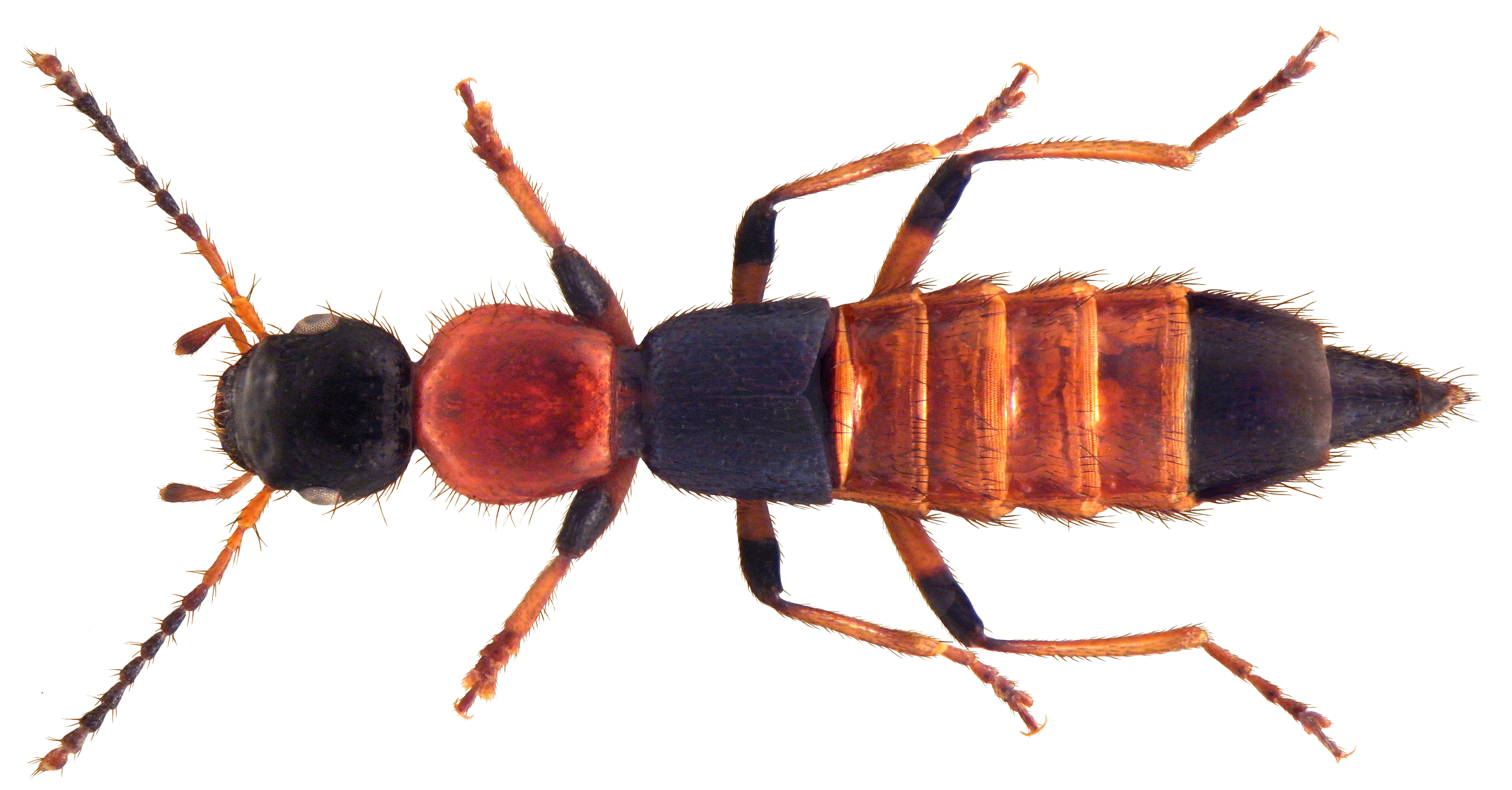
Paederus schoenherri from Donnerskirchen, Austria

- Paederus abdominalis
- Paederus albipilis
- Paederus alfierii
- Paederus alternans
- Paederus amazonicus
- Paederus australis
- Paederus austriacus Schrank 1781
- Paederus balcanicus Koch, 1938
- Paederus baudii
- Paederus brasiliensis
- Paederus brevipennis Lacordaire, 1835
- Paederus caligatus Erichson, 1840
- Paederus clavicornis Lentz, 1856
- Paederus columbinus
- Paederus cruenticollis
- Paederus eximius (= P.crebrepunctatus) – Eastern "Nairobi fly"
- Paederus ferus
- Paederus flavitarsis
- Paederus fuscipes Curtis, 1826
- Paederus haematoderus Gemminger & Harold, 1868
- Paederus iliensis
- Paederus ilsae (often in P.fuscipes or P.littoralis)
- Paederus islae
- Paederus laetus
- Paederus limnophilus Erichson, 1840
- Paederus listeri
- Paederus littoralis Gravenhorst, 1802
- Paederus melampus
- Paederus melanurus Aragona, 1830
- Paederus monticola
- Paederus mutans
- Paederus ornaticornis (= P.irritans)
- Paederus peregrinus
- Paederus pelikani Reitter, 1884
- Paederus protensus
- Paederus puncticollis
- Paederus ragusai Adorno & Zanetti, 1999
- Paederus riparius (Linnaeus, 1758)
- Paederus rubrothoracicus
- Paederus ruficollis
- Paederus rufocyaneus
- Paederus rutilicornis
- Paederus sabaeus – Western "Nairobi fly"
- Paederus schoenherri Czwalina, 1889 (= P.schulzei)
- Paederus signaticornis Sharp, 1886
- Paederus tamulus
- Paederus verbasci Schrank, 1798
- Paederus yucateca

The species of Paederus are divided among several subgenera; some of these were historically (and a few, occasionally, are even today) considered distinct genera:

- Anomalopaederus
- Eopaederus
- Gnathopaederus
- Harpopaederus
- Heteropaederus
- Megalopaederus
- Neopaederus
- Nepalopaederus
- Oedopaederus (disputed)
- Oreinopaederus
- Paederognathus
- Paederus
- Poederomorphus
- Pseudopaederus
