= List of Aleochara species =

This is a list of 156 species in Aleochara, a genus of rove beetles in the family Staphylinidae.

== Aleochara species ==
- Aleochara albopila (Mulsant & Rey, 1852)^{g}
- Aleochara albovillosa Bernhauer, 1901 200^{u}
- Aleochara algarum Fauvel, 1862^{u}
- Aleochara angusticeps Sharp, 1883^{i c g}
- Aleochara antennalis Fenyes, 1914^{g}
- Aleochara arizonica Klimaszewski, 1984^{i c g}
- Aleochara ashei Maus, 2000^{i c g}
- Aleochara asiatica Kraatz, 1859^{g}
- Aleochara assiniboin Klimaszewski, 1985^{g}
- Aleochara aterrima Gravenhorst, 1802^{g}
- Aleochara atra Gravenhorst, 1806^{g}
- Aleochara baranowskii Klimaszewski and Génier, 1987^{i c g}
- Aleochara beckeri Klimaszewski in Klimaszewski, Frank and Peck, 1990^{i c g}
- Aleochara bellonata Krása, 1922^{g}
- Aleochara bilineata Gyllenhal, 1810^{i c g}
- Aleochara bimaculata Gravenhorst, 1802^{i c g}
- Aleochara binotata Kraatz, 1856^{g u}
- Aleochara bipustulata (Linnaeus, 1761)^{i c g u}
- Aleochara bonariensis Lynch, 1884^{g}
- Aleochara brevipennis Gravenhorst, 1806^{g u}
- Aleochara brundini Bernhauer, 1936^{g}
- Aleochara bucharoensis Lohse, 1988^{g}
- Aleochara capitinigra
- Aleochara carmanah Klimaszewski, 2002^{g}
- Aleochara castaneipennis Mannerheim, 1843^{i c g}
- Aleochara cavernicola Klimaszewski, 1984^{i c g}
- Aleochara cayennensis Laporte de Castelnau, 1835^{g}
- Aleochara centralis Sharp, 1883^{i c g}
- Aleochara clavicornis Redtenbacher, 1849^{g}
- Aleochara coreana Bernhauer, 1926^{g}
- Aleochara cornuta Fauvel, 1886^{g}
- Aleochara crassa Baudi di Selve, 1848^{g}
- Aleochara crassiuscula Sahlberg, C.R., 1831^{u}
- Aleochara cribrata Fenyes^{g}
- Aleochara cristata Assing, 2009^{g}
- Aleochara cuniculorum Kraatz, 1858^{g u}
- Aleochara curtidens Klimaszewski, 1984^{i c g}
- Aleochara curtula (Goeze, 1777)^{i c g b u}
- Aleochara daviesi Klimaszewski & Brunke, 2012^{g}
- Aleochara densissima Bernhauer, 1906^{i c g}
- Aleochara depressa (Sharp, 1883)^{i c g}
- Aleochara dilatata Erichson, 1840^{g}
- Aleochara discipennis Mulsant & Rey, 1853^{g u}
- Aleochara diversa (Sahlberg, J., 1876) non Mulsant & Rey, 1853^{u}
- Aleochara diversicollis Fauvel, 1900^{g}
- Aleochara eoa ^{g}
- Aleochara erythroptera Gravenhorst, 1806^{g}
- Aleochara fenyesi Bernhauer, 1905^{i c g}
- Aleochara formosae Cameron, 1940^{g}
- Aleochara formosanorum Pace, 1993^{g}
- Aleochara fucicola Sharp, 1874^{g}
- Aleochara fumata Gravenhorst, 1802^{i c g u}
- Aleochara funebris Wollaston, 1864^{g u}
- Aleochara gaudiuscula Tottenham, 1939^{g}
- Aleochara gracilicornis Bernhauer, 1901^{i c g}
- Aleochara granulicauda Cameron, 1935^{g}
- Aleochara grisea Kraatz, 1856 (Kraatz, 1806)^{g u}
- Aleochara haematoptera Kraatz, 1858^{g}
- Aleochara haemoptera Kraatz, 1856^{g}
- Aleochara haworthi Stephens, 1832^{g}
- Aleochara hayamai Yamamoto & Maruyama^{g}
- Aleochara heeri Likovský, 1982^{g}
- Aleochara hydrocephala Fauvel, 1900^{g}
- Aleochara inconspicua Aubé, 1850^{g u}
- Aleochara inexpectata Klimaszewski^{g}
- Aleochara inexspectata Klimaszewski, 1984^{i c g}
- Aleochara insularis Fenyes^{g}
- Aleochara intricata Mannerheim, 1830^{g u}
- Aleochara irmgardis Vogt, 1954^{g}
- Aleochara kamila Likovský, 1984^{g u}
- Aleochara lacertina Sharp, 1883^{i c g}
- Aleochara laevigata Gyllenhal, 1810^{g}
- Aleochara lanuginosa Gravenhorst, 1802^{i c g u}
- Aleochara laramiensis (Casey, 1906)^{i c g}
- Aleochara lata Gravenhorst, 1802^{i c g b u}
- Aleochara laticornis Kraatz, 1856^{g}
- Aleochara leivasorum
- Aleochara lindbergi Likovský, 1963^{g}
- Aleochara littoralis (Mäklin, 1853)^{i c g b}
- Aleochara lobata Klimaszewski, 1984^{i c g}
- Aleochara lucifuga (Casey, 1893)^{i c g}
- Aleochara lustrica Say, 1834^{i c g b}
- Aleochara lygaea Kraatz, 1862^{g u}
- Aleochara maculata Brisout de Barneville, 1863^{g u}
- Aleochara major Fairmaire, 1858^{g}
- Aleochara marmotae Sainte-Claire Deville, 1927^{g}
- Aleochara milleri Kraatz, 1862^{g}
- Aleochara minuta (Casey, 1906)^{i c g}
- Aleochara moerens Gyllenhal, 1827^{g u}
- Aleochara moesta Gravenhorst, 1802^{g u}
- Aleochara nidicola Klimaszewski, 1984^{i c g}
- Aleochara nigra Kraatz, 1859^{g}
- Aleochara niponensis Sharp, 1888^{g}
- Aleochara notula Erichson, 1839^{i c g}
- Aleochara nubis (Assing, 1995)^{g}
- Aleochara obesa Coiffait, 1980^{g}
- Aleochara obscurella Gravenhorst, 1806^{g u}
- Aleochara ocularis Klimaszewski, 1984^{i c g}
- Aleochara opacella (Sharp, 1883)^{i c g}
- Aleochara opacina Fauvel, 1900^{g}
- Aleochara pacifica (Casey, 1894)^{i c g b}
- Aleochara parens Sharp, 1874^{g}
- Aleochara pauxilla sensu auctt. non Mulsant & Rey, 1874^{u}
- Aleochara peeziana Lohse, 1961^{g}
- Aleochara penicillata Peyerimhoff, 1901^{g}
- Aleochara peusi Wagner, 1949^{g}
- Aleochara phycophila Allen, 1937^{g u}
- Aleochara postica Walker, 1855^{g}
- Aleochara praesul Sharp, 1874^{g}
- Aleochara pseudochrysorrhoa Caron, Mise & Klimaszewski, 2008^{g}
- Aleochara pseudolustrica Klimaszewski in Klimaszewski, Frank and Peck, 1990^{i c g}
- Aleochara puberula Klug, 1834^{i c g}
- Aleochara puetzi (Assing, 1995)^{g}
- Aleochara pulchra Gravenhorst, 1806^{g}
- Aleochara punctatella Motschulsky, 1858^{g u}
- Aleochara quadrata Sharp, 1883^{i c g}
- Aleochara rubricalis (Casey, 1911)^{i c g}
- Aleochara rubripennis (Casey, 1906)^{i c g b}
- Aleochara ruficornis Gravenhorst, 1802^{g u}
- Aleochara rufobrunnea Klimaszewski, 1984^{i c g}
- Aleochara rufonigra Klimaszewski, 1984^{i c g}
- Aleochara salina Fauvel, 1885^{g}
- Aleochara sallaei Sharp, 1883^{i c g}
- Aleochara salsipotens Bernhauer, 1912^{g}
- Aleochara sanguinea (Linnaeus, 1758)^{g u}
- Aleochara sculptiventris (Casey, 1893)^{i c g b}
- Aleochara segregata Yamamoto & Maruyama^{g}
- Aleochara sekanai Klimaszewski, 1985^{i c g}
- Aleochara semirubra Graëlls, 1858^{g}
- Aleochara sequoia Klimaszewski and Génier, 1987^{i c g}
- Aleochara shelleyae Klimaszewski & Langor, 2011^{g}
- Aleochara signaticollis Fairmaire & Germain^{g}
- Aleochara solieri Bernhauer & Scheerpeltz, 1926^{g}
- Aleochara solskyiana Likovský, 1984^{g}
- Aleochara spadicea (Erichson, 1837)^{g u}
- Aleochara sparsa Heer, 1839^{g u}
- Aleochara speculicollis Bernhauer, 1901^{i c g}
- Aleochara spissicornis Erichson, 1839^{g}
- Aleochara squalithorax Sharp, 1888^{g}
- Aleochara stichai Likovský, 1965^{g u}
- Aleochara suffusa (Casey, 1906)^{i c g}
- Aleochara sulcicollis Mannerheim, 1843^{i c g b}
- Aleochara taeniata Erichson, 1839^{i c g}
- Aleochara tahoensis Casey, 1906^{i c g}
- Aleochara taiwanensis Pace, 2010^{g}
- Aleochara tenuicornis Kraatz, 1856^{g}
- Aleochara thoracica Casey, 1906^{i c g}
- Aleochara tristis Gravenhorst, 1806^{i c g u}
- Aleochara trisulcata Weise, 1877^{g}
- Aleochara unicolor Klimaszewski, 1984^{i c g}
- Aleochara vagepunctata Kraatz, 1856^{g}
- Aleochara valida LeConte, 1858^{i c g}
- Aleochara verna Say, 1836^{i c g u}
- Aleochara villosa Mannerheim, 1830^{i c g u}
- Aleochara wickhami (Casey, 1906)^{i c g}
- Aleochara yaeyamensis ^{g}
- Aleochara yamato Yamamoto & Maruyama^{g}
- Aleochara zerchei (Assing, 1995)^{g}

Data sources: i = ITIS, c = Catalogue of Life, g = GBIF, b = Bugguide.net, u = Beetles of the British Isles
