= Aleochara pacifica =

Scientific classification
- Kingdom: Animalia
- Phylum: Arthropoda
- Class: Insecta
- Order: Coleoptera
- Suborder: Polyphaga
- Infraorder: Staphyliniformia
- Family: Staphylinidae
- Genus: Aleochara
- Species: A. pacifica

Binomial name
- Aleochara pacifica (Casey, 1894)

Synonyms
- Polistoma pacifica Casey, 1894

Species of beetle

Aleochara pacifica is a species of rove beetle in the family Staphylinidae. It is found in Central America and North America.
