= Aleochara littoralis =

Scientific classification
- Kingdom: Animalia
- Phylum: Arthropoda
- Class: Insecta
- Order: Coleoptera
- Suborder: Polyphaga
- Infraorder: Staphyliniformia
- Family: Staphylinidae
- Genus: Aleochara
- Species: A. littoralis

Binomial name
- Aleochara littoralis (Mäklin, 1853)

Synonyms
- Emplenota arenaria (Casey, 1894); Polistoma arenaria Casey, 1894

Species of beetle

Aleochara littoralis is a species of rove beetle in the family Staphylinidae. It is found in North America.
