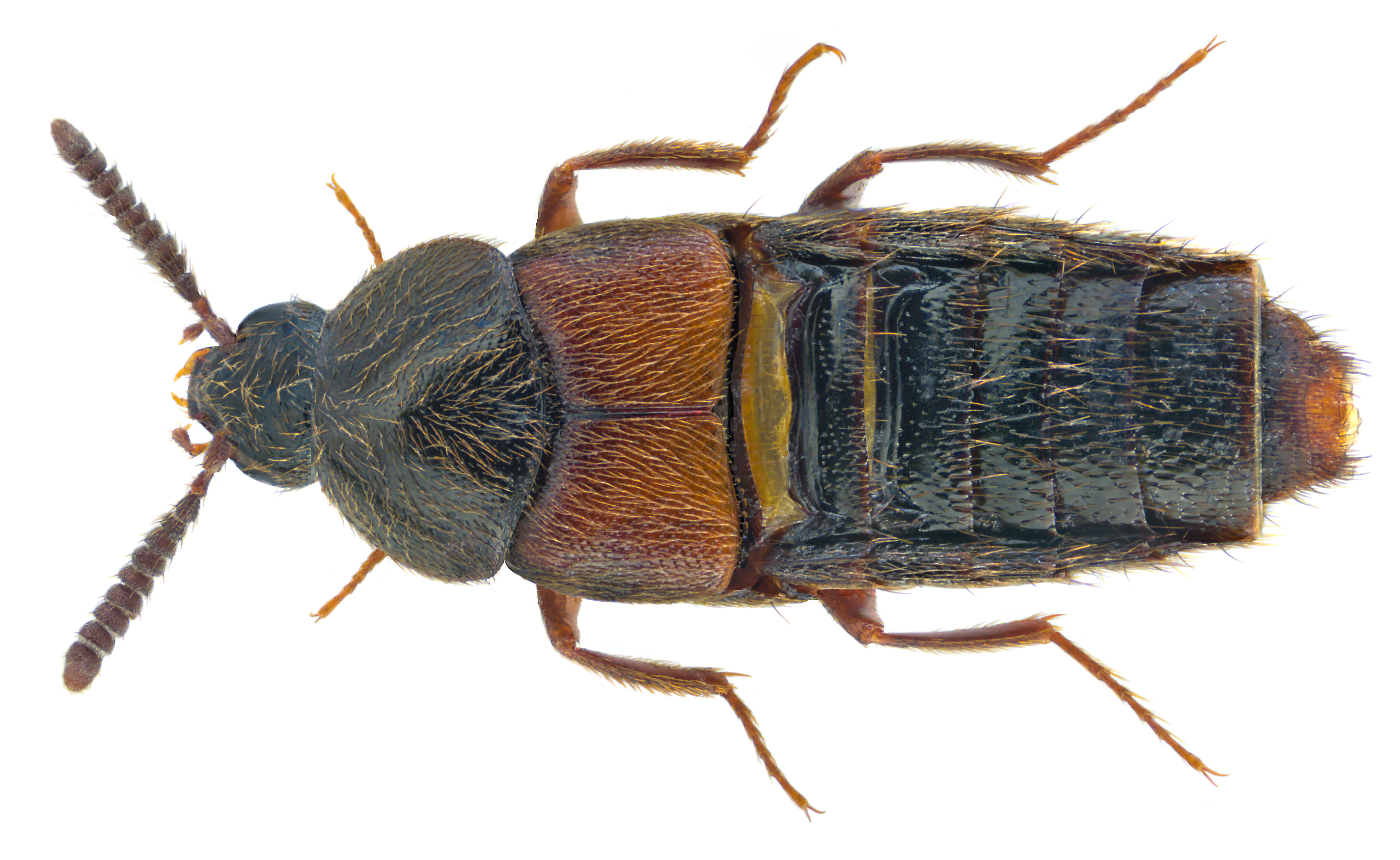

Scientific classification
- Kingdom: Animalia
- Phylum: Arthropoda
- Class: Insecta
- Order: Coleoptera
- Suborder: Polyphaga
- Infraorder: Staphyliniformia
- Family: Staphylinidae
- Genus: Aleochara
- Species: A. curtula

Binomial name
- Aleochara curtula (Goeze, 1777)

= Aleochara curtula =

Species of beetle

Aleochara curtula is a species of rove beetle in the family Staphylinidae. They are commonly known as Shortened Minute Rove Beetle. This beetle is found in Europe, Northern Asia (excluding China) and North America.

This beetle has a few well-known characteristics, such as it’s tendency for homosexuality and sex mimicry. Male beetles of this species will often attempt copulation with other males of these species. Sex mimicry refers to the idea that some individuals choose to mimic and portray themselves as the opposite sex for various reasons.

A. curtula is usually quite small, measuring around 7mm in length. They range from black to brown and have a distinct two-colored elytra. Their eyes are of average size and are approximately half of the length of their head. The beetle has characteristic antennae consisting of brush-like sections.

== Geographic range ==
This beetle lives throughout Europe, northern Asia and North America. A. curtula has been known to occasionally live in eastern Japan, and tropical regions of Africa. They prefer warm weather, and often do best when the situation helps attract their favorite prey.

== Food resources ==
All members of A. curtula feed off of animal carcasses. They often end up on the carcasses of smaller animals, such as rodents, squirrels and rabbits. However, they are not picky about the exact carcass they are living on. This is due to the fact that they do not consume the carcass, but instead parasitize other insect larvae. Their favorite prey often includes flies and other carrion specific scavenger insects.

== Social behavior ==
Males are territorial and aggressive towards other males. However, A. curtula has a strange relationship with pheromones. For various reasons, both males and females change how they present themselves sexually. Males can often avoid intermale aggression by presenting with excess female sex pheromones. Furthermore, this means they can enter other males' territories to look for resources and mates. However, by mimicking females, males are less likely to get a mate, as females prefer mates with low female sex pheromones.

Females also often mimic males with pheromones. Females can more easily move between male territories if they have low levels of female sex pheromones, as well as they can more easily sneak copulations. Some females will maintain their lives as males in order to avoid mating harassment from males. A. curtula mates year-round, meaning that females need a tactic to regulate when they want to reproduce. Often, individual females will spend most of their lives mimicking males so they can selectively choose when they wish to mate.

A. curtula is easily convinced by pheromones of the sex of another member of its species. This means that males are often convinced other males are female and will often attempt copulation with other males who happen to have high levels of female sex pheromones. Males who are unwanted by females, such as younger, starved and males who have mated more, are more likely to participate in homosexual behaviors with other males.

== Life history ==
=== Life cycle ===
Eggs are laid in carcasses that are already fresh with other insect larvae. This is because the larvae of A. curtula will feed off of these insect larvae. After hatching, larvae will seek out the pupal stages of other insects. They can often track and find these pupae due to volatiles and waste matter dispelled from the pupal insects. Then, they will consume the pupa in order to pupate themselves. The only way for larvae of A. curtula to pupate is to find an insect pupa to parasitize. This creates competition between siblings that were laid on the same carcass, as well as from unrelated A. curtula individuals. As individuals age, their general size is determined by their larval success in finding larger insect larvae to predate on.

As males age, they slowly lose the ability to produce the female sex hormone. All males start with the ability to produce the hormone, as females are as well. Females are able to consistently produce the female sex pheromone throughout their lives. As a male starts to mature, inhibitory pheromones stop the production of the female sex pheromone.

== Mating ==
=== Male/Male interactions ===
The male reproductive system hinges on the endophallus. The endophallus of this rove beetle functions to both deposit sperm as well as remove rival sperm. The endophallus of the male will be inserted into the female’s genital chamber and wrapped around her spermathecal duct. This action forces the endophallus into a U-shape, filling the chamber and helping with the implantation of the spermatophore.

The male reproductive system further uses this endophallus system to push rival sperm out, and small-brush-like structures help remove rival sperm. When the male endophallus extends around to fill the chamber, many of the sperm are also compressed and pushed against the walls of the female genital chamber, which makes them less likely to fertilize the female. The last way that they perform sperm competition is by depositing excess sperm and filling the entirety of the genital chamber.

After the implantation of the spermatophore, the spermatophore itself will elongate, swell, and expand to attach to the spermatheca and the female genital chamber. Then, the spermatophore is broken by the spermatheca contracting. Contracting the spermatheca can dig the sharp spermathecal teeth into the spermatophore.

Males often try to remove rival sperm from their mates using their brushlike genitals. However, oftentimes, this leads to accidental sperm transfer. A. curtula can remove the majority of a rival's sperm from his mate, but this can lead to the beetle accidentally moving his rival’s sperm into a new female mate. In approximately 22% of mating, sperm translocation occurs.

=== Female/Male interactions ===
==== Pheromones ====
Pheromone production functions differently for males and females. Females become sexually mature before males do and often start producing pheromones while still in the egg stage. Males start producing pheromones at about two weeks and emerge from the egg. Females are shown to have a high aphrodisiac pheromone that is released from all parts of their body, while males exhibit only slight pheromones. Unlike other beetles, males also do not exhibit inhibitory pheromones. They do not inhibit the future reproduction of their mate or use pheromones to scare off other males.

Females produce their sex pheromones in specialized glands across their body. These glands create a waxy substance to coat their entire surface. Males and females have different responses to female sex pheromones. Males are calmed, but females are made aggressive. Males often will incidentally exhibit too much female sex pheromone. This could be because they are particularly young, as males start to produce less female sex pheromone as they age. This could also be because they have been starved and are low on resources. However, this mainly impacts mating as males who mate often will also exhibit excess female sex pheromones. Because female sex pheromones are stored in a waxy coating on their surface, this means the wax can rub off and onto males as they are copulating. Females prefer males who have lower amounts of female sex pheromone.

Males who have higher rates of female sex pheromones often have smaller spermatophores and in turn, fertilize less eggs. Furthermore, the high rates of female sex pheromones can indicate a general lack of success in a male. Older, more well-fed males who don’t mate often are seen as preferred traits by females. Males who have low female sex pheromones have to be stronger, as this implies they have fought and won many other males.

==== Courting ====
Males exhibit three different behaviors for mating. The most obvious one is defending a territory and its resources. These are usually older, more mature males. These males will have low levels of female sex pheromone and often fight off other males from their territory and mates.

The secondary tactic is mimicry. These males have high levels of female sex pheromones and roam other male’s territories pretending to be female. This gives them protection from aggressive males and they can avoid conflict. However, this makes them unsuccessful mates as females select against males with high female sex pheromones.

The last tactic males use is satellite. These males wander around another male’s territory and will mate by finding females moving between territories. These males are usually too small to defend their own territory or fight the larger males who protect specific territories. These males also have low levels of female sex pheromones but are often selected against due to their size and age.

==== Copulation, number of mates ====
The female reproductive system is unique to this beetle. The ovaries are the most internal structure, and they are numerous in comparison to other beetles, averaging around 30 ovarioles. This is connected to the genital chamber, in which the spermathecal duct is contained. This spermathecal duct is connected to the spermatheca, but two hardened teeth cover it. The genital chamber is then connected to the vagina and vaginal orifice.

Individual males are discouraged from having large numbers of mates as females select against this trait. However, for this species, whoever has mated the most recently with a female is the most likely individual to father the offspring. This means that males are encouraged to still mate with females even if they have recently copulated. This also means that females can be especially choosy, as each individual can choose to just mate with better males until fertilization occurs.

This ability to be choosier in females is counteracted by male mate-guarding. Mate guarding for A. curtula is more complicated than with other species. Males will firstly fight off other males from their carcass, as having more resources will attract more females. But, A. curtula often also will fight off mates. A male often fights a female off his carcass because it is seen as a breeding spot. Without having access to this breeding spot, his mate is less likely to find another mate before fertilizing her eggs.
