= Aleochara sulcicollis =

Scientific classification
- Kingdom: Animalia
- Phylum: Arthropoda
- Class: Insecta
- Order: Coleoptera
- Suborder: Polyphaga
- Infraorder: Staphyliniformia
- Family: Staphylinidae
- Genus: Aleochara
- Species: A. sulcicollis

Binomial name
- Aleochara sulcicollis Mannerheim, 1843

Species of beetle

Aleochara sulcicollis is a species of rove beetle in the family Staphylinidae. It is found in Central America, North America, and South America. Its larval stage is associated with macroalgae as the species is a parasitoid of kelp flies.
