= Aleochara sculptiventris =

Scientific classification
- Kingdom: Animalia
- Phylum: Arthropoda
- Class: Insecta
- Order: Coleoptera
- Suborder: Polyphaga
- Infraorder: Staphyliniformia
- Family: Staphylinidae
- Genus: Aleochara
- Species: A. sculptiventris

Binomial name
- Aleochara sculptiventris (Casey, 1893)

Species of beetle

Aleochara sculptiventris is a species of rove beetle in the family Staphylinidae. It is found in North America.
