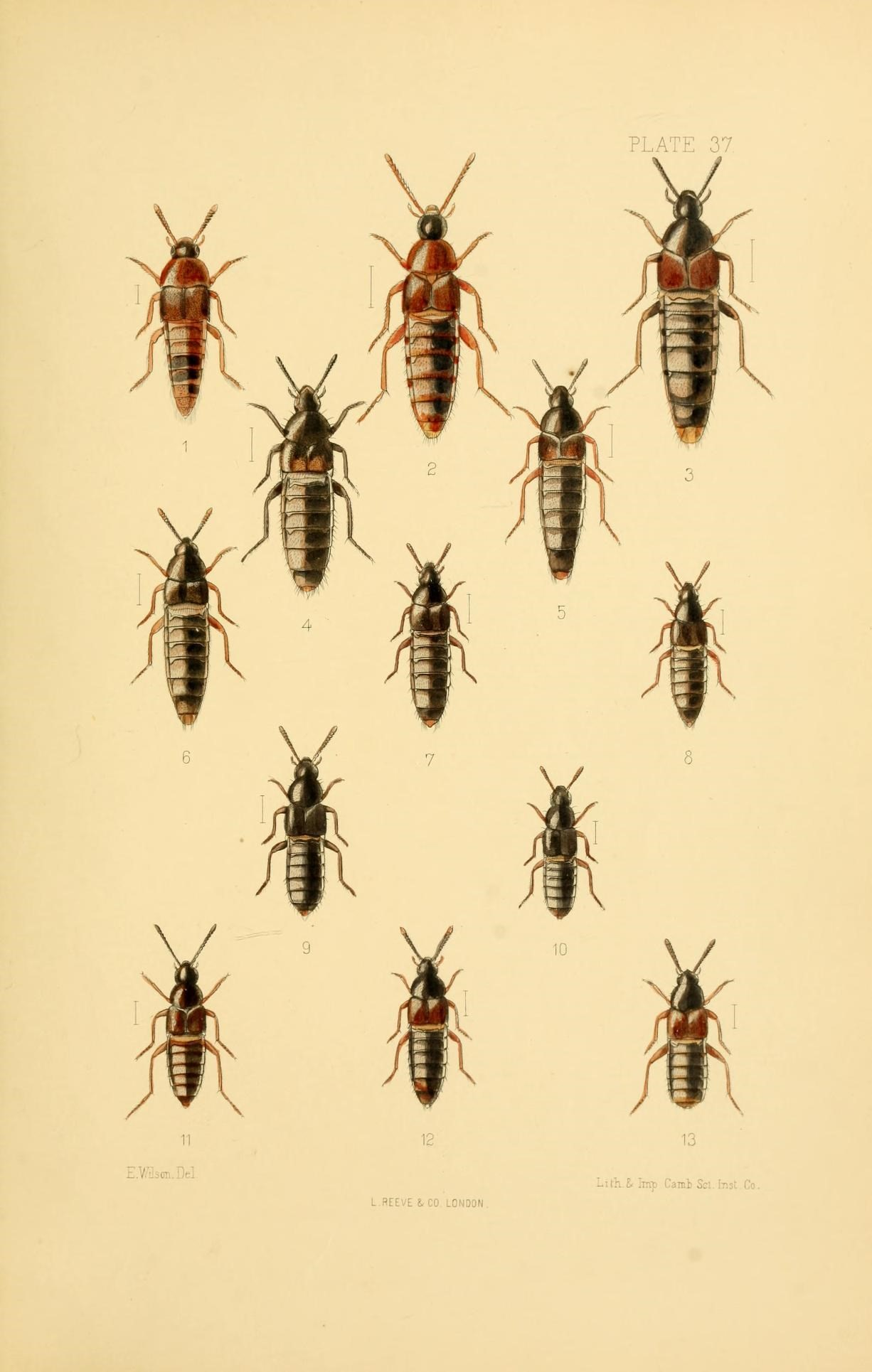
- Aleochara brevipennis figure 6

Scientific classification
- Kingdom: Animalia
- Phylum: Arthropoda
- Class: Insecta
- Order: Coleoptera
- Suborder: Polyphaga
- Infraorder: Staphyliniformia
- Family: Staphylinidae
- Genus: Aleochara
- Species: A. brevipennis

Binomial name
- Aleochara brevipennis Gravenhorst, 1806

= Aleochara brevipennis =

Species of beetle

Aleochara brevipennis is a species of rove beetles native to Europe.
