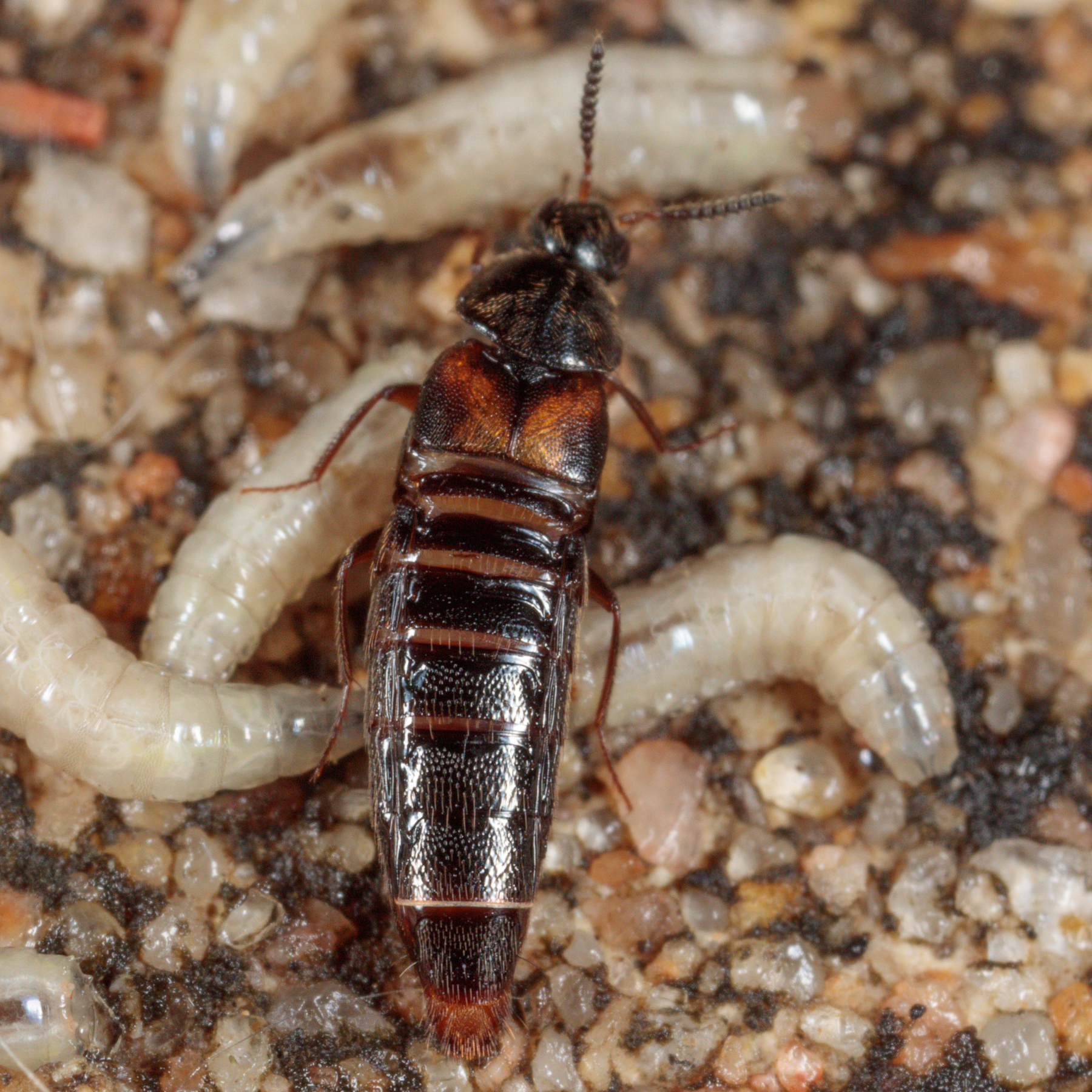

Scientific classification
- Kingdom: Animalia
- Phylum: Arthropoda
- Clade: Pancrustacea
- Class: Insecta
- Order: Coleoptera
- Suborder: Polyphaga
- Infraorder: Staphyliniformia
- Family: Staphylinidae
- Genus: Aleochara
- Species: A. lustrica

Binomial name
- Aleochara lustrica Say, 1834

= Aleochara lustrica =

Species of beetle

Aleochara lustrica is a species of rove beetle in the family Staphylinidae. It is found in Central America and North America.
