= L-797591 =

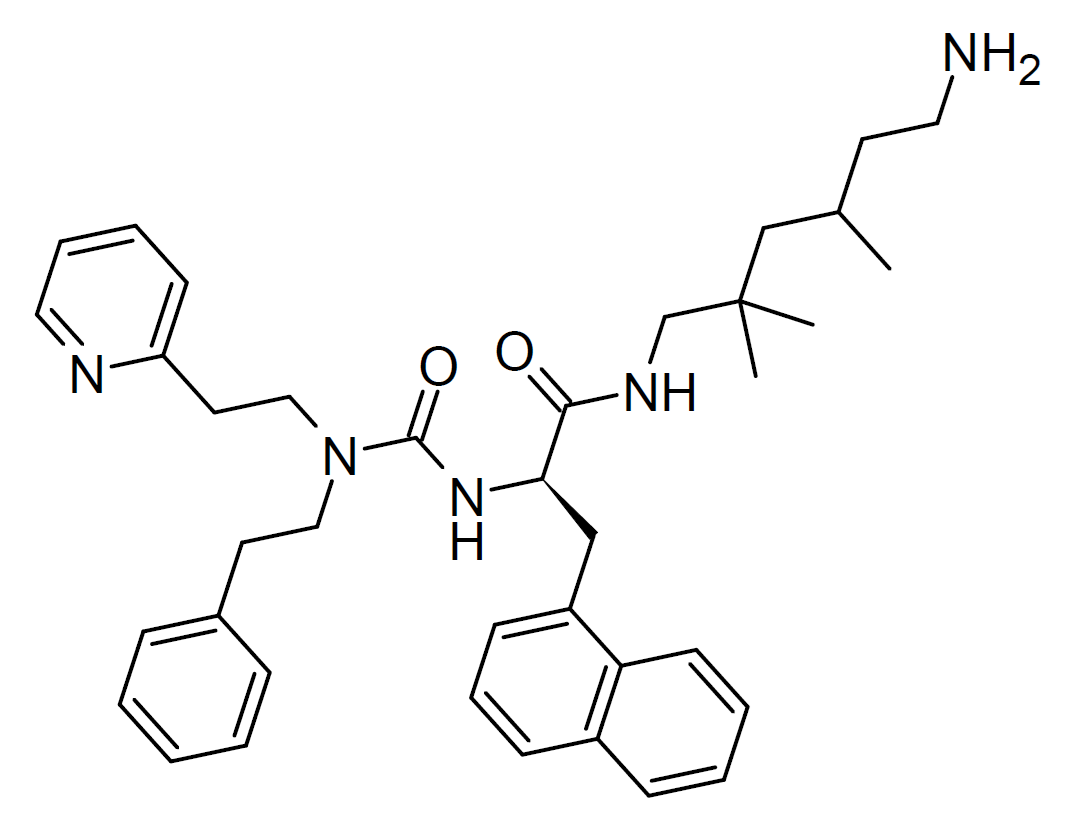

Identifiers
- IUPAC name: (2R)-N-(6-amino-2,2,4-trimethylhexyl)-3-naphthalen-1-yl-2-[[2-phenylethyl(2-pyridin-2-ylethyl)carbamoyl]amino]propanamide
- CAS Number: 217480-24-5
- PubChem CID: 9938757
- IUPHAR/BPS: 2015
- ChemSpider: 8114382

Chemical and physical data
- Formula: C_{38}H_{49}N_{5}O_{2}
- Molar mass: 607.843 g·mol^{−1}
- 3D model (JSmol): Interactive image
- SMILES: CC(CCN)CC(C)(C)CNC(=O)[C@@H](CC1=CC=CC2=CC=CC=C21)NC(=O)N(CCC3=CC=CC=C3)CCC4=CC=CC=N4
- InChI: InChI=1S/C38H49N5O2/c1-29(19-22-39)27-38(2,3)28-41-36(44)35(26-32-16-11-15-31-14-7-8-18-34(31)32)42-37(45)43(24-20-30-12-5-4-6-13-30)25-21-33-17-9-10-23-40-33/h4-18,23,29,35H,19-22,24-28,39H2,1-3H3,(H,41,44)(H,42,45)/t29?,35-/m1/s1; Key:MZKKCMXXGCRPGX-LMZJGDDPSA-N

L-797591 is a chemical compound which acts as an agonist at somatostatin receptor 1. It modulates insulin release and has potential applications in the treatment of diabetes, as well as being used for basic research into the function of the SSTR1 receptor.
