= Somatostatin receptor 1 =

Protein-coding gene in the species Homo sapiens

SSTR1

Identifiers
- Aliases: SSTR1, SRIF-2, SS-1-R, SS1-R, SS1R, Somatostatin receptor 1
- External IDs: OMIM: 182451; MGI: 98327; GeneCards: SSTR1

Gene location (Human)
Chr.	Chromosome 14 (human)
Band	14q21.1	Start	38,207,904 bp
Band	14q21.1	End	38,213,067 bp

Gene location (Mouse)
Chr.	Chromosome 12 (mouse)
Band	12 C1|12 25.61 cM	Start	58,258,558 bp
Band	12 C1|12 25.61 cM	End	58,261,230 bp
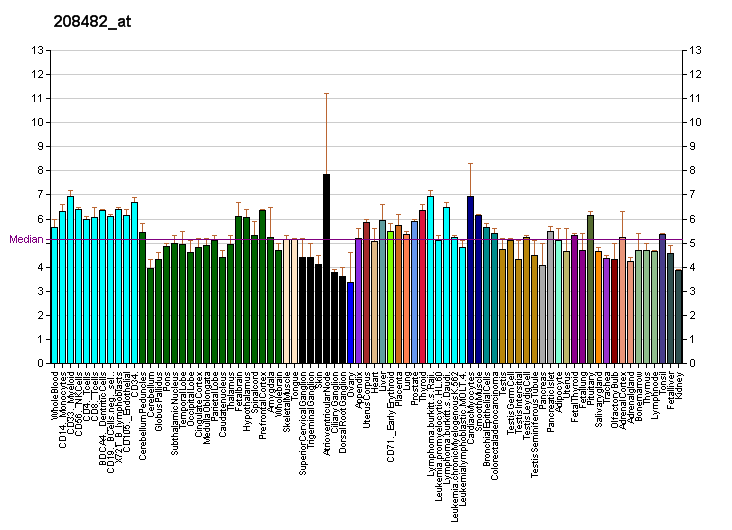
RNA expression pattern
Bgee	Human / Mouse (ortholog); Top expressed in: stromal cell of endometrium; jejunal mucosa; Brodmann area 46; duodenum; prefrontal cortex; middle temporal gyrus; pars reticulata; pars compacta; Brodmann area 23; dorsolateral prefrontal cortex / Top expressed in: dentate gyrus of hippocampal formation granule cell; embryo; superior frontal gyrus; primary visual cortex; ventromedial nucleus; anterior amygdaloid area; primary motor cortex; subiculum; dorsomedial hypothalamic nucleus; arcuate nucleus; More reference expression data
BioGPS	More reference expression data
Gene ontology
Molecular function	G protein-coupled receptor activity; neuropeptide binding; signal transducer activity; somatostatin receptor activity; peptide binding
Cellular component	cytoplasm; integral component of membrane; membrane; plasma membrane; neuron projection; integral component of plasma membrane
Biological process	glutamate receptor signaling pathway; somatostatin signaling pathway; G protein-coupled receptor signaling pathway, coupled to cyclic nucleotide second messenger; cellular response to estradiol stimulus; cerebellum development; spermatogenesis; response to starvation; forebrain development; neuropeptide signaling pathway; signal transduction; negative regulation of cell population proliferation; cellular response to leukemia inhibitory factor; G protein-coupled receptor signaling pathway
Sources:Amigo / QuickGO
Orthologs
Databases	NCBI: entry; OMA: entry
Species	Human	Mouse
Entrez	6751	20605
Ensembl	ENSG00000139874	ENSMUSG00000035431
UniProt	P30872	P30873
RefSeq (mRNA)	NM_001049	NM_009216
RefSeq (protein)	NP_001040	NP_033242
Location (UCSC)	Chr 14: 38.21 – 38.21 Mb	Chr 12: 58.26 – 58.26 Mb
PubMed search
- Wikidata
View/Edit Human	View/Edit Mouse

Somatostatin receptor type 1 is a protein that in humans is encoded by the SSTR1 gene.

== Function ==
Somatostatin acts at many sites to inhibit the release of many hormones and other secretory proteins. The biological effects of somatostatin are mediated by a family of G protein-coupled receptors that are expressed in a tissue-specific manner. The encoded protein is a member of the superfamily of somatostatin receptors having seven transmembrane segments, and is expressed in highest levels in jejunum and stomach.

== Ligands ==
Agonists

- L-797591

Antagonists

- SRA880

== See also ==
- Somatostatin receptor
