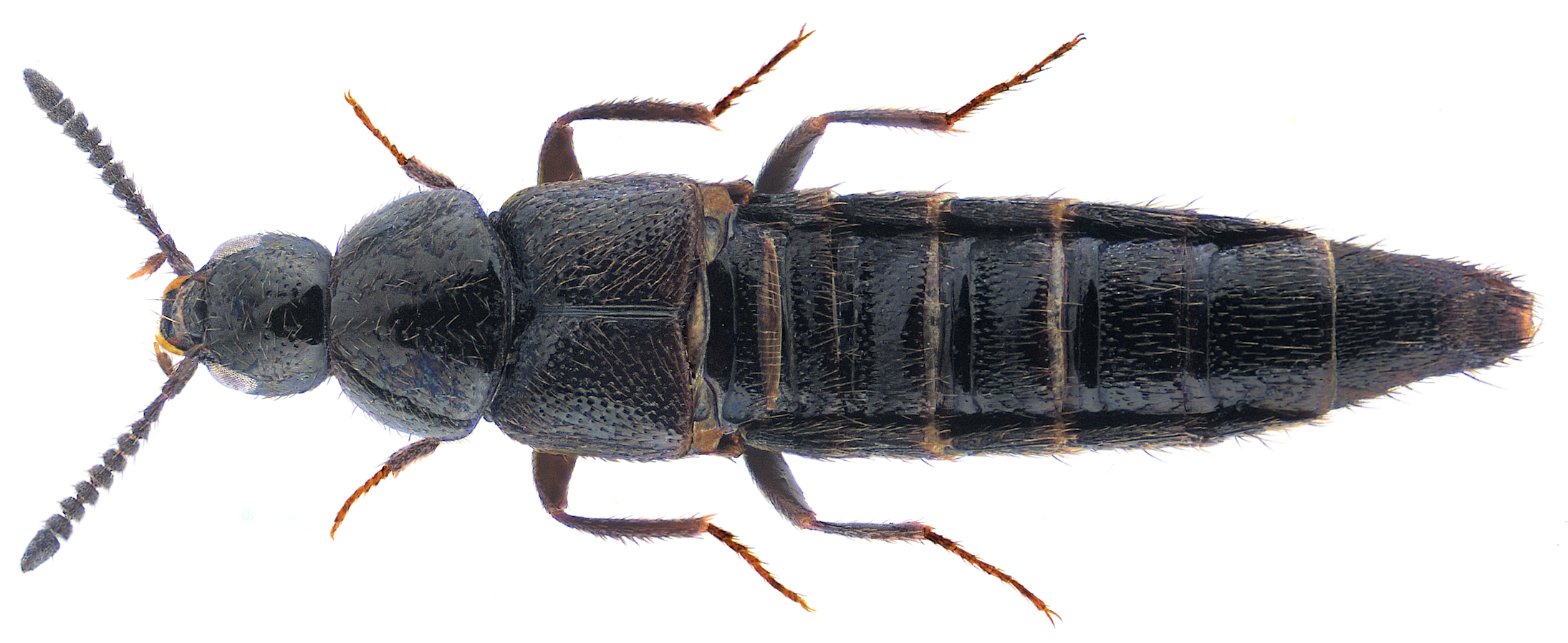

Scientific classification
- Kingdom: Animalia
- Phylum: Arthropoda
- Clade: Pancrustacea
- Class: Insecta
- Order: Coleoptera
- Suborder: Polyphaga
- Infraorder: Staphyliniformia
- Family: Staphylinidae
- Genus: Aleochara
- Species: A. bilineata

Binomial name
- Aleochara bilineata Gyllenhal, 1810

= Aleochara bilineata =

Species of beetle

Aleochara bilineata is a species of rove beetle that lives in sub-tropical and cold tolerant climates throughout the world. This beetle was first biologically described by Wadsworth in 1915. It is used by humans as crop pest control due to the variety of pests it consumes, including caterpillars, mealybugs, mites, maggots. These beetles have a larval phase that occurs over the winter and an adult phase that emerges in the spring. They are often found in moist environments, in compost, or near crops.

== Physical appearance ==
Adult rove beetles are jet black and measure 5–6 millimetres (0.20–0.24 in) long. They have antennae that have large pointed hairs that contain contact chemoreceptors and shorter hairs that contain olfactory receptors. As larvae, these beetles are small and wingless. As adults, they have small, reddish-brown forewings with transparent hindwings folded beneath. When these beetles are attacked, their long abdomen can curve up, giving the appearance of a scorpion.

The eggs of A. bilineata are oval and covered with gelatin-like material which at first is a pale green color but turns darker later on. These eggs also absorb water from their environment and are capable of increasing in volume. Small larvae are pale brown, while larger parasitic larvae are white and are typically found with the host. There is evidence that large larvae have a better fitness than small larvae, as large larvae live longer, walk faster, and find hosts more rapidly than small larvae.

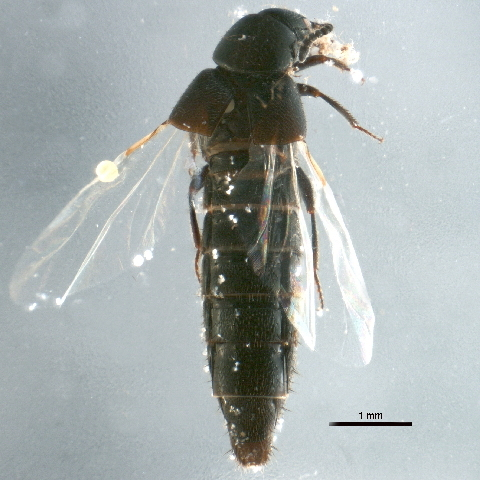
Adult A. bilineata with wings extended

== Life cycle ==
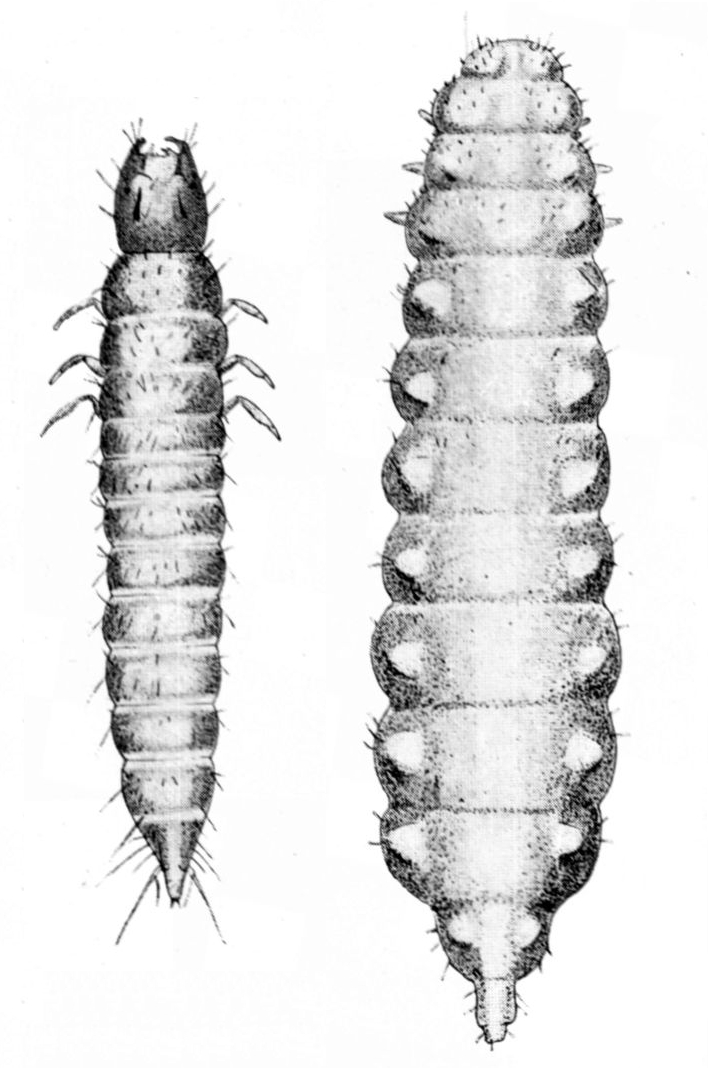

Before winter, female A. bilineata lay tiny, white elliptical eggs, which are deposited in the soil of crops that attract pests. They are capable of laying about 15 eggs per day and average 700 eggs per season. Eggs are deposited in the soil, where larvae hatch in 5 to 10 days. During winter periods, A. bilineata live as parasites inside of a wide variety of host pupae. These hosts are often maggots. Two heavily studied maggots that A. bilineata parasitize are the cabbage maggot and onion maggot. Larvae emerge from their hosts after 30 to 40 days and live as adults for around 40 to 60 days. In total, the life cycle is about 6 weeks.

== Behavior ==
=== Parasitism ===
Unlike other parasitic insects who lay their eggs directly on the host, A. bilineata females lay their eggs in locations likely to harbor parasitic hosts. Females use varying factors to determine clutch size and where they lay their eggs, including the presence of a host and absence of predators. Once the mobile A. bilineata larva emerges from the egg, it then searches the area around it for a suitable fly pupa. These beetle larvae have a limited time (approximately 4 days) to find fly pupae and are only able to parasitize one pupa during their lifetime. Since these larvae are solitary parasitoids, whether or not they are able to find a fly to parasitize has strong implications in whether the beetle larva will develop properly. These beetles' hosts aggregate together around crops, leading to local foraging by A. bilineata. After the beetle locates a suitable host, it gnaws through the puparium of the fly and closes the hole it made by excreting a viscous substance through its anus, which acts as a plug. If there are limited amounts of hosts, these beetles will likely fight to the death in order to secure a host. This species is more likely to attack medium and large fly pupae when given the chance.

=== Oviposition ===
Host location and selection is performed exclusively by young larvae. However, the region in which larvae search in is determined by the mother. Importantly, females will only lay a few eggs if there are no hosts or plants that hosts feed on. When only buried maggots are available, females choose to lay their eggs close to the pupae, but when females are presented a choice between laying eggs on an undamaged plant or close to the pupae, females will choose to lay their eggs on the undamaged plant. This unintuitive pattern can be explained by females having a hard time finding maggots buried in the ground when vegetation covers the ground. Since it is likely that maggots are near the plant to begin with, female beetles hedge their bets and deposit their eggs on plants instead. Between an undamaged plant and a damaged plant, females will choose to deposit their eggs on the damaged plant. These adaptations show that females are highly tuned to lay their eggs in optimal positions. Certain females are able to oviposit small eggs which can serve as food for emerging larvae. The age of the female beetle also affects the number and size of eggs laid.

=== Altruism ===
The benefits of kin recognition in solitary animals are sparse. Despite their solitary nature, A. bilineata larvae are able to discriminate kin and can perform altruistic behavior for their siblings. These larvae discriminate their kin through plugs that obstruct the entrance hole of resident larva in host flies. This association is likely through the viscous substance that the plug is made out of. It is thought that this endogenous recognition mechanism is through a self-referent phenotype matching mechanism, since larvae hatched and maintained in complete isolation were still able to tell kin from non-kin.

One evolutionary reason why A. bilineata display kin recognition could be that there are frequent encounters between larvae and kin-parasitized hosts. Since A. bilineata females lay eggs in clutches, larvae looking for host flies are likely to find flies already parasitized by one of their siblings. It has been found that A. bilineata are more likely to avoid kin parasitized hosts than hosts parasitized by non-kin in situations where there are limited numbers of hosts. This is interpreted as altruistic behavior towards kin since this behavior is beneficial to sibling beetles and also represents a cost to the foraging beetle. As a result, there are higher mortality rates when there are more beetles than hosts and the beetles are also closely related.

Altruistic behavior only seems to be present when A. bilineata are still in the larvae stage. During the adult portion of their life cycle, A. bilineata become cannibalistic, eating their own eggs and attacking other adults when food supplies are low.

=== Infochemicals ===
Once A. bilineata emerge from their hosts, they need to forage for food and mates. These adults are attracted and live around the plants that their prey feed off of, including cabbage and other produce plants. In addition, there is a strong correlation between an increase in weeds and other plants in areas where A. bilineata reside and a decrease in population density of the beetles. A. bilineata are more likely to respond to chemicals given off from an infested prey habitat compared to an uninfested prey habitat. Particularly, A. bilineata respond strongly to water-soluble chemicals originating from the integument of maggot larvae, even when larvae are not present. When food deprived, A. bilineata are more likely to respond to food stimuli rather than stimuli associated with mates and oviposition sites. In summary, A. bilineata use a combination of prey food chemicals and volatiles from the integuments of larvae to determine the best sites for mating, food foraging, and oviposition. It is thought that some of the responses to infochemicals are the result of learning or conditioning of individuals to the attractants produced by maggots.

== Interactions with humans as biocontrol ==
Due to its predation of root maggot pests, A. bilineata are used by farmers as a natural biological control agent against pest populations. These beetles act as a predator in the adult stage and are parasitic during the larval stage, in which they are parasitoids of flies including the cabbage root fly. A problem for farmers who use A. bilineata as a control agent is that A. bilineata's emerges several weeks after maggots emerge during the spring season. As a result, these beetles have been mass-produced by humans and released when maggots start to emerge from their nests. This mass production method produces approximately 10,000 A. bilineata adults per week. This, compounded with adult beetles being able to consume up to five maggot larvae per day, provides for an efficient method to control pests. A drawback of using A. bilineata as pest control is that many pesticides are toxic to them. These pesticides include insect growth regulators and spinosad sprays. As a result, other common insects are often chosen instead, including a different species of rove beetle that is currently commercially available.
