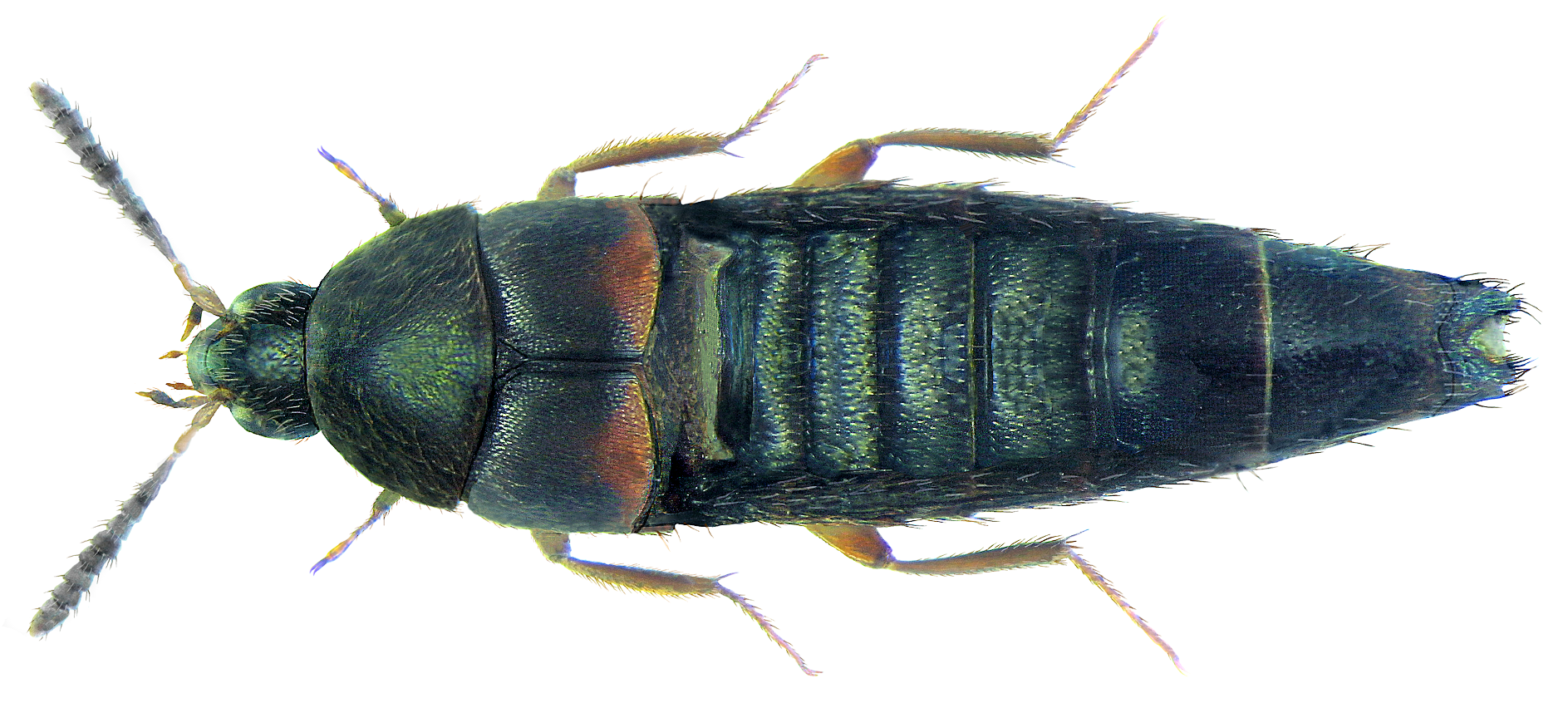
- (male)

Scientific classification
- Kingdom: Animalia
- Phylum: Arthropoda
- Class: Insecta
- Order: Coleoptera
- Suborder: Polyphaga
- Infraorder: Staphyliniformia
- Family: Staphylinidae
- Genus: Aleochara
- Species: A. asiatica

Binomial name
- Aleochara asiatica Kraatz, 1859

Synonyms
- Aleochara japonica Sharp, 1874

= Aleochara asiatica =

Species of beetle

Aleochara asiatica is a species of rove beetle in the family Staphylinidae. It was first described in 1859 by Ernst Gustav Kraatz, who stated it was not uncommon in Ceylon (Sri Lanka). It is found in Asia.
