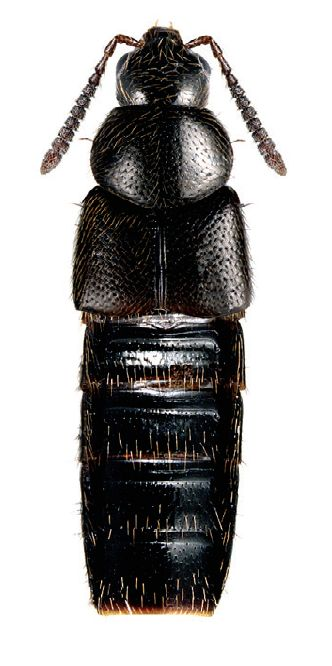
- Aleochara villosa

Scientific classification
- Kingdom: Animalia
- Phylum: Arthropoda
- Class: Insecta
- Order: Coleoptera
- Suborder: Polyphaga
- Infraorder: Staphyliniformia
- Family: Staphylinidae
- Subfamily: Aleocharinae
- Tribe: Aleocharini
- Genus: Aleochara; Gravenhorst, 1802

Diversity
- at least 150 species

= Aleochara =

Genus of beetles

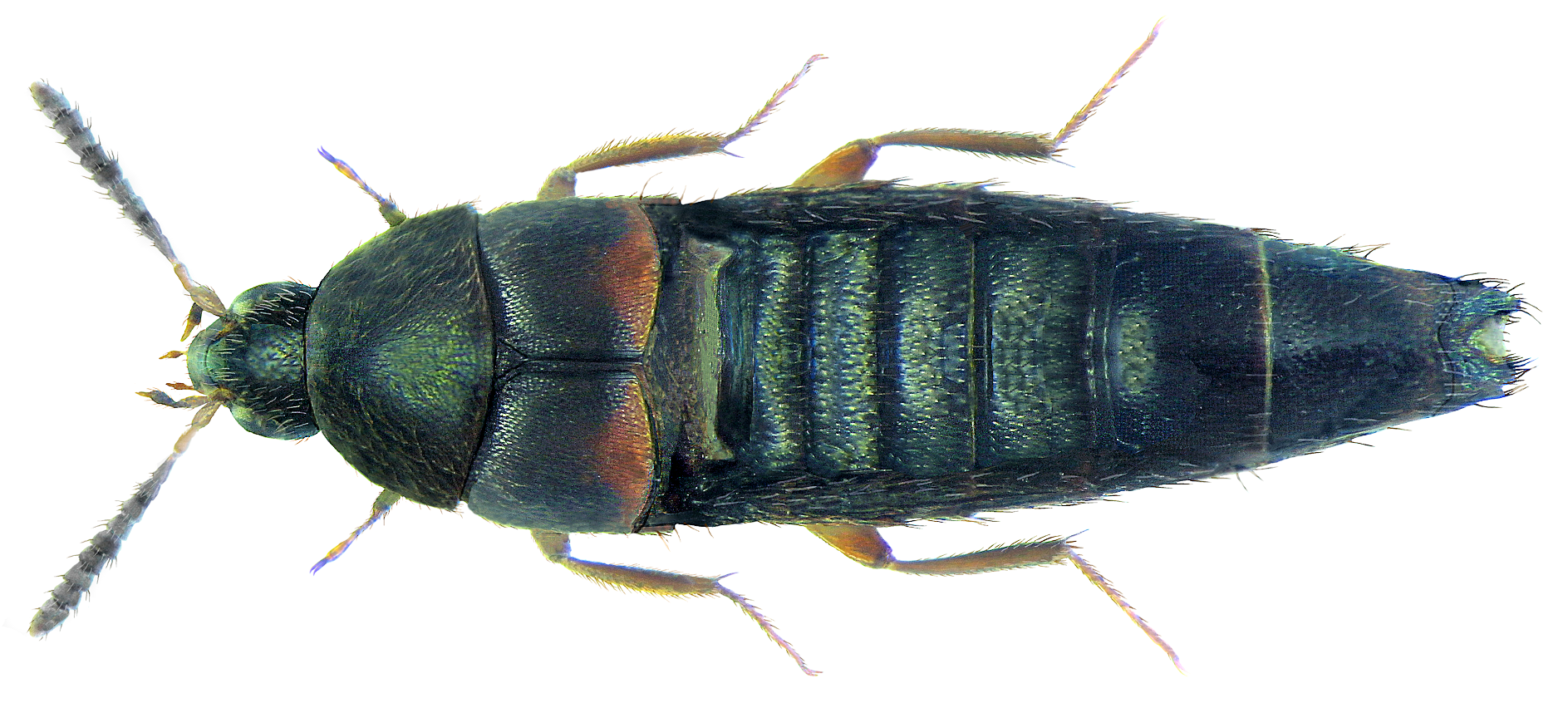
Aleochara asiatica

Aleochara is a genus in the beetle family Staphylinidae, the rove beetles. Larvae of Staphylinidae occur in many assorted ecological roles, most being scavengers, predators or carrion feeders, but the larvae of at least those species of Aleochara whose life histories are known are parasitoids. They feed in the puparia of suitable species of flies, killing the host in the process. Adult Aleochara are predators.

Aleochara are found worldwide except in Antarctica. There are at least 150 and possibly more than 400 species in 16 subgenera. The adults of many species can be found near dung or carrion, commonly feeding on the eggs, larvae, and puparia of various scatophagous and necrophagous Diptera.

The most extensively studied aleocharine rove beetle is Aleochara bilineata Gyllenhal, which is a significant biological control agent against some fly pests (notably Delia spp. in the family Anthomyiidae) of agricultural crops in the mustard and cabbage family Brassicaceae, such as cabbage, rutabaga, canola, and many others.

== Subgenera ==
The genus Aleochara contains at least 150 and possibly more than 400 species, distributed into 16 subgenera. Below is a list of subgenera:

- Heterochara
- Aleochara
- Aidochara
- Euryodma
- Ceranota
- Emplenota
- Triochara
- Maseochara
- Echochara
- Calochara
- Mesochara
- Xenochara
- Rheochara
- Polystomota
- Coprochara
- Megalogastria

== See also ==
- List of Aleochara species

== Other sources ==
- Klimaszewski, J. 1984. A revision of the genus Aleochara Gravenhorst in America north of Mexico (Coleoptera: Staphylinidae, Aleocharinae). Memoirs of the Entomological Society of Canada 129: 1–211.
- Maus, C., B. Mittman, K. Peschke. 1998. Host records of parasitoid Aleochara Gravenhorst species (Coleoptera: Staphylinidae) attacking puparia of cyclorrhapheous Diptera. Deutsche Entomologische Zeitschrift 45: 231–254.
