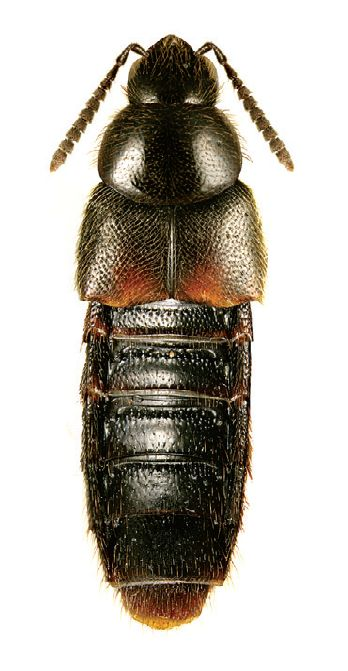
- Aleochara lanuginosa

Scientific classification
- Kingdom: Animalia
- Phylum: Arthropoda
- Clade: Pancrustacea
- Class: Insecta
- Order: Coleoptera
- Suborder: Polyphaga
- Infraorder: Staphyliniformia
- Family: Staphylinidae
- Subfamily: Aleocharinae; Fleming, 1821

Synonyms
- Aleocharidae Fleming, 1821

= Aleocharinae =

Aleocharinae Temporal range: Earliest Cenomanian–Holocene, 98.8–0 Ma

Subfamily of beetles

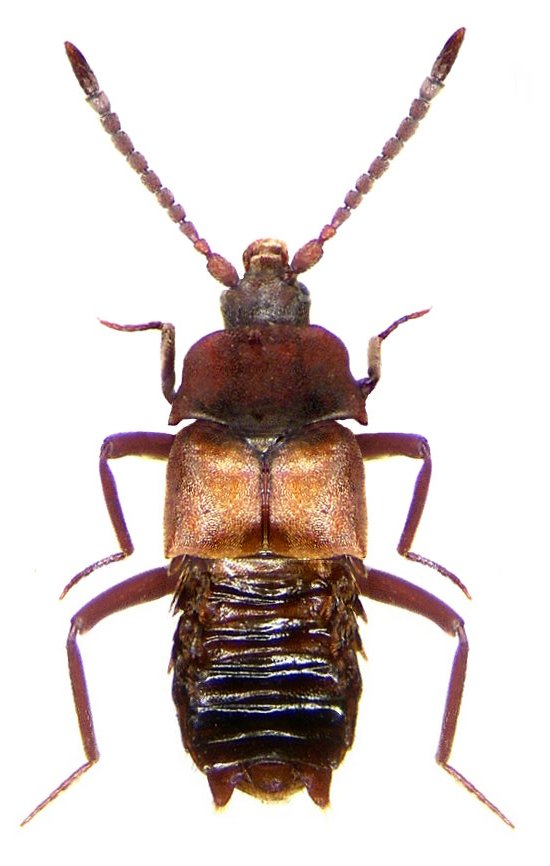
Lomechusa pubicollis lives in the nest of the ant Formica rufa.

The Aleocharinae are one of the largest subfamilies of rove beetles, containing over 12,000 species. Previously subject to large-scale debate whether the subfamily deserved the familial status, it is now considered one of the largest subfamilies of rove beetles.

== Description ==
The Aleocharinae are generally small to minute beetles, as they can reach a maximum length of about 10 mm (0.4 in), but usually they are 3–5 mm (0.12–0.20 in) long, with a few species of 1 mm (0.04 in), among the smallest of beetles. The body is usually slender, often densely and finely punctured; the head is more or less round and the color may be light or dark brown, reddish-brown, or black, sometimes with contrasting colors of red, yellow, and black.

== Anatomy ==
Because of the size of the subfamily, their anatomy is extremely variable. However, a few key features are shared by all rove beetles. All members have antennae with 10 or 11 segments. The antennal insertion is posterior to a line drawn between the anterior margins of the eyes or anterior to a line drawn between the anterior margins of the eyes. The tarsal segments vary from 2-2-2 to 4-5-5.

== Distribution and habitat ==
Rove beetles belonging to this subfamily are distributed throughout the world in almost all terrestrial habitats. They are commonly predators in soil communities and leaf litter, frequently inquilines in ant and termite nests or associated with mushrooms and fungi.

== Ecology ==
This subfamily is common on all terrestrial habitats. It is collected through several methods, including the use of UV light, emergence chambers, sifting, using Berlese organic material, and pitfall traps.

The biology of the subfamily is complex. Many species are highly specialized, thus are prone to extinction. Free-living, parasitic, herbivorous, carnivorous, fungivorous, flying, walking, running, swimming, social, and solitary forms are known, but their life histories are almost unknown at the species level.

== Systematics ==
This subfamily is one of the largest rove beetle subfamilies, containing 52 tribes, over 1000 genera, and over 12000 described species (about 1385 known from North America). This subfamily is a taxonomically difficult groups of beetles.

=== Tribes and selected genera ===
Below is a list of all the tribes and some selected genera.

- Tribe Actocharini Bernhauer & Schubert, 1911
- Tribe Aenictoteratini Kistner, 1993
- Tribe Akatastopsisini Pace, 2000
- Tribe Aleocharini Fleming, 1821
  - Aleochara Gravenhorst, 1802
  - Tinotus Sharp, 1883
- Tribe Antillusini Pace, 2012
- Tribe Athetini Casey, 1910
  - Acrotona Thomson, 1859
  - Actophylla Bernhauer, 1908
  - Alevonota Thomson, 1856
  - Alianta Thomson, 1858
  - Aloconota Thomson, 1858
  - Amischa Thomson, 1858
  - Anopleta Mulsant & Rey, 1874
  - Atheta Thomson, 1858
  - Brundinia Tottenham, 1949
  - Cadaverota Yosii & Sawada, 1976
  - Callicerus Gravenhorst, 1802
  - Coprothassa Thomson, 1859
  - Dacrila Mulsant & Rey, 1874
  - Dadobia Thomson, 1856
  - Dilacra Thomson, 1858
  - Dinaraea Thomson, 1858
  - Disopora Thomson, 1859
  - Dochmonota Thomson, 1859
  - Ecitodaemon Reichensperger, 1939
  - Ecitomorpha Wasmann, 1889
  - Ecitophya Wasmann, 1900
  - Ecitoschneirla Kistner & Jacobson, 1990
  - Ecitosymbia Bruch, 1923
  - Ecitoxenia Wasmann, 1900
  - Geostiba Thomson, 1858
  - Halobrecta Thomson, 1858
  - Hydrosmecta Thomson, 1858
  - Leptostiba Pace, 1985
  - Liogluta Thomson, 1858
  - Lundbergia Muona, 1975
  - Lyprocorrhe Thomson, 1859
  - Nehemitropia Lohse, 1971
  - Ousipalia Des Gozis, 1886
  - Pachnida Mulsant & Rey, 1874
  - Pachyatheta Munster, 1930
  - Paranopleta Brundin, 1954
  - Philhygra Mulsant & Rey, 1873
  - Pycnota Mulsant & Rey, 1874
  - Retteneciton Kistner & Jacobson, 1990
  - Schistoglossa Kraatz, 1856
  - Seeverseciton Kistner & Jacobson, 1990
  - Thamiaraea Thomson, 1858
  - Tomoglossa Kraatz, 1856
  - Trichiusa Casey, 1856
  - Trichomicra Brundin, 1941
- Tribe Australestesini Pace, 2016
- Tribe Autaliini Thomson, 1859
  - Autalia Samouelle, 1819
- Tribe Boreocyphini Klimaszewski & Langor, 2011
- Tribe Cordobanini Bernhauer, 1910
- Tribe Corotocini Fenyes, 1918
  - Abroteles
  - Affinoptochus
  - Australoptochus
  - Austrospirachtha
  - Cavifronexus
  - Coatonachthodes
  - Corotoca
  - Eburniogaster
  - Eburniola
  - Eutermitoptochus
  - Fonsechellus
  - Fulleroxenus
  - Hospitaliptochus
  - Idiogaster
  - Idioptochus
  - Lacessiptochus
  - Leucoptochus
  - Melanoptochus
  - Millotoca
  - Mormellus
  - Nasutimimus
  - Nasutiptochus
  - Nasutitella
  - Neoguinella
  - Neotermitogaster
  - Nigriphilus
  - Oecidiophilus
  - Oideprosoma
  - Paracorotoca
  - Parvidolum
  - Perlinctus
  - Ptocholellus
  - Reginamimus
  - Rhadinoxenus
  - Sphuridaethes
  - Spirachtha
  - Spirachthodes
  - Termella
  - Termitella
  - Termitellodes
  - Termitochara
  - Termitocupidus
  - Termitogaster
  - Termitoiceus
  - Termitoides
  - Termitomimus
  - Termitomorpha
  - Termitonasus
  - Termitonidia
  - Termitophya
  - Termitopithus
  - Termitoptochus
  - Termitoptocinus
  - Termitopula
  - Termitopullus
  - Termitosius
  - Termitosuga
  - Termitosyne
  - Termitosynodes
  - Termitozophilus
  - Termituncula
  - Thyreoxenus
  - Timeparthenus
  - Trachopeplus
  - Tumulipcinus
  - Xenogaster
  - Xenopelta
- Tribe Crematoxenini Mann 1921
  - Beyeria
  - Neobeyeria
- Tribe Cryptonotopsisini Pace, 2003
- Tribe Diestotini Mulsant & Rey, 1871
- Tribe Diglottini Jacobson, 1909
  - Diglotta Champion, 1887
  - Paradiglotta Ashe & Ahn, 2005
- Tribe Digrammini Fauvel, 1900
  - Digrammus Fauvel, 1900
- Tribe Dorylogastrini Wasmann 1916
  - Berghoffia Kistner, 2003
  - Dorylocratus
  - Dorylogaster
- Tribe Dorylomimini Wasmann 1916
  - Dorylocratus
  - Dorylomimus
  - Dorylonannus
  - Jeanneliusa
- Tribe Drepanoxenini Kistner & Watson, 1972
- Tribe Ecitogastrini
  - Ecitogaster
- Tribe Eusteniamorphini Bernhauer & Scheerpeltz, 1926
- Tribe Falagriini Mulsant & Rey, 1873
  - Anaulacaspis Ganglbauer, 1895
  - Borboropora Kraatz, 1862
  - Cordalia Jacobs, 1925
  - Falagria Samouelle, 1819
  - Falagrioma Casey, 1906
  - Flavipennis Cameron, 1920
  - Myrmecocephalus MacLeay, 1871
  - Myrmecopora Saulcy, 1865
- Tribe Feldini Kistner, 1972
- Tribe Geostibini Seevers, 1978
- Tribe Gymnusini Heer, 1839
  - Deinopsis Matthews, 1838
  - Gymnusa Gravenhorst, 1806
- Tribe Himalusini Klimaszewski, Pace & Center, 2010
- Tribe Homalotini Heer, 1839
  - Subtribe Gyrophaenina Kraatz, 1856
    - Agaricochara Kraatz, 1856
    - Encephalus Kirby, 1832
    - Gyrophaena Mannerheim, 1830
  - Subtribe Bolitocharina Thomson, 1859
    - Bolitochara Mannerheim, 1830
    - Euryusa Erichson, 1837
    - Heterota Mulsant & Rey, 1874
    - Leptusa Kraatz, 1856
    - Phymatura J. Sahlberg, 1876
    - Tachyusida Mulsant & Rey, 1872
  - Subtribe Silusina Fenyes, 1918
    - Silusa Erichson, 1837
  - Subtribe Homalotina Heer, 1839
    - Anomognathus Solier, 1849
    - Homalota Mannerheim, 1830
    - Pseudomicrodota Machulka, 1935
    - Thecturota Casey, 1893
  - Subtribe Rhopalocerina Reitter, 1909
    - Clavigera Scriba, 1859
    - Cyphea Fauvel, 1863
- Tribe Hoplandriini Casey, 1910
- Tribe Hygronomini Thomson, 1859
  - Hygronoma Erichson, 1837
- Tribe Hypocyphtini Laporte de Castelnau, 1835 (= Oligotini Thomson, 1859)
  - Anacyptus Horn, 1877
  - Cypha Samouelle, 1819
  - Holobus Solier, 1849
  - Oligota Mannerheim, 1830
- Tribe Leucocraspedini Fenyes, 1921
- Tribe Liparocephalini Fenyes, 1918
- Tribe Lomechusini Fleming, 1821 (= Myrmedoniini Thomson, 1867)
  - Drusilla Samouelle, 1819
  - Lomechusa Gravenhorst, 1806
  - Lomechusoides Tottenham, 1939 (Lomechusoides strumosus)
  - Maschwitzia
  - Meronera
  - Myrmedonota
  - Zyras Stephens, 1835
- Tribe Masuriini Cameron, 1939
- Tribe Mesoporini Cameron, 1959
- Tribe Mimanommatini Wasmann, 1912
- Tribe Mimecitini Wasmann, 1917
- Tribe Myllaenini Ganglbauer, 1895
  - Myllaena Erichson, 1837
- Tribe Oxypodini Thomson, 1859
  - Subtribe Oxypodina Thomson, 1859
    - Acrostiba Thomson, 1858
    - Amarochara Thomson, 1858
    - Calodera Mannerheim, 1830
    - Cephalocousya Lohse, 1971
    - Chanoma Blackwelder, 1952
    - Chilomorpha Krasa, 1914
    - Crataraea Thomson, 1858
    - Drusilla Blackwelder, 1952
    - Dexiogya Thomson, 1858
    - Haploglossa Kraatz, 1856
    - Hygropora Kraatz, 1856
    - Ilyobates Kraatz, 1856
    - Ischnoglossa Kraatz, 1856
    - Mniusa Mulsant & Rey, 1875
    - Ocalea Erichson, 1837
    - Ocyusa Kraatz, 1856
    - Oxypoda Mannerheim, 1830
    - Parocyusa Bernhauer, 1902
    - Pentanota Bernhauer, 1905
    - Phloeopora Erichson, 1837
    - Polylobus
    - Poromniusa Ganglbauer, 1895
    - Pyroglossa Bernhauer, 1901
    - Stichoglossa Fairmaire & Laboulbene, 1856
    - Thiasophila Kraatz, 1856 (Thiasophila angulata)
  - Subtribe Dinardina Mulsant & Rey, 1873
    - Dinarda Samouelle, 1819
  - Subtribe Meoticina Seevers, 1978
    - Meotica Mulsant & Rey, 1873
  - Subtribe Tachyusina Thomson, 1859
    - Brachyusa Mulsant & Rey, 1874
    - Dasygnypeta Lohse, 1974
    - Gnypeta Thomson, 1858
    - Ischnopoda Stephens, 1835
- Tribe Oxypodinini Fenyes, 1921
- Tribe Paglini Newton & Thayer, 1992
- Tribe Paradoxenusini Bruch, 1937
- Tribe Pediculotini Ádám, 1987
- Tribe Philotermitini
    - Philotermes Kraatz, 1857
    - Pseudophilotermes Bernhauer, 1934
- Tribe Phyllodinardini Wasmann, 1916
- Tribe Phytosini Thomson, 1867
  - Arena Fauvel, 1862
  - Phytosus Curtis, 1838
- Tribe Placusini Mulsant & Rey, 1871
  - Placusa Erichson, 1837
- Tribe Pronomaeini Mulsant & Rey, 1873
- Tribe Pseudoperinthini Cameron, 1939
- Tribe Pygostenini Fauvel, 1899
- Tribe Sahlbergiini Kistner, 1993
- Tribe Sceptobiini Seevers, 1978
  - Dinardilla Wasmann, 1901
  - Sceptobius Sharp, 1883
- Tribe Skatitoxenini Kistner & Pasteels, 1969
- Tribe Tachyusini Thomson, C. G., 1859
- Tribe Taxicerini Lohse, 1989
- Tribe Termitodiscini Wasmann, 1904
  - Termitodiscus Wasmann, 1899
  - Termitogerrus Bernhauer, 1932
- Tribe Termitohospitini Seevers, 1941
  - Coptotermocola Kanao, Eldredge & Maruyama, 2012
  - Neotermitosocius Kanao, Eldredge & Maruyama, 2012
  - Termitobra Seevers, 1957
  - Termitohospes Seevers, 1941
  - Termitosocius Seevers, 1941
  - Termitosodalis Seevers, 1941
- Tribe Termitonannini Fenyes, 1918
- Tribe Termitopaediini Seevers, 1957
  - Coatonipulex Kistner, 1977
  - Dioxeuta Sharp, 1899
  - Macrotermophila Kistner, 1973
  - Macrotoxenus Kistner, 1968
  - Paratermitopulex Kistner, 1977
  - Physomilitaris Kistner, 1977
  - Protermitobia Seevers, 1957
  - Termitolinus Wasmann, 1911
  - Termitonda Seevers, 1957
  - Termitopaedia Wasmann, 1911
  - Termitotecna Wasmann, 1912
  - Termitotropha Wasmann, 1899
  - Termozyras Cameron, 1930
- Tribe Termitusini Fenyes, 1918
  - Termitana Fairmaire, 1899
  - Termitoecia Bernhauer, 1920
  - Termitospectrum Mann, 1926
  - Termitusa Wasmann, 1905
  - Termitusodes Pasteels, 1967
- Tribe Trichopseniini LeConte & Horn 1883
- Tribe Trilobitideini Fauvel, 1899
  - Trilobitideus Raffray, 1898

== Gallery ==
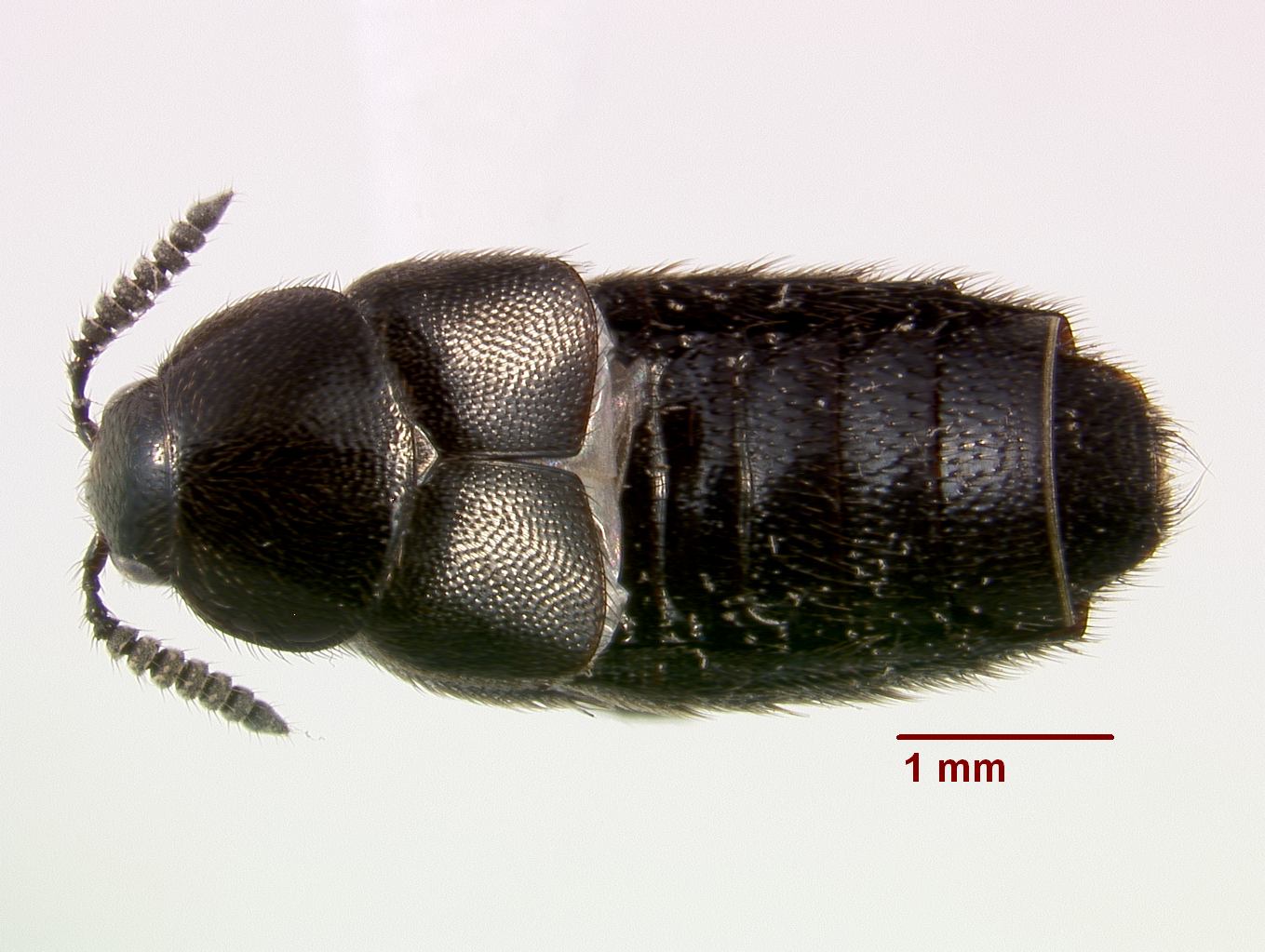
Aleochara lata

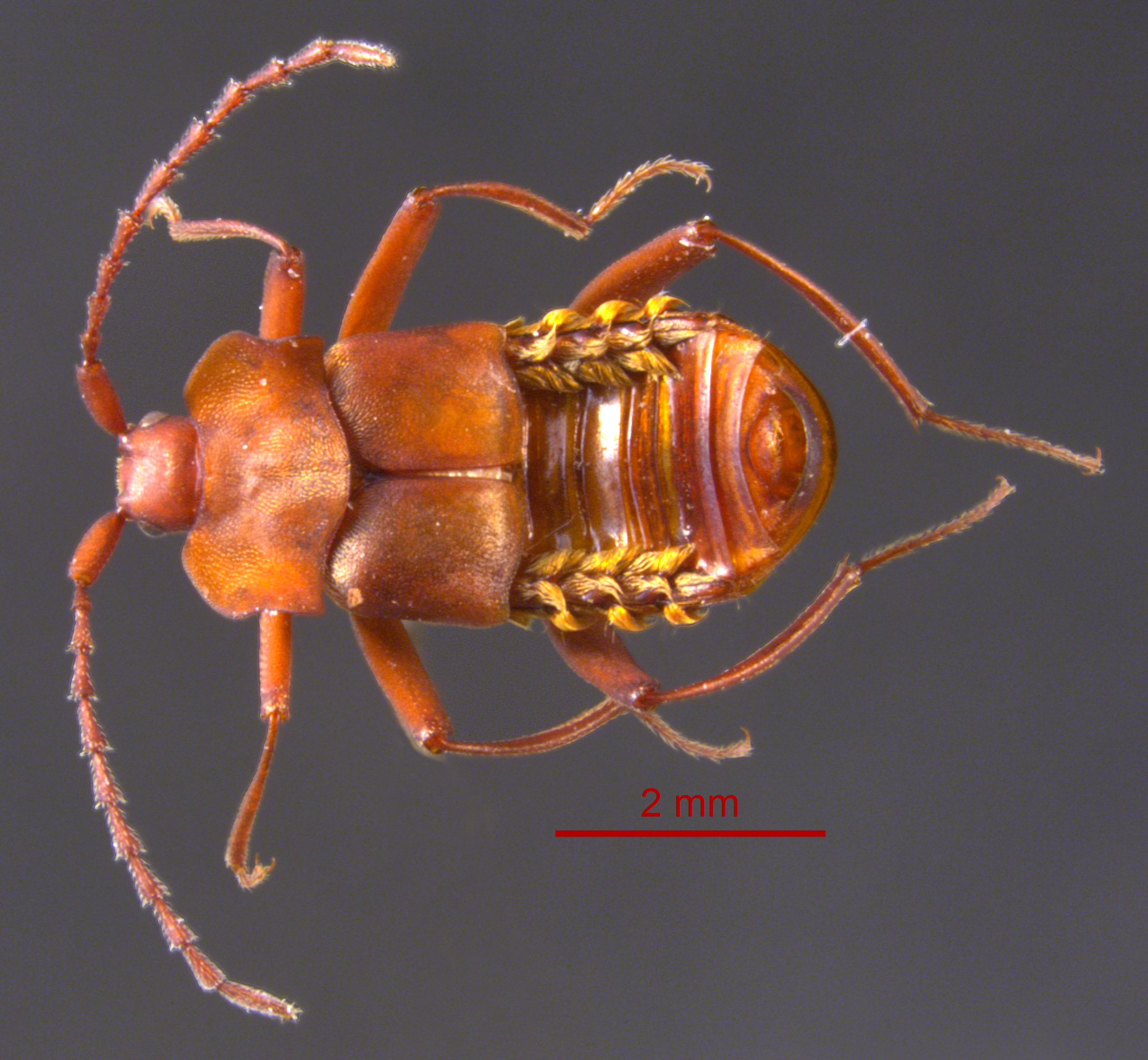
Xenodusa cava

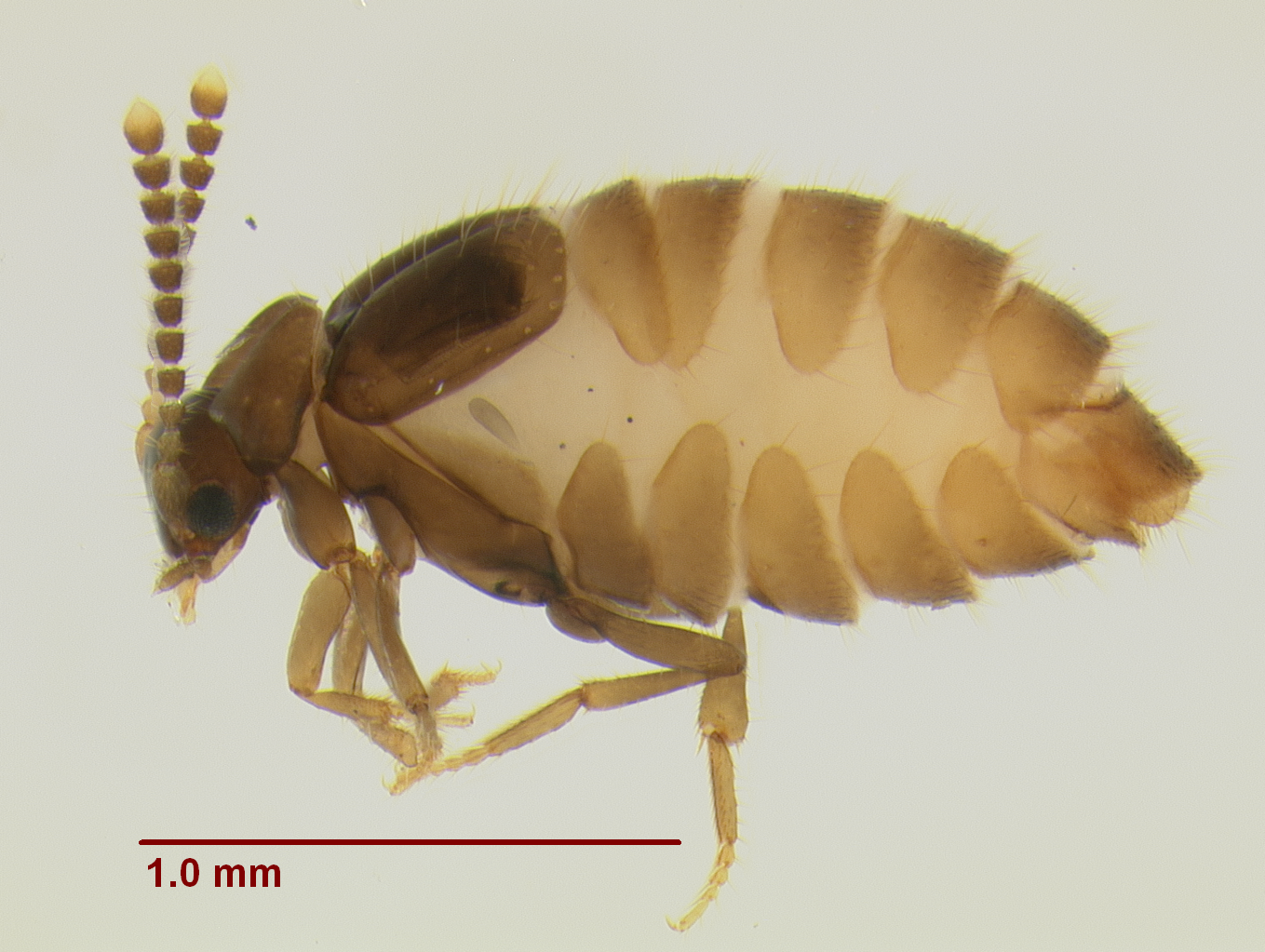
Xenistusa sp.

Bolitochara lucida on fungus

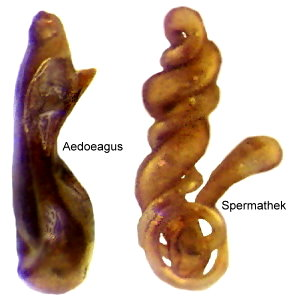
Male (left) and female genitals of Ischnoglossa prolix

== Bibliography ==
- Ferro, M. L., M. L. Gimmel, K. E. Harms, and C. E. Carlton. 2012a. Comparison of the Coleoptera communities in leaf litter and rotten wood in Great Smoky Mountains National Park, USA. Insecta Mundi 259: 1–58.
- Newton, A. F., Jr., M. K. Thayer, J. S. Ashe, and D. S. Chandler. 2001. 22. Staphylinidae Latreille, 1802. p. 272–418. In: R. H. Arnett, Jr., and M. C. Thomas (eds.). American beetles, Volume 1. CRC Press; Boca Raton, Florida. ix + 443 p.
- Ashe, J. S. 2005: Phylogeny of the tachyporine group subfamilies and 'basal' lineages of the Aleocharinae (Coleoptera: Staphylinidae) based on larval and adult characteristics. Systematic entomology, 30: 3–37. doi: 10.1111/j.1365-3113.2004.00258.
- Thomas, J. C. 2009: A preliminary molecular investigation of aleocharine phylogeny (Coleoptera: Staphylinidae). Annals of the Entomological Society of America, 102: 189–195. doi: 10.1603/008.102.0201
