= Dorylomimini =

- Jeanneliusa sp., Togo

Scientific classification
- Kingdom: Animalia
- Phylum: Arthropoda
- Clade: Pancrustacea
- Class: Insecta
- Order: Coleoptera
- Suborder: Polyphaga
- Infraorder: Staphyliniformia
- Family: Staphylinidae
- Subfamily: Aleocharinae
- Tribe: Dorylomimini; Wasmann, 1916

Tribe of beetle

Dorylomimini is a tribe of rove beetles in the subfamily Aleocharinae. It was first described in 1916 by Wasmann. It contains 38 accepted species split between four genera. Recorded observations have taken place in South Africa and Liberia.

The 4 genera assigned to this genus are:

- Dorylocratus Wasmann, 1916
- Dorylomimus Wasmann, 1902
- Dorylonannus Wasmann, 1916
- Jeanneliusa Bernhauer, 1936
