= Cryptonotopsis =

Scientific classification
- Kingdom: Animalia
- Phylum: Arthropoda
- Clade: Pancrustacea
- Class: Insecta
- Order: Coleoptera
- Suborder: Polyphaga
- Infraorder: Staphyliniformia
- Family: Staphylinidae
- Subfamily: Aleocharinae
- Tribe: Cryptonotopsisini; Pace, 2003
- Genus: Cryptonotopsis; Pace, 2003
- Species: C. rougemonti

Binomial name
- Cryptonotopsis rougemonti Pace, 2003

Tribe of moths

Cryptonotopsisini is a tribe of rove beetles in the subfamily Aleocharinae. It was first described in 2003 by Pace. It contains one genus, Cryptonotopsis, with one species, Cryptonotopsis rougemonti.
