= Mimecitini =

Scientific classification
- Kingdom: Animalia
- Phylum: Arthropoda
- Clade: Pancrustacea
- Class: Insecta
- Order: Coleoptera
- Suborder: Polyphaga
- Infraorder: Staphyliniformia
- Family: Staphylinidae
- Subfamily: Aleocharinae
- Tribe: Mimecitini; Wasmann, 1909

Tribe of beetles

Mimecitini is a tribe of rove beetles in the subfamily Aleocharinae. It was first described by Wasmann in 1909. It contains 4 genera with 25 species.

== Genera ==
- Labidopullina
- Leptanillophilina
- Mimecitina
- Mimonillina
