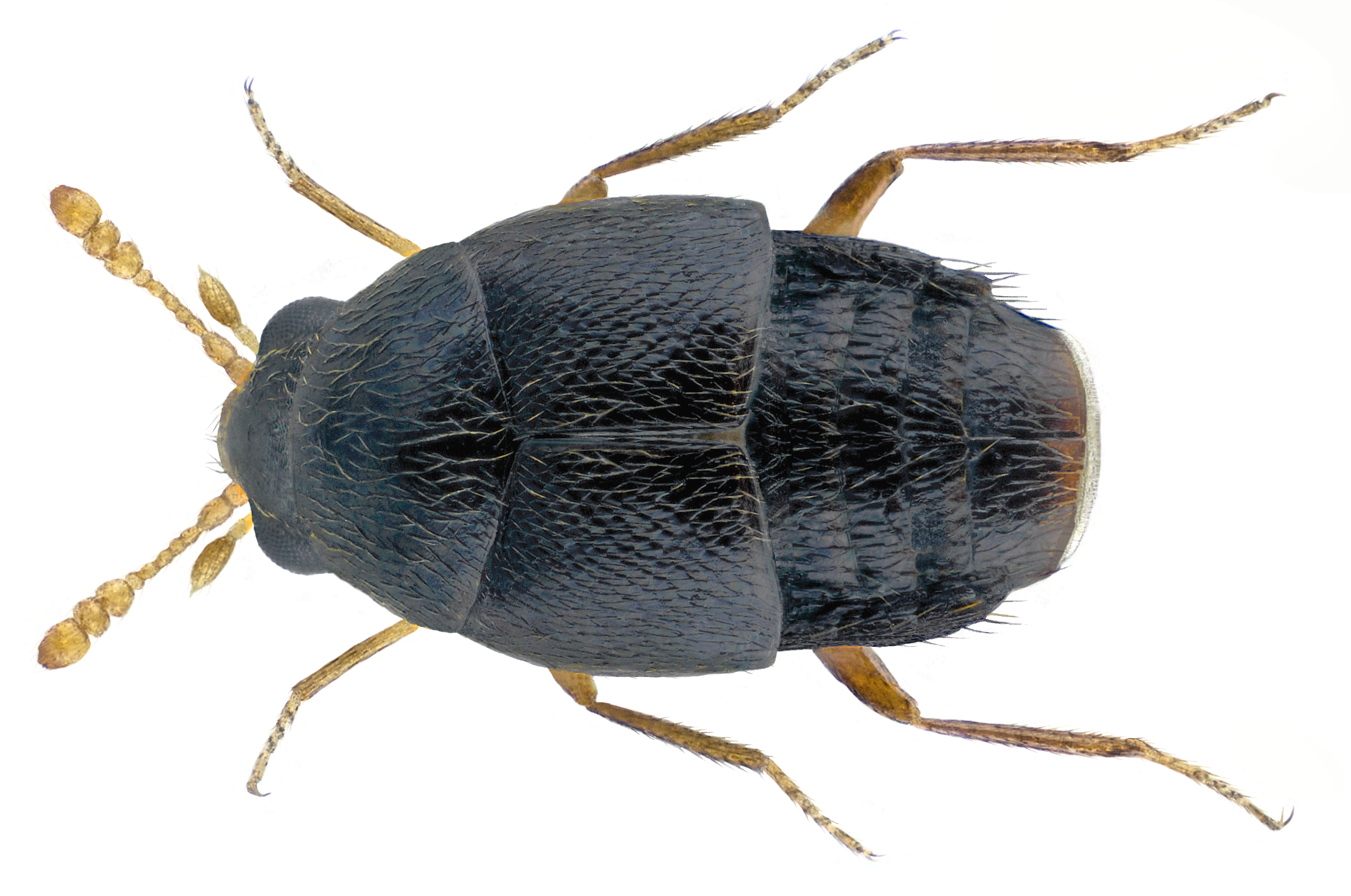
- Holobus flavicornis

Scientific classification
- Kingdom: Animalia
- Phylum: Arthropoda
- Class: Insecta
- Order: Coleoptera
- Suborder: Polyphaga
- Infraorder: Staphyliniformia
- Family: Staphylinidae
- Subfamily: Aleocharinae
- Genus: Holobus; Solier, 1849

= Holobus =

Genus of beetles

Holobus is a genus of beetles belonging to the family Staphylinidae.

The species of this genus are found in Europe, southern Africa and the Americas.

== Selected species ==
- Holobus abruptus (Casey, 1911)
- Holobus albidicornis (Bernhauer, 1923)
- Holobus flavicornis (Lacordaire, 1835)
