= Hygronomini =

Scientific classification
- Kingdom: Animalia
- Phylum: Arthropoda
- Clade: Pancrustacea
- Class: Insecta
- Order: Coleoptera
- Suborder: Polyphaga
- Infraorder: Staphyliniformia
- Family: Staphylinidae
- Subfamily: Aleocharinae
- Tribe: Hygronomini; Thomson, 1859

Tribe of beetles

Hygronomini is a tribe of rove beetles in the subfamily Aleocharinae. It was first described by C.G. Thomson in 1859. It contains 4 genera with 44 species.

== Genera ==
- Cryptocompsus
- Eymekesina
- Hygronomia
- Saphoglossina
