= Diestotini =

Scientific classification
- Kingdom: Animalia
- Phylum: Arthropoda
- Clade: Pancrustacea
- Class: Insecta
- Order: Coleoptera
- Suborder: Polyphaga
- Infraorder: Staphyliniformia
- Family: Staphylinidae
- Subfamily: Aleocharinae
- Tribe: Diestotini; Mulsant & Rey, 1871

Diestotini is a tribe of rove beetles in the subfamily Aleocharinae. It was first described in 1871 by Mulsant and Rey. It contains 344 accepted species, split between 7 genera. Observations of species in the tribe Diestotini have been made across the world, but the majority of observations have been made in Costa Rica, Venezuela, Honduras, Panama, and Guatemala.

== Genera ==
- Diestota
- Eudera
- Gansia
- Gansiella
- Parasilusa
- Plesiomalota
- Tachiona
