= Pediculota =

Scientific classification
- Kingdom: Animalia
- Phylum: Arthropoda
- Clade: Pancrustacea
- Class: Insecta
- Order: Coleoptera
- Suborder: Polyphaga
- Infraorder: Staphyliniformia
- Family: Staphylinidae
- Subfamily: Aleocharinae
- Tribe: Pediculotini; Ádám, 1987
- Genus: Pediculota; Ádám, 1987
- Species: P. montandoni

Binomial name
- Pediculota montandoni (Roubal, 1909)

Genus of beetles

Pediculotini is a tribe of rove beetles in the subfamily Aleocharinae. It was first described by Ádám in 1987. It contains one genera, Pediculota, with one species, Pediculota montandoni.
