= Diglottini =

Scientific classification
- Kingdom: Animalia
- Phylum: Arthropoda
- Clade: Pancrustacea
- Class: Insecta
- Order: Coleoptera
- Suborder: Polyphaga
- Infraorder: Staphyliniformia
- Family: Staphylinidae
- Subfamily: Aleocharinae
- Tribe: Diglottini; Jakobson, 1909

Diglottini is a tribe of rove beetles in the subfamily Aleocharinae. It was first described by Jakobson in 1909. It contains 9 accepted species split between two genera. The majority of recorded observations have been in the United Kingdom, the Netherlands, and France.

== Genera ==
- Diglotta
- Paradiglotta
