= Dorylogastrini =

Scientific classification
- Kingdom: Animalia
- Phylum: Arthropoda
- Clade: Pancrustacea
- Class: Insecta
- Order: Coleoptera
- Suborder: Polyphaga
- Infraorder: Staphyliniformia
- Family: Staphylinidae
- Subfamily: Aleocharinae
- Tribe: Dorylogastrini; Wasmann, 1916

Dorylogastrini is a tribe of rove beetles in the subfamily Aleocharinae. It was first described by Wasmann in 1916. It contains 2 genera, and 13 accepted species.

== Genera and species ==
- Berghoffia
  - Berghoffia spectabilis
- Dorylogaster
  - Dorylogaster amicus
  - Dorylogaster boultoni
  - Dorylogaster clavicornis
  - Dorylogaster constrictor
  - Dorylogaster kenyensis
  - Dorylogaster kohli
  - Dorylogaster longpipes
  - Dorylogaster machadoi
  - Dorylogaster seeversi
  - Dorylogaster tanzaniensis
  - Dorylogaster zeder
  - Dorylogaster zombaensis
