= Boreocyphini =

Boreocyphini is a tribe of rove beetles in the sub family Aleocharinae. It was first described by Klimaszewski and Langor in 2011. There is only one genus, Boreocypha, which contains one species, Boreocypha websteri. This beetle is very small, only around 2mm long. It has been observed in Canada and Alaska.
