= Akatastopsis =

Scientific classification
- Kingdom: Animalia
- Phylum: Arthropoda
- Clade: Pancrustacea
- Class: Insecta
- Order: Coleoptera
- Suborder: Polyphaga
- Infraorder: Staphyliniformia
- Family: Staphylinidae
- Subfamily: Aleocharinae
- Tribe: Akatastopsisini; Pace, 2000
- Genus: Akatastopsis; Pace, 2000
- Species: A. papuana

Binomial name
- Akatastopsis papuana Pace, 2000

Genus of insects

Akatastopsisini is a tribe of rove beetles in the subfamily Aleocharinaes. It was first described by Pace in 2000. There is one genus, Akatastopsis, with one species, Akatastopsis papuana.
