= Termitohospitini =

Scientific classification
- Kingdom: Animalia
- Phylum: Arthropoda
- Clade: Pancrustacea
- Class: Insecta
- Order: Coleoptera
- Suborder: Polyphaga
- Infraorder: Staphyliniformia
- Family: Staphylinidae
- Subfamily: Aleocharinae
- Tribe: Termitohospitini; Seevers, 1941

Termitohospitini is a tribe of rove beetles in the family Staphylinidae. It was first described in 1941 by Seevers. It contains 39 accepted species split between 2 subtribes, and 14 genera. Observations of members of Termitohospitini have been made in Australia, Bolivia, Costa Rica, Guyana, Suriname, Taiwan, Japan, Fiji, and Panama.

== Subtribes and genera ==
Subtribe: Hetairotermitina

- Coptophysa
- Coptophysella
- Coptotermocola
- Coptoxenus
- Hetairotermes
- Japanophilus
- Sinophilus
- Termitobra

Subtribe: Termitohospitina

- Blapticoxenus
- Neotermitosocius
- Paratermitosocius
- Termitohospes
- Termitosocius
- Termitosodalis
