= Himalusini =

Scientific classification
- Kingdom: Animalia
- Phylum: Arthropoda
- Clade: Pancrustacea
- Class: Insecta
- Order: Coleoptera
- Suborder: Polyphaga
- Infraorder: Staphyliniformia
- Family: Staphylinidae
- Subfamily: Aleocharinae
- Tribe: Himalusini; Klimaszewski, Pace & Center, 2010

Himalusini is a tribe of rove beetles in the subfamily Aleocharinae. It was first described by Klimaszewski, Pace, and Center in 2010. It contains 3 genera with 5 species. Data of recorded observations is limited, although observations have been made in Thailand and Japan.

== Genera and species ==
- Himalusa
  - Himalusa annapurnensis
  - Himalusa thailandensis
- Protinodes
  - Protinodes annapurensis
  - Protinodes puncticollis
- Sinanarchusa
  - Sinarachusa daxuensis
