= Antillusa =

Scientific classification
- Kingdom: Animalia
- Phylum: Arthropoda
- Clade: Pancrustacea
- Class: Insecta
- Order: Coleoptera
- Suborder: Polyphaga
- Infraorder: Staphyliniformia
- Family: Staphylinidae
- Subfamily: Aleocharinae
- Tribe: Antillusini; Pace, 2012
- Genus: Antillusa; Pace, 2012
- Species: A. dominicana

Binomial name
- Antillusa dominicana Pace, 2012

Genus of insects

Antilusini is a tribe in of rove beetles in the subfamily Aleocharinae. It has one genus, Antillusa, and one species, Antillusa dominicana. It was first described by Pace, R. in 2012.
