= Skatitoxenus =

Scientific classification
- Kingdom: Animalia
- Phylum: Arthropoda
- Clade: Pancrustacea
- Class: Insecta
- Order: Coleoptera
- Suborder: Polyphaga
- Infraorder: Staphyliniformia
- Family: Staphylinidae
- Tribe: Skatitoxenini; Kistner & Pasteels, 1969
- Genus: Skatitoxenus; Kistner & Pasteels, 1969

Genus of beetles

Skatitoxenus is a genus of rove beetles in the subfamily Aleocharinae. It is the only genus in the tribe Skatitoxenini and was first described by Kistner and Pasteels in 1969. The genus contains two species, Skatitoxenus coatoni and Skatitoxenus pretoriusi.
