= Anacyptus =

Scientific classification
- Kingdom: Animalia
- Phylum: Arthropoda
- Class: Insecta
- Order: Coleoptera
- Suborder: Polyphaga
- Infraorder: Staphyliniformia
- Family: Staphylinidae
- Subfamily: Aleocharinae
- Genus: Anacyptus; Horn, 1877

Genus of beetles

Anacyptus is a genus of rove beetles in the family Staphylinidae. There is one described species in Anacyptus, A. testaceus.
