= Eusteniamorphini =

Scientific classification
- Kingdom: Animalia
- Phylum: Arthropoda
- Clade: Pancrustacea
- Class: Insecta
- Order: Coleoptera
- Suborder: Polyphaga
- Infraorder: Staphyliniformia
- Family: Staphylinidae
- Subfamily: Aleocharinae
- Tribe: Eusteniamorphini; Bernhauer & Scheerpeltz, 1926

Tribe of beetles

Eusteniamorphini is a tribe of rove beetles in the subfamily Aleocharinae. It was first described by Bernhauer and Scheerpeltz in 1926. It contains three genera and 93 accepted species. The majority of recovered observations of members of Eusteniamorphini have taken place in Suriname, Kenya, and French Guiana.

== Genera ==
- Eusteniamorpha
- Eustenidia
- Pseudeustenia
