= Paradoxenusa =

Scientific classification
- Kingdom: Animalia
- Phylum: Arthropoda
- Clade: Pancrustacea
- Class: Insecta
- Order: Coleoptera
- Suborder: Polyphaga
- Infraorder: Staphyliniformia
- Family: Staphylinidae
- Subfamily: Aleocharinae
- Tribe: Paradoxenusini; Bruch, 1937
- Genus: Paradoxenusa; Bruch, 1937
- Species: P. silvestrii

Binomial name
- Paradoxenusa silvestrii Bruch, 1937

Genus of beetles

Paradoxenusini is a tribe of rove beetles in the subfamily Aleocharinae. It was first described by Bruch in 1937. It contains one genus, Paradoxenusa, with one species, Paradoxenusa silvestrii. Most recorded observations have been made in Guyana, Costa Rica, Peru, Argentina, and Panama.
