= Sahlbergiini =

Scientific classification
- Kingdom: Animalia
- Phylum: Arthropoda
- Clade: Pancrustacea
- Class: Insecta
- Order: Coleoptera
- Suborder: Polyphaga
- Infraorder: Staphyliniformia
- Family: Staphylinidae
- Subfamily: Aleocharinae
- Tribe: Sahlbergiini; Kistner, 1993

Sahlbergiini is a tribe of rove beetles in the subfamily Aleocharinae. It was first described by Kistner in 1993. It contains 4 genera with 9 species. Recorded observations of members of Sahlbergiini have been made in Kenya, Liberia, and Malaysia.

== Genera and species ==
- Leoblius
  - Loeblius nepalensis
- Malayleoblius
  - Malayloeblius borneensis
  - Malayloeblius laoticus
  - Malayloeblius sausai
  - Malayloeblius tensus
- Parasahlbergius
  - Parasahlbergius gotwaldi
  - Parasahlbergius liberiae
- Sahlbergius
  - Sahlbergius aenictophilus
  - Sahlbergius mirabilis
