= Feldini =

Scientific classification
- Kingdom: Animalia
- Phylum: Arthropoda
- Clade: Pancrustacea
- Class: Insecta
- Order: Coleoptera
- Suborder: Polyphaga
- Infraorder: Staphyliniformia
- Family: Staphylinidae
- Subfamily: Aleocharinae
- Genus: Feldini; Kistner, 1972

Feldini is a tribe of rove beetles in the subfamily Aleocharinae. It was first described by Kistner in 1972. It contains 10 genera and 28 species.

== Genera ==
- Discuspidoxenus
- Dicuspiphilus
- Dlefa
- Fisiphila
- Lefda
- Pericapritoxenus
- Perilefda
- Tekalita
- Termitobaena
- Termitobiella
