= Leucocraspedini =

Scientific classification
- Kingdom: Animalia
- Phylum: Arthropoda
- Clade: Pancrustacea
- Class: Insecta
- Order: Coleoptera
- Suborder: Polyphaga
- Infraorder: Staphyliniformia
- Family: Staphylinidae
- Subfamily: Aleocharinae
- Tribe: Leucocraspedini; Fenyes, 1921

Tribe of moths

Leucocraspedini is a tribe of rove beetles in the subfamily Aleocharinae. It was described in 1921 by Fenyes. It contains 106 accepted species in one genus, Leucocraspedum. Most observations have been made in Australia and Papua New Guinea.

== Species ==
- Leucocraspedum africanum
- Leucocraspedum afrorum
- Leucocraspedum alularum
- Leucocraspedum anaticula
- Leucocraspedum andrewesi
- Leucocraspedum anguineatheca
- Leucocraspedum antennaria
- Leucocraspedum antsahatsakense
- Leucocraspedum asymmetricum
- Leucocraspedum audax
- Leucocraspedum baoshanense
- Leucocraspedum bicolor
- Leucocraspedum bicolorides
- Leucocraspedum biguttae
- Leucocraspedum bormense
- Leucocraspedum cacuminum
- Leucocraspedum callicorne
- Leucocraspedum collicornoides
- Leucocraspedum chinense
- Leucocraspedum claripygum
- Leucocraspedum conicollis
- Leucocraspedum contractulum
- Leucocraspedum contrarium
- Leucocraspedum cryptocephalum
- Leucocraspedum dilatatiapex
- Leucocraspedum dilutum
- Leucocraspedum directum
- Leucocraspedum distinctum
- Leucocraspedum diuremnense
- Leucocraspedum divisum
- Leucocraspedum dubium
- Leucocraspedum elegantulum
- Leucocraspedum excellens
- Leucocraspedum fakfakense
- Leucocraspedum fasciatipenne
- Leucocraspedum ferrugineum
- Leucocraspedum flagelliferum
- Leucocraspedum fugitivum
- Leucocraspedum fuscatum
- Leucocraspedum grootaerti
- Leucocraspedum hamifer
- Leucocraspedum hartmanni
- Leucocraspedum horni
- Leucocraspedum incisicauda
- Leucocraspedum intermedium
- Leucocraspedum javanorum
- Leucocraspedum karnyi
- Leucocraspedum lamelliferum
- Leucocraspedum langtangense
- Leucocraspedum lemurianum
- Leucocraspedum limbatum
- Leucocraspedum longisetosum
- Leucocraspedum lungens
- Leucocraspedum luzonicum
- Leucocraspedum malgascium
- Leucocraspedum mimanaticula
- Leucocraspedum mimopapuanum
- Leucocraspedum minus
- Leucocraspedum minutum
- Leucocraspedum moluccanum
- Leucocraspedum muliense
- Leucocraspedum myllaenoides
- Leucocraspedum nalcaense
- Leucocraspedum nankunense
- Leucocraspedum nechamifer
- Leucocraspedum nepalense
- Leucocraspedum nigromaculatum
- Leucocraspedum nilgiriense
- Leucocraspedum notaticorne
- Leucocraspedum obliquum
- Leucocraspedum obscurum
- Leucocraspedum occultum
- Leucocraspedum orousseti
- Leucocraspedum osellai
- Leucocraspedum paniaense
- Leucocraspedum papuanum
- Leucocraspedum persimile
- Leucocraspedum phatoense
- Leucocraspedum philippinum
- Leucocraspedum philocallicorne
- Leucocraspedum pilosellum
- Leucocraspedum plumbeum
- Leucocraspedum pulchellum
- Leucocraspedum riedeli
- Leucocraspedum robustum
- Leucocraspedum rougemonti
- Leucocraspedum rufotestaceum
- Leucocraspedum rufum
- Leucocraspedum scorpio
- Leucocraspedum sidneense
- Leucocraspedum sinicum
- Leucocraspedum sinofestivum
- Leucocraspedum sinuatides
- Leucocraspedum sinuatum
- Leucocraspedum spirasferum
- Leucocraspedum strictum
- Leucocraspedum sulawesicolum
- Leucocraspedum taiwanense
- Leucocraspedum terminale
- Leucocraspedum tronqueti
- Leucocraspedum ventriosatheca
- Leucocraspedum vietnamense
- Leucocraspedum vigilans
- Leucocraspedum xiaoxiangense
- Leucocraspedum yao
- Leucocraspedum zuluense
