= Termitusini =

Scientific classification
- Kingdom: Animalia
- Phylum: Arthropoda
- Clade: Pancrustacea
- Class: Insecta
- Order: Coleoptera
- Suborder: Polyphaga
- Infraorder: Staphyliniformia
- Family: Staphylinidae
- Subfamily: Aleocharinae
- Tribe: Termitusini; Fenyes, 1918

Tribe of insects

Termitusini is a tribe of rove beetles in the subfamily Aleocharinae. It was first described in 1918 by Fenyes. Termitusini can be split into two subtribes, seven genera, and 47 species. Observations have been made in Australia, Guyana, South Africa, Madagascar, and Congo.

== Subtribes and genera ==
Subtribe: Termitospectrina

- Pseudotermitoecia
- Termitana
- Termitoecia
- Termitospectrum

Subtribe: Termitusina

- Termitusa
- Termitusodes
- Thoracotusa
