= Taxicerini =

Scientific classification
- Kingdom: Animalia
- Phylum: Arthropoda
- Clade: Pancrustacea
- Class: Insecta
- Order: Coleoptera
- Suborder: Polyphaga
- Infraorder: Staphyliniformia
- Family: Staphylinidae
- Subfamily: Aleocharinae
- Tribe: Taxicerini; Lohse, 1989

Taxicerini is a tribe of rove beetles in the subfamily Aleocharinae. It was first described by Lohse in 1989. It contains 3 genera, and 33 accepted species. The majority of recorded observations have been made in The United Kingdom, Portugal, Sweden, and Austria. Observations are made year-round, but peak during June and July.

== Genera ==
- Discerota
- Halobrecta
- Taxicera
