= Cordobanini =

Cordobanini is a tribe of rove beetles in the subfamily Aleocharinae. It was first described in 1910 by Bernhauer. It only has one genus, Cordobanus, which contains one species, Cordobanus mirabilis. It has been observed in Mexico.
