= Pseudoperinthini =

Scientific classification
- Kingdom: Animalia
- Phylum: Arthropoda
- Clade: Pancrustacea
- Class: Insecta
- Order: Coleoptera
- Suborder: Polyphaga
- Infraorder: Staphyliniformia
- Family: Staphylinidae
- Subfamily: Aleocharinae
- Tribe: Pseudoperinthini; Cameron, 1939

Tribe of beetles

Pseudoperinthini is a tribe of rove beetles in the subfamily Aleocharinae. It was first described by Cameron in 1939. It contains 4 genera with 26 species.

== Genera ==
- Austrointhus
- Malayinthus
- Papuinthus
- Pseudoperinthus
