= Paglini =

Scientific classification
- Kingdom: Animalia
- Phylum: Arthropoda
- Clade: Pancrustacea
- Class: Insecta
- Order: Coleoptera
- Suborder: Polyphaga
- Infraorder: Staphyliniformia
- Family: Staphylinidae
- Subfamily: Aleocharinae
- Tribe: Paglini; Newton & Thayer, 1992

Paglini is a tribe of rove beetles in the subfamily Aleocharinae. It was first described in 1992 by Newton and Thayer. It contains 14 accepted species in two genera. Currently, all recorded observations have been in Chile.

== Genera ==
- Pagla
- Paglhoplasymma
