= Trilobitideus =

Scientific classification
- Kingdom: Animalia
- Phylum: Arthropoda
- Clade: Pancrustacea
- Class: Insecta
- Order: Coleoptera
- Suborder: Polyphaga
- Infraorder: Staphyliniformia
- Family: Staphylinidae
- Subfamily: Aleocharinae
- Tribe: Trilobitideini; Fauvel, 1899
- Genus: Trilobitideus; Raffray, 1898

Genus of insects

Trilobitideini is a tribe of rove beetles in the subfamily Aleocharinae. It was first described in 1899 by Fauvel. It contains one genus, Trilobitideus, with 11 accepted species.

== Species ==
- Trilobitideus dundoensis
- Trilobitideus gotwaldi
- Trilobitideus insignis
- Trilobitideus kikuyensis
- Trilobitideus mbalensis
- Trilobitideus meneghettii
- Trilobitideus mirabilis
- Trilobitideus muguaensis
- Trilobitideus paradoxus
- Trilobitideus sinularis
- Trilobitideus wasmanni
