= Pygostenini =

Scientific classification
- Kingdom: Animalia
- Phylum: Arthropoda
- Clade: Pancrustacea
- Class: Insecta
- Order: Coleoptera
- Suborder: Polyphaga
- Infraorder: Staphyliniformia
- Family: Staphylinidae
- Subfamily: Aleocharinae
- Tribe: Pygostenini; Fauvel, 1899

Tribe of beetles

Pygostenini is a tribe of rove beetles in the subfamily Aleocharinae. It was first described by Albert Fauvel in 1899. It contains 29 genera and 268 species.

== Genera ==
- Adoketoxenus
- Aenictoxenides
- Aenictoxenus
- Anommatophilus
- Anommatoxenus
- Asthenepoda
- Delibius
- Deliodes
- Dorylotyphlus
- Doryloxenus
- Eurpygostenus
- Krotapholemon
- Lydorus
- Mandera
- Mesomegaskela
- Micropolemon
- Mimocete
- Neopygostenus
- Odontozenus
- Pegestenus
- Pogostenus
- Prodeliodes
- Pseudolydorus
- Pygoplanus
- Pygostenus
- Sympolemon
- Typhlopolemon
- Typhloponemys
- Xenidus
