= Australestesini =

Scientific classification
- Kingdom: Animalia
- Phylum: Arthropoda
- Clade: Pancrustacea
- Class: Insecta
- Order: Coleoptera
- Suborder: Polyphaga
- Infraorder: Staphyliniformia
- Family: Staphylinidae
- Subfamily: Aleocharinae
- Tribe: Australestesini; Pace, 2016

Australestesini is a tribe of rove beetles in the subfamily Aleocharinae. It was first described in 2016 by Pace. It contains two genera, each with one species.

== Genera and species ==
Genus: Apimelida

- Apimelidae makranczyi

Genus: Australestes

- Australestes crassum
