= Drepanoxenus =

Scientific classification
- Kingdom: Animalia
- Phylum: Arthropoda
- Clade: Pancrustacea
- Class: Insecta
- Order: Coleoptera
- Suborder: Polyphaga
- Infraorder: Staphyliniformia
- Family: Staphylinidae
- Subfamily: Aleocharinae
- Tribe: Drepanoxenini; Kistner & Watson, 1972
- Genus: Drepanoxenus; Kistner & Watson, 1972

Genus of beetles

Drepanoxenini is a tribe of rove beetles in the subfamily Aleocharinae. It was first described by Kistner and Watson in 1972. It contains one genus, Drepanoxenus, and eight species.

== Species ==
- Drepanoxenus ardea
- Drepanoxenus bos
- Drepanoxenus hirsuta
- Drepanoxenus intermedia
- Drepanoxenus physogastra
- Drepanoxenus quasimodus
- Drepanoxenus regina
- Drepanoxenus rubra
