= Termitodiscini =

Scientific classification
- Kingdom: Animalia
- Phylum: Arthropoda
- Clade: Pancrustacea
- Class: Insecta
- Order: Coleoptera
- Suborder: Polyphaga
- Infraorder: Staphyliniformia
- Family: Staphylinidae
- Subfamily: Aleocharinae
- Tribe: Termitodiscini; Wasmann, 1904

Tribe of beetles

Termitodiscini is a tribe of rove beetles in the subfamily Aleocharinae. It was first described by Wasmann in 1904. It contains two genera, and 43 accepted species.

== Genera ==
- Termitodiscus
- Termitogerrus
