= Phyllodinarda =

Scientific classification
- Kingdom: Animalia
- Phylum: Arthropoda
- Clade: Pancrustacea
- Class: Insecta
- Order: Coleoptera
- Suborder: Polyphaga
- Infraorder: Staphyliniformia
- Family: Staphylinidae
- Subfamily: Aleocharinae
- Tribe: Phyllodinardini; Wasmann, 1916
- Genus: Phyllodinarda; Wasmann, 1916

Genus of beetles

Phyllodinardini is a tribe of rove beetles in the subfamily Aleocharinae. It was first described by Wasmann in 1916. It contains 1 genus, Phyllodinarda, and 3 species.

== Species ==
- Phyllodinarda alzadae
- Phyllodinarda kohli
- Phyllodinarda xenocephala
