= Oxypodinini =

Scientific classification
- Kingdom: Animalia
- Phylum: Arthropoda
- Clade: Pancrustacea
- Class: Insecta
- Order: Coleoptera
- Suborder: Polyphaga
- Infraorder: Staphyliniformia
- Family: Staphylinidae
- Subfamily: Aleocharinae
- Tribe: Oxypodinini; Fenyes, 1918

Oxypodinini is a tribe of rove beetles in the subfamily Aleocharinae. It was first described by Fenyes in 1918. It cotains 6 genera, with 39 species.

== Genera ==
- Heterotaxus
- Oxypodinus
- Peliusa
- Pseudoxypodinus
- Taraxetaxus
- Thendelecrotona
