= Digrammus =

Scientific classification
- Kingdom: Animalia
- Phylum: Arthropoda
- Clade: Pancrustacea
- Class: Insecta
- Order: Coleoptera
- Suborder: Polyphaga
- Infraorder: Staphyliniformia
- Family: Staphylinidae
- Subfamily: Aleocharinae
- Tribe: Digrammini; Fauvel, 1900
- Genus: Digrammus; Fauvel, 1900
- Species: D. miricollis

Binomial name
- Digrammus miricollis Fauvel, 1900

Digirammini is a tribe of rove beetles in the subfamily Aleocharinae. It was first described by Fauvel in 1900. It contains one genus, Digrammus, with one species, Digrammus miricollis. To date, the only recorded observations have taken place in New Zealand.
