= Pronomaeini =

Scientific classification
- Kingdom: Animalia
- Phylum: Arthropoda
- Clade: Pancrustacea
- Class: Insecta
- Order: Coleoptera
- Suborder: Polyphaga
- Infraorder: Staphyliniformia
- Family: Staphylinidae
- Subfamily: Aleocharinae
- Tribe: Pronomaeini; Mulsant & Rey, 1873

Tribe of beetles

Pronomaeini is a tribe of rove beetles in the subfamly Aleocharinae. It was first described by Mulsant and Rey in 1873. It contains 7 genera with 101 species.

== Genera ==
- Mataris
- Mikrophyesusa
- Nopromaea
- Pronomaea
- Pseudomniophila
- Stylopalpus
- Tomoxelia
