= Masuria (beetle) =

Scientific classification
- Kingdom: Animalia
- Phylum: Arthropoda
- Clade: Pancrustacea
- Class: Insecta
- Order: Coleoptera
- Suborder: Polyphaga
- Infraorder: Staphyliniformia
- Family: Staphylinidae
- Subfamily: Aleocharinae
- Tribe: Masuriini; Cameron, 1939
- Genus: Masuria; Cameron, 1928

Masuriini is a tribe of rove beetles in the subfamily Aleocharinae. It was first described by Cameron in 1939. It contains one genus, Masuria, with two subgenera, and 28 accepted species.

== Subgenera and species ==
- Masuria
  - Masuria ancoriformis
  - Masuria annapurnae
  - Masuria daliensis
  - Masuria extensa
  - Masuria ferruginea
  - Masuria follita
  - Masuria kali
  - Masuria kleebergi
  - Masuria loebli
  - Masuria longicornis
  - Masuria parva
  - Masuria picipes
  - Masuria plumbea
  - Masuria rubida
  - Masuria rufescens
  - Masuria rugasepunctata
  - Masuria sculpticolls
  - Masuria smetanai
  - Masuria spectata
- Oncosomechusa
  - Masuria appendiculata
  - Masuria besucheti
  - Masuria brevipennis
  - Masuria chinensis
  - Masuria martensi
  - Masuria schuelkei
  - Masuria subnitens
  - Masuria tashigaonensis
  - Masuria yunnanica
