= Ecitogaster =

Scientific classification
- Kingdom: Animalia
- Phylum: Arthropoda
- Clade: Pancrustacea
- Class: Insecta
- Order: Coleoptera
- Suborder: Polyphaga
- Infraorder: Staphyliniformia
- Family: Staphylinidae
- Subfamily: Aleocharinae
- Tribe: Ecitogastrini; Fenyes, 1918
- Genus: Ecitogaster; Wasmann, 1900

Ecitogastrini is a tribe of rove beetles in the subfamily Aleocharinae. It was first described by Fenyes in 1918. It contains one genus, Ecitogaster, and six accepted species. Recorded observations of members of Ecitogastrini have been made in Ecuador, Brazil, and Paraguay.

== Species ==
- Ecitogaster cavicollis
- Ecitogaster condei
- Ecitogaster fossulata
- Ecitogaster mexicanus
- Ecitogaster panamensis
- Ecitogaster schmalzi
