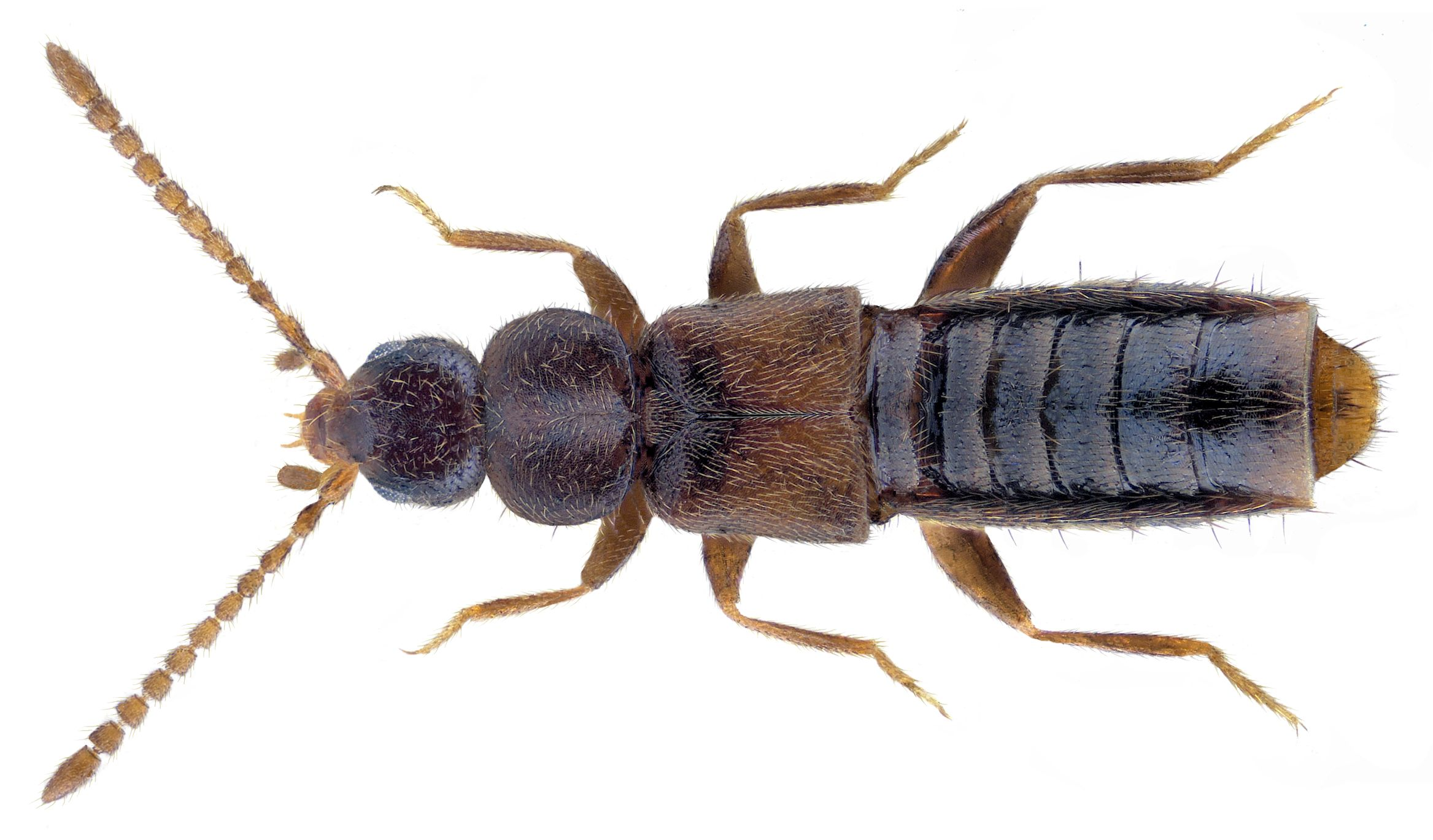

Scientific classification
- Kingdom: Animalia
- Phylum: Arthropoda
- Clade: Pancrustacea
- Class: Insecta
- Order: Coleoptera
- Suborder: Polyphaga
- Infraorder: Staphyliniformia
- Family: Staphylinidae
- Subfamily: Aleocharinae
- Tribe: Athetini
- Genus: Brundinia; Tottenham, 1949

= Brundinia =

Genus of beetles

Brundinia is a genus of beetles belonging to the family Staphylinidae.

The genus was first described by Tottenham in 1949.

The species of this genus are found in Europe and America.

Species:

- Brundinia marina
- Brundinia meridionalis
