= Acrostiba =

Scientific classification
- Domain: Eukaryota
- Kingdom: Animalia
- Phylum: Arthropoda
- Class: Insecta
- Order: Coleoptera
- Suborder: Polyphaga
- Infraorder: Staphyliniformia
- Family: Staphylinidae
- Genus: Acrostiba; Thomson, 1858

Genus of beetles

Acrostiba is a genus of beetles belonging to the family Staphylinidae.

The species of this genus are found in Northern Europe.

Species:

- Acrostiba borealis Thomson, 1861
- Acrostiba tibetana Bernhauer, 1933
