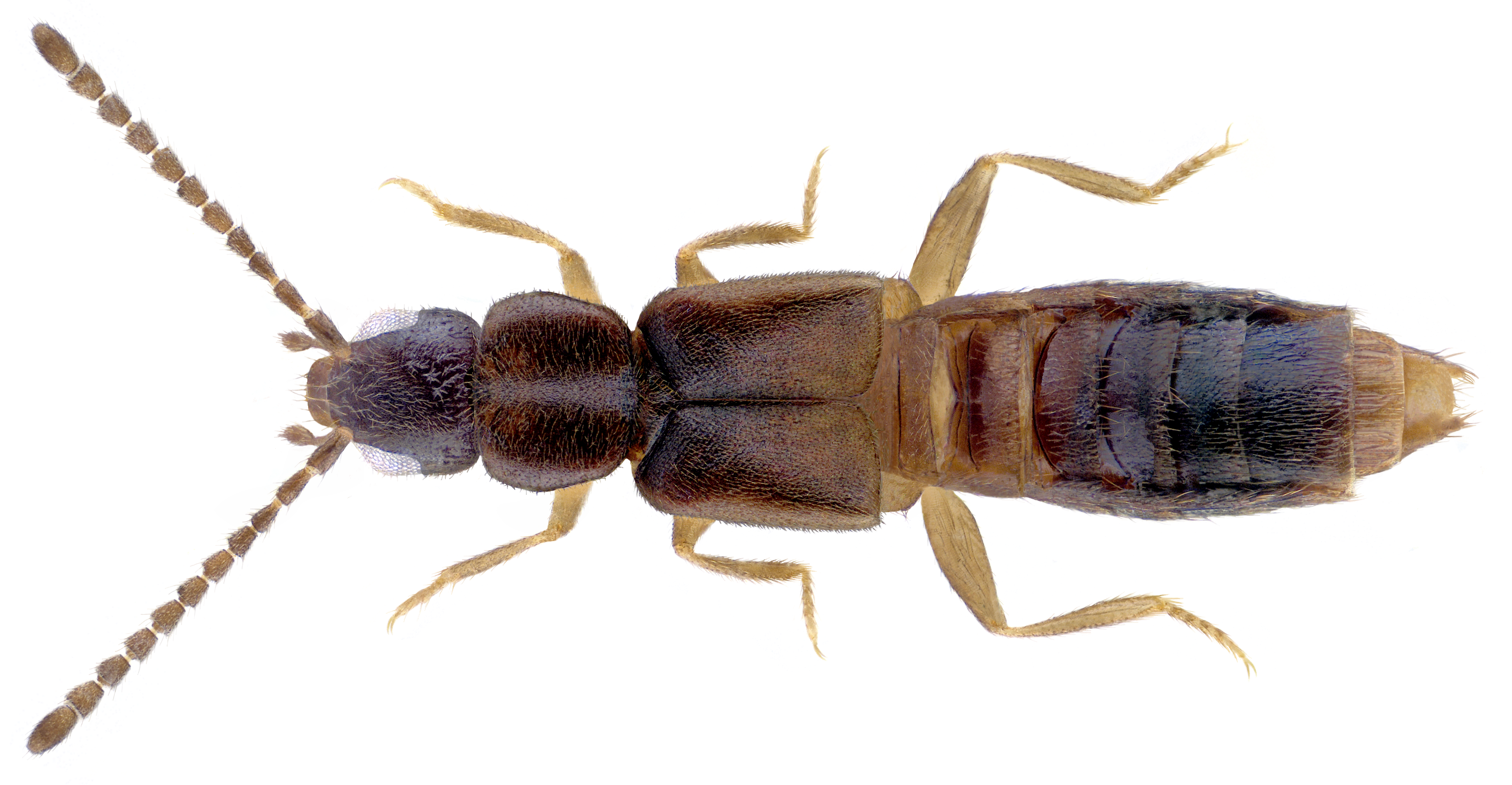
- Hydrosmecta longula found in Europe

Scientific classification
- Kingdom: Animalia
- Phylum: Arthropoda
- Clade: Pancrustacea
- Class: Insecta
- Order: Coleoptera
- Suborder: Polyphaga
- Infraorder: Staphyliniformia
- Family: Staphylinidae
- Genus: Hydrosmecta; Thomson, 1858

= Hydrosmecta =

Genus of beetles

Hydrosmecta is a genus of beetles belonging to the family Staphylinidae.

The species of this genus are found in Europe and North America. They can be found in riparian habitats.

Species:

- Hydrosmecta abyssina Pace, 1986
- Hydrosmecta angustissima (Wollaston, 1864)
- Hydrosmecta borealis Klimaszewski and Langor, 2011
- Hydrosmecta caduca Casey, 1910
- Hydrosmecta callidula Casey, 1910
- Hydrosmecta canadensis Webster and Klimaszewski, 2017
- Hydrosmecta dulcis Casey, 1910
- Hydrosmecta minutissimoides Webster and Klimaszewski, 2017
- Hydrosmecta longula (Heer, 1839)
