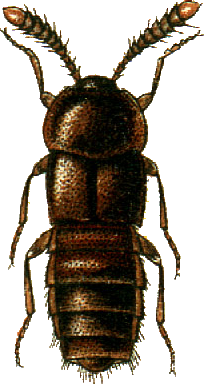
- Euryusa sinuata Jacobson (sub-specie)

Scientific classification
- Kingdom: Animalia
- Phylum: Arthropoda
- Class: Insecta
- Order: Coleoptera
- Suborder: Polyphaga
- Infraorder: Staphyliniformia
- Family: Staphylinidae
- Genus: Euryusa; Erichson, 1837

= Euryusa =

Genus of beetles

Euryusa is a genus of beetles belonging to the family Staphylinidae.

The species of this genus are found in Europe.

Species:

- Euryusa aliena Cameron, 1945
- Euryusa anatolica Assing, 2002
