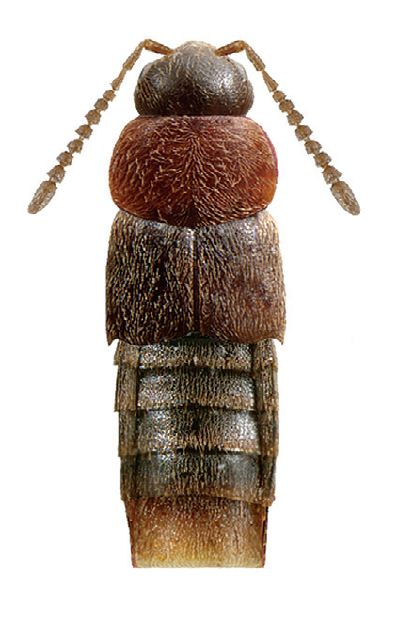
- Oxypoda gnara

Scientific classification
- Kingdom: Animalia
- Phylum: Arthropoda
- Clade: Pancrustacea
- Class: Insecta
- Order: Coleoptera
- Suborder: Polyphaga
- Infraorder: Staphyliniformia
- Family: Staphylinidae
- Genus: Oxypoda; Mannerheim, 1830

= Oxypoda =

Genus of beetles

Oxypoda is a genus of beetles belonging to the family Staphylinidae.

The genus has almost cosmopolitan distribution.

Species:

- Oxypoda abdominalis (Mannerheim, 1830)
- Oxypoda acuminata (Stephens, 1832)
- Oxypoda bimontium Assing, 2019
- Oxypoda brachyptera (Stephens, 1832)
- Oxypoda haemorrhoa (Mannerheim C.G., 1830)
- Oxypoda opaca (Gravenhorst, 1802)
- Oxypoda tarda Sharp, 1871
