= Ocalea (beetle) =

Scientific classification
- Kingdom: Animalia
- Phylum: Arthropoda
- Class: Insecta
- Order: Coleoptera
- Suborder: Polyphaga
- Infraorder: Staphyliniformia
- Family: Staphylinidae
- Genus: Ocalea

Genus of beetles

Ocalea is a genus of the rove beetles (insects in the family Staphylinidae). The group contains 24 species which can be found on the mainland of Europe (mostly in Romania) North America (British Columbia and perhaps other locations), and in New Zealand.

== Species ==
- Ocalea agnita
- Ocalea badia
- Ocalea columbiana
- Ocalea franciscana
- Ocalea grandicollis
- Ocalea gyorgyi
- Ocalea robusta
