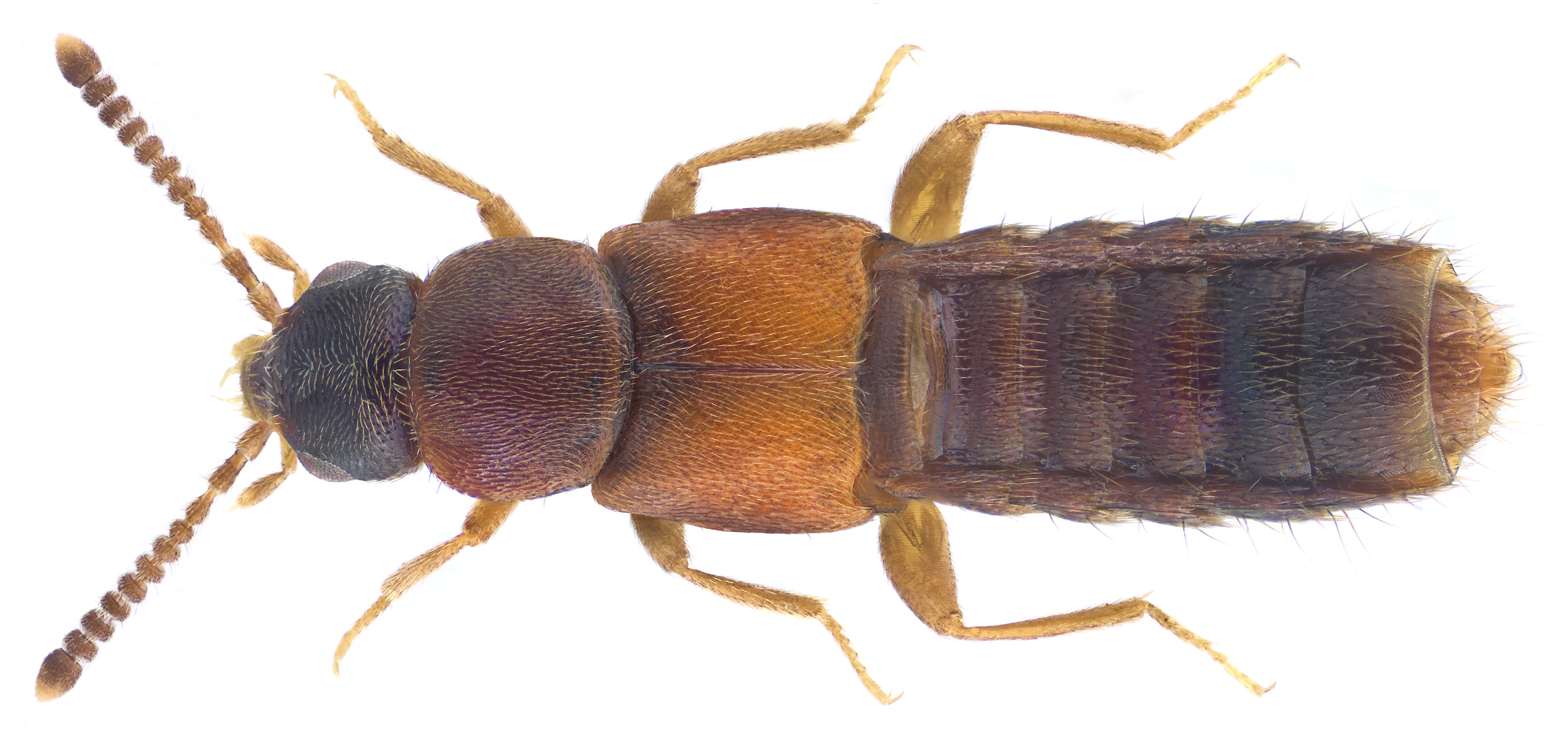
- Phloeopora

Scientific classification
- Kingdom: Animalia
- Phylum: Arthropoda
- Class: Insecta
- Order: Coleoptera
- Suborder: Polyphaga
- Infraorder: Staphyliniformia
- Family: Staphylinidae
- Genus: Phloeopora; Erichson, 1837

= Phloeopora =

Genus of beetles

Phloeopora is a genus of beetles belonging to the family Staphylinidae.

The species of this genus are found in Europe, Australia and America.

Species:

- Phloeopora adversa Casey, 1911
- Phloeopora africana Bernhauer, 1915
