= Haploglossa =

Scientific classification
- Kingdom: Animalia
- Phylum: Arthropoda
- Clade: Pancrustacea
- Class: Insecta
- Order: Coleoptera
- Suborder: Polyphaga
- Infraorder: Staphyliniformia
- Family: Staphylinidae
- Genus: Haploglossa; Kraatz, 1856

Genus of beetles

Haploglossa is a genus of beetles belonging to the family Staphylinidae.

The species of this genus are found in Europe and North America.

Species:

- Haploglossa barberi (Fenyes, 1921)
- Haploglossa gentilis (Märkel, 1844)
