= Anaulacaspis =

Scientific classification
- Kingdom: Animalia
- Phylum: Arthropoda
- Class: Insecta
- Order: Coleoptera
- Suborder: Polyphaga
- Infraorder: Staphyliniformia
- Family: Staphylinidae
- Genus: Anaulacaspis; Ganglbauer, 1895

Genus of beetles

Anaulacaspis is a genus of beetles belonging to the family Staphylinidae.

The species of this genus are found in Europe, Africa and Northern America.

Species:

- Anaulacaspis adnexa (Fauvel, 1907)
- Anaulacaspis africana (Cameron, 1947)
