= Dochmonota =

Scientific classification
- Kingdom: Animalia
- Phylum: Arthropoda
- Clade: Pancrustacea
- Class: Insecta
- Order: Coleoptera
- Suborder: Polyphaga
- Infraorder: Staphyliniformia
- Family: Staphylinidae
- Genus: Dochmonota; Thomson, 1859

Genus of beetles

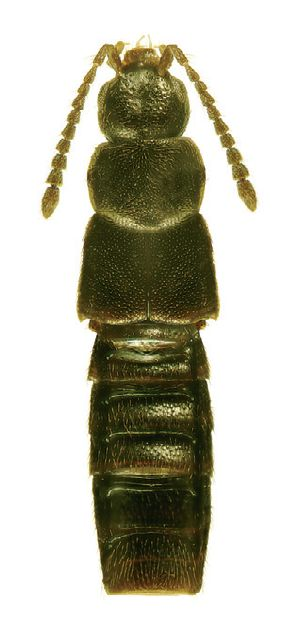
Dochmonota rudiventris

Dochmonota is a genus of beetles belonging to the family Staphylinidae.

The species of this genus are found in Europe and North America.

Species:

- Dochmonota clancula (Erichson, 1837)
- Dochmonota langori Klimaszewski & Larson, 2016
- Dochmonota simulans Klimaszewski & Larson, 2016 - found in North America
- Dochmonota websteri Klimaszewski & Larson, 2016 - found in North America
