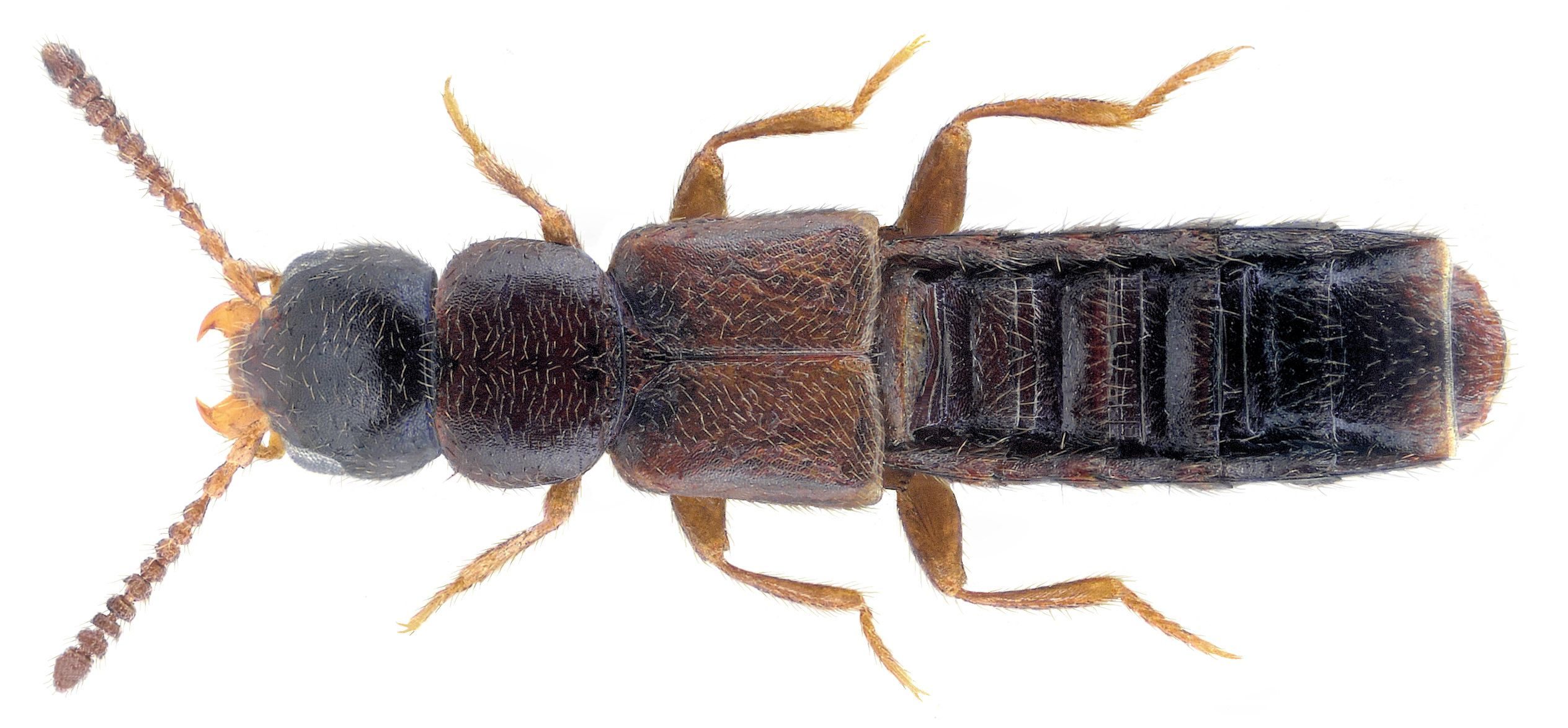

Scientific classification
- Domain: Eukaryota
- Kingdom: Animalia
- Phylum: Arthropoda
- Class: Insecta
- Order: Coleoptera
- Suborder: Polyphaga
- Infraorder: Staphyliniformia
- Family: Staphylinidae
- Genus: Paranopleta; Brundin, 1954

= Paranopleta =

Genus of beetles

Paranopleta is a genus of beetles belonging to the family Staphylinidae.

The species of this genus are found in Northern Europe.

Species:

- Paranopleta inhabilis (Kraatz, 1856)
