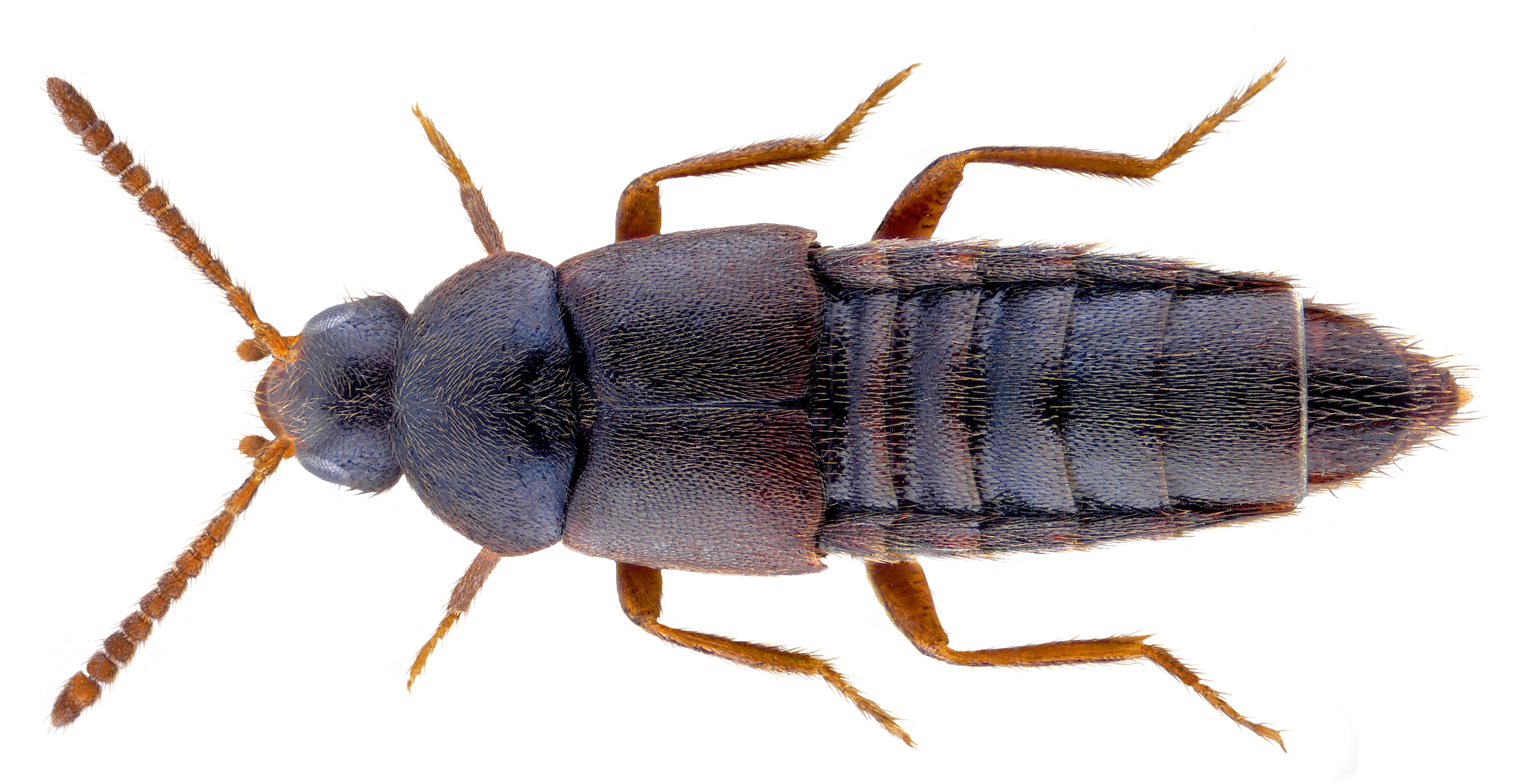
- A beetle belonging to the genus Hygropora

Scientific classification
- Kingdom: Animalia
- Phylum: Arthropoda
- Clade: Pancrustacea
- Class: Insecta
- Order: Coleoptera
- Suborder: Polyphaga
- Infraorder: Staphyliniformia
- Family: Staphylinidae
- Genus: Hygropora; Kraatz, 1856

= Hygropora =

Genus of beetles

Hygropora is a genus of beetles belonging to the family Staphylinidae.

The species of this genus are found in Europe.

Species:

- Hygropora cunctans (Erichson, 1837)
- Hygropora longicornis Palm, 1949
