= Pachyatheta =

Scientific classification
- Domain: Eukaryota
- Kingdom: Animalia
- Phylum: Arthropoda
- Class: Insecta
- Order: Coleoptera
- Suborder: Polyphaga
- Infraorder: Staphyliniformia
- Family: Staphylinidae
- Genus: Pachyatheta; Munster, 1924

Genus of beetles

Pachyatheta is a genus of beetles belonging to the family Staphylinidae.

Species:

- Pachyatheta mortuorum (Thomson, 1867)
- Pachyatheta cribrata (Kraatz, 1856)
