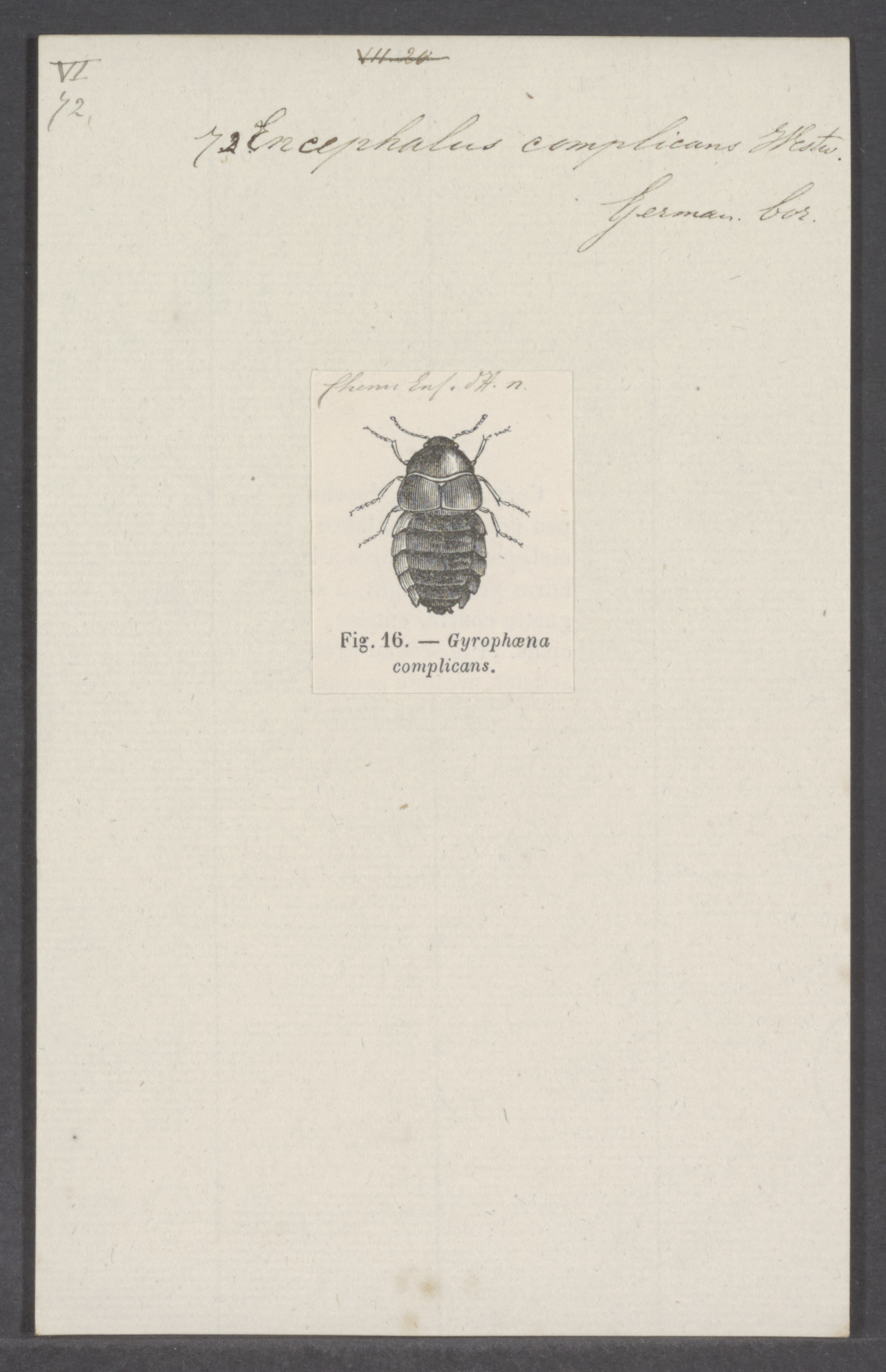
- Encephalus

Scientific classification
- Domain: Eukaryota
- Kingdom: Animalia
- Phylum: Arthropoda
- Class: Insecta
- Order: Coleoptera
- Suborder: Polyphaga
- Infraorder: Staphyliniformia
- Family: Staphylinidae
- Genus: Encephalus; Stephens, 1832

= Encephalus =

Genus of beetles

Encephalus is a genus of beetles belonging to the family Staphylinidae.

The species of this genus are found in Eurasia, New Zealand and North America.

Species:

- Encephalus aberrans (Cameron, 1939)
- Encephalus americanus Seevers, 1951
- Encephalus angusticollis Sahlberg 1880
- Encephalus appendicis Pace, 2010
