= Lyprocorrhe =

Scientific classification
- Domain: Eukaryota
- Kingdom: Animalia
- Phylum: Arthropoda
- Class: Insecta
- Order: Coleoptera
- Suborder: Polyphaga
- Infraorder: Staphyliniformia
- Family: Staphylinidae
- Genus: Lyprocorrhe; Thomson, 1859

Genus of beetles

Lyprocorrhe is a genus of beetles belonging to the family Staphylinidae.

The species of this genus are found in Europe.

Species:

- Lyprocorrhe anceps (Erichson, 1837)
