= Mniusa =

Scientific classification
- Domain: Eukaryota
- Kingdom: Animalia
- Phylum: Arthropoda
- Class: Insecta
- Order: Coleoptera
- Suborder: Polyphaga
- Infraorder: Staphyliniformia
- Family: Staphylinidae
- Genus: Mniusa; Mulsant & Rey

Genus of beetles

Mniusa is a genus of beetles belonging to the family Staphylinidae.

The species of this genus are found in Europe and Northern America.

Species:

- Mniusa grandiceps (Sahlberg, 1876)
- Mniusa incrassata (Mulsant & Rey, 1851)
