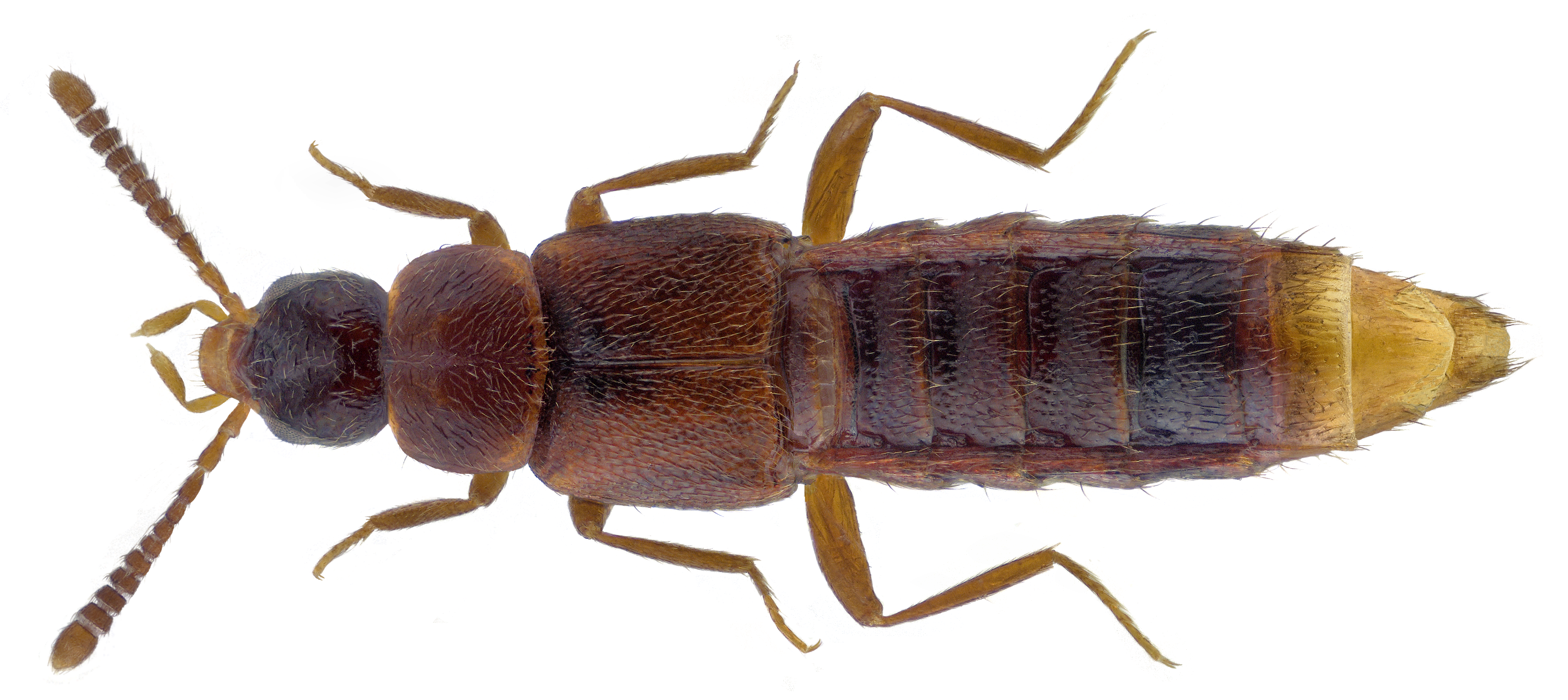

Scientific classification
- Kingdom: Animalia
- Phylum: Arthropoda
- Class: Insecta
- Order: Coleoptera
- Suborder: Polyphaga
- Infraorder: Staphyliniformia
- Family: Staphylinidae
- Genus: Ischnoglossa; Kraatz, 1856

= Ischnoglossa =

Genus of beetles

Ischnoglossa is a genus of beetles belonging to the family Staphylinidae.

The species of this genus are found in Europe.

Species:

- Ischnoglossa angustiventris Casey
- Ischnoglossa asperata Casey
