= Ousipalia =

Scientific classification
- Domain: Eukaryota
- Kingdom: Animalia
- Phylum: Arthropoda
- Class: Insecta
- Order: Coleoptera
- Suborder: Polyphaga
- Infraorder: Staphyliniformia
- Family: Staphylinidae
- Genus: Ousipalia; Gozis, 1886

Genus of beetles

Ousipalia is a genus of beetles belonging to the family Staphylinidae.

The species of this genus are found in Europe.

Species:

- Ousipalia altissima (Bernhauer, 1931)
- Ousipalia caesula (Erichson, 1839)
