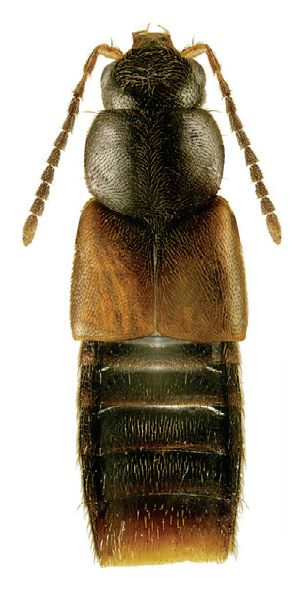
- Philhygra botanicarum

Scientific classification
- Domain: Eukaryota
- Kingdom: Animalia
- Phylum: Arthropoda
- Class: Insecta
- Order: Coleoptera
- Suborder: Polyphaga
- Infraorder: Staphyliniformia
- Family: Staphylinidae
- Genus: Philhygra; Mulsant & Rey, 1873

= Philhygra =

Genus of beetles

Philhygra is a genus of beetles belonging to the family Staphylinidae.

The species of this genus are found in Europe and Northern America.

Species:

- Philhygra criddlei (Casey, 1911)
- Philhygra homoeopyga Eppelsheim, 1893
