= Cousya =

Scientific classification
- Domain: Eukaryota
- Kingdom: Animalia
- Phylum: Arthropoda
- Class: Insecta
- Order: Coleoptera
- Suborder: Polyphaga
- Infraorder: Staphyliniformia
- Family: Staphylinidae
- Genus: Cousya; Mulsant & Rey, 1875

Genus of beetles

Cousya is a genus of beetles belonging to the family Staphylinidae.

The genus was first described by Mulsant and Rey.

Synonym: Chilomorpha Krasa, 1914

The species of this genus are found in Europe.

Species:

- Cousya ajmonis (Bernhauer, 1934)
- Cousya longitarsis (Thomson, 1867)
