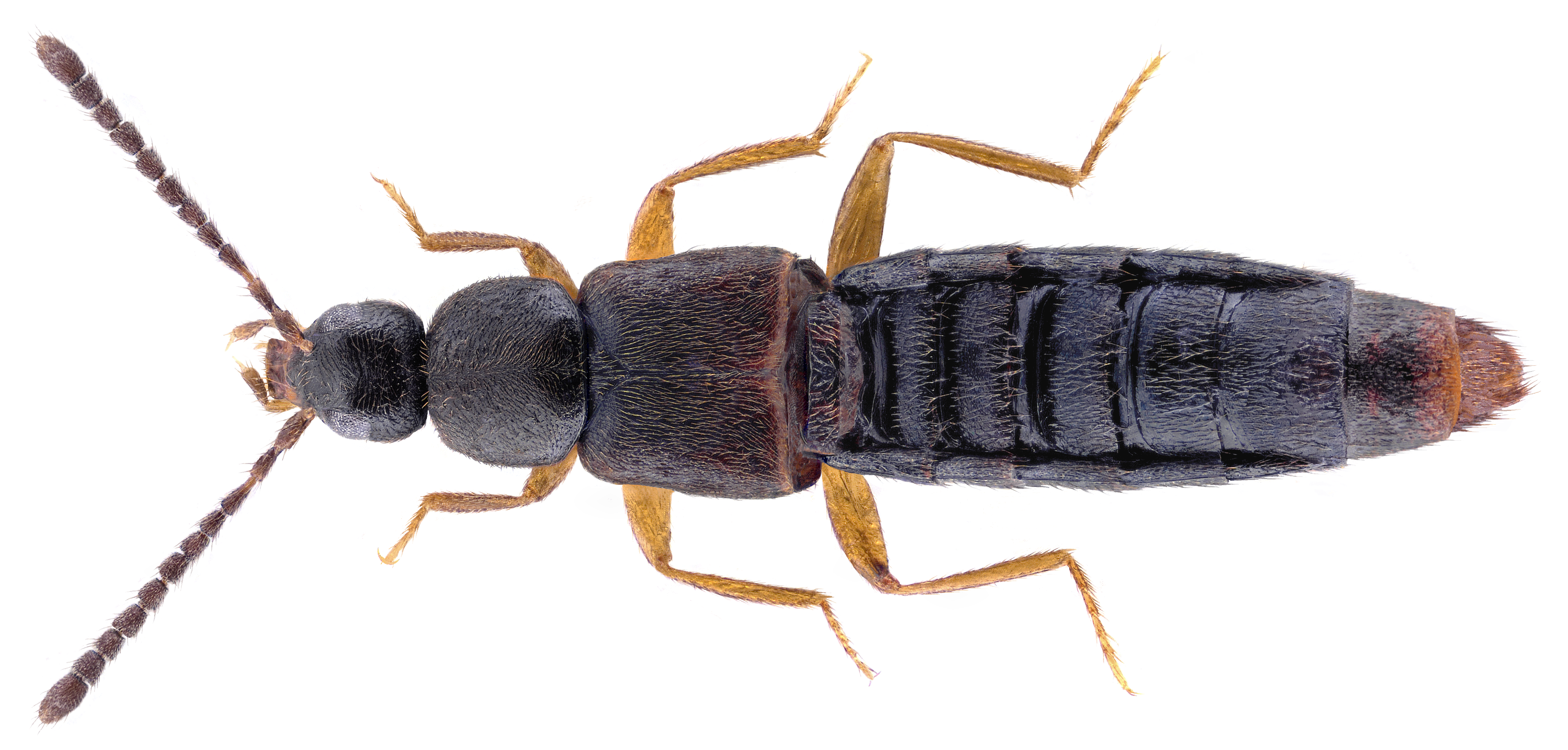
- Dilacra luteipes

Scientific classification
- Domain: Eukaryota
- Kingdom: Animalia
- Phylum: Arthropoda
- Class: Insecta
- Order: Coleoptera
- Suborder: Polyphaga
- Infraorder: Staphyliniformia
- Family: Staphylinidae
- Genus: Dilacra; Thomson, 1858

= Dilacra =

Genus of beetles

Dilacra is a genus of beetles belonging to the family Staphylinidae.

The species of this genus are found in Europe and North America.

Species:

- Dilacra cauta (Casey, 1911)
- Dilacra deserticola Casey
