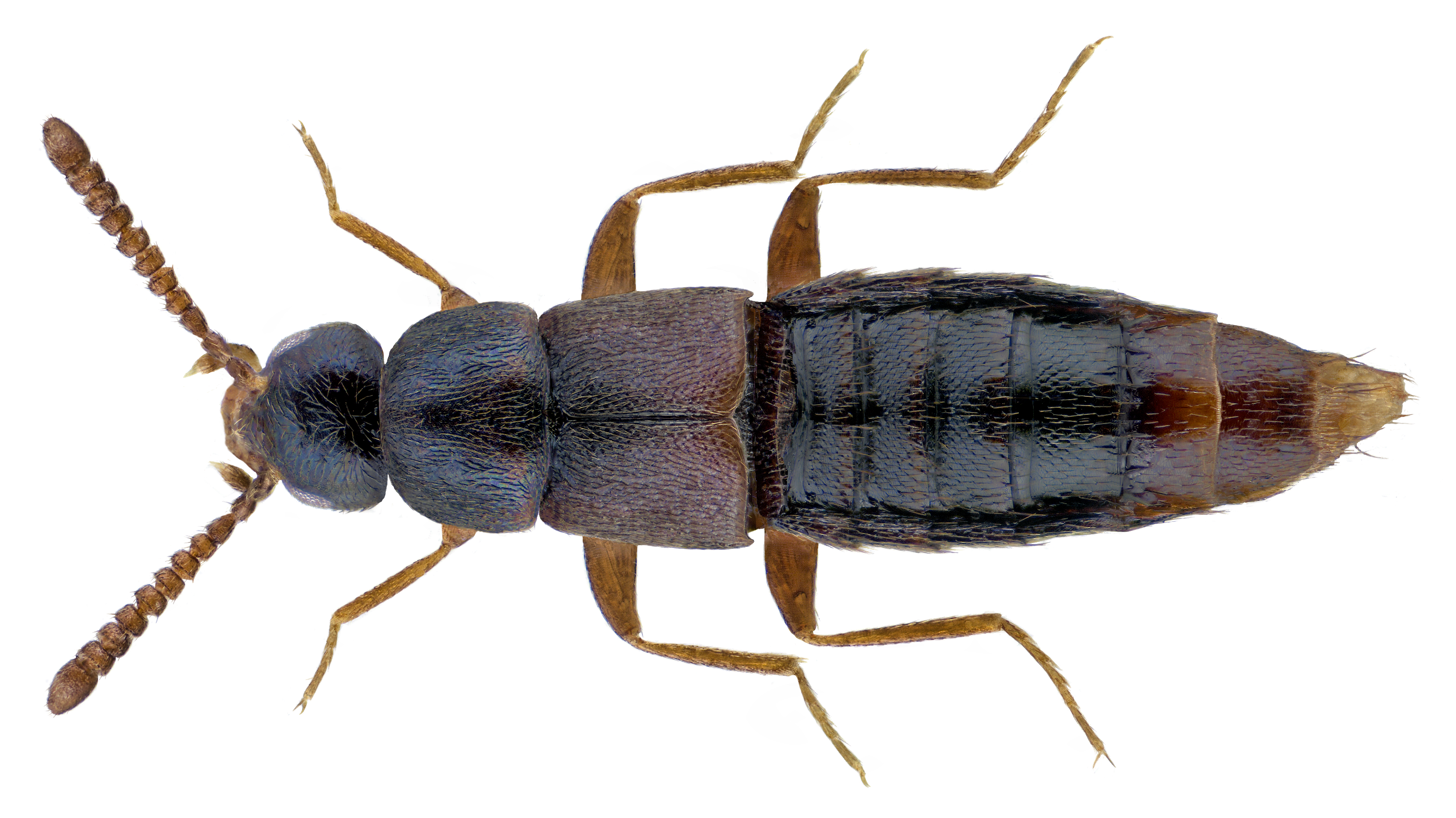
- Pycnota paradoxa

Scientific classification
- Domain: Eukaryota
- Kingdom: Animalia
- Phylum: Arthropoda
- Class: Insecta
- Order: Coleoptera
- Suborder: Polyphaga
- Infraorder: Staphyliniformia
- Family: Staphylinidae
- Genus: Pycnota; Mulsant & Rey, 1874

= Pycnota =

Genus of beetles

Pycnota is a genus of beetles belonging to the family Staphylinidae.

The species of this genus are found in Europe.

Species:

- Pycnota aleocharaesimilis (Scheerpeltz, 1972)
- Pycnota fuegina Pace, 1999
