= Dinarda =

Scientific classification
- Kingdom: Animalia
- Phylum: Arthropoda
- Class: Insecta
- Order: Coleoptera
- Suborder: Polyphaga
- Infraorder: Staphyliniformia
- Family: Staphylinidae
- Genus: Dinarda; Leach, 1819

Genus of beetles

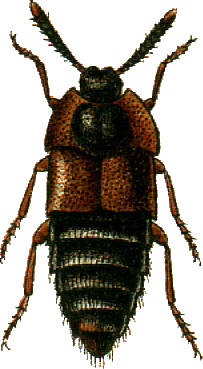

Dinarda is a genus of beetles belonging to the family Staphylinidae.

The species of this genus are found in Europe.

Species:

- Dinarda africana Bernhauer, 1917
- Dinarda dentata (Gravenhorst, 1806)
