= Callicerus =

Scientific classification
- Kingdom: Animalia
- Phylum: Arthropoda
- Clade: Pancrustacea
- Class: Insecta
- Order: Coleoptera
- Suborder: Polyphaga
- Infraorder: Staphyliniformia
- Family: Staphylinidae
- Genus: Callicerus; Gravenhorst, 1802

Genus of beetles

Callicerus is a genus of beetles belonging to the family Staphylinidae.

The species of this genus are found in Europe and North America.

Species:

- Callicerus appenninus Assing, 2001
- Callicerus atricollis (Aubé, 1850)
- Callicerus rigidicornis (Erichson, 1839)
