= Oligota =

Scientific classification
- Kingdom: Animalia
- Phylum: Arthropoda
- Clade: Pancrustacea
- Class: Insecta
- Order: Coleoptera
- Suborder: Polyphaga
- Infraorder: Staphyliniformia
- Family: Staphylinidae
- Genus: Oligota; Mannerheim, 1830

Genus of beetles

This image has been extracted from another file.

Oligota is a genus of beetles belonging to the family Staphylinidae.

The genus has cosmopolitan distribution.

Species:

- Oligota adpropinquans Sharp, 1908
- Oligota aethiops Sharp, 1908
