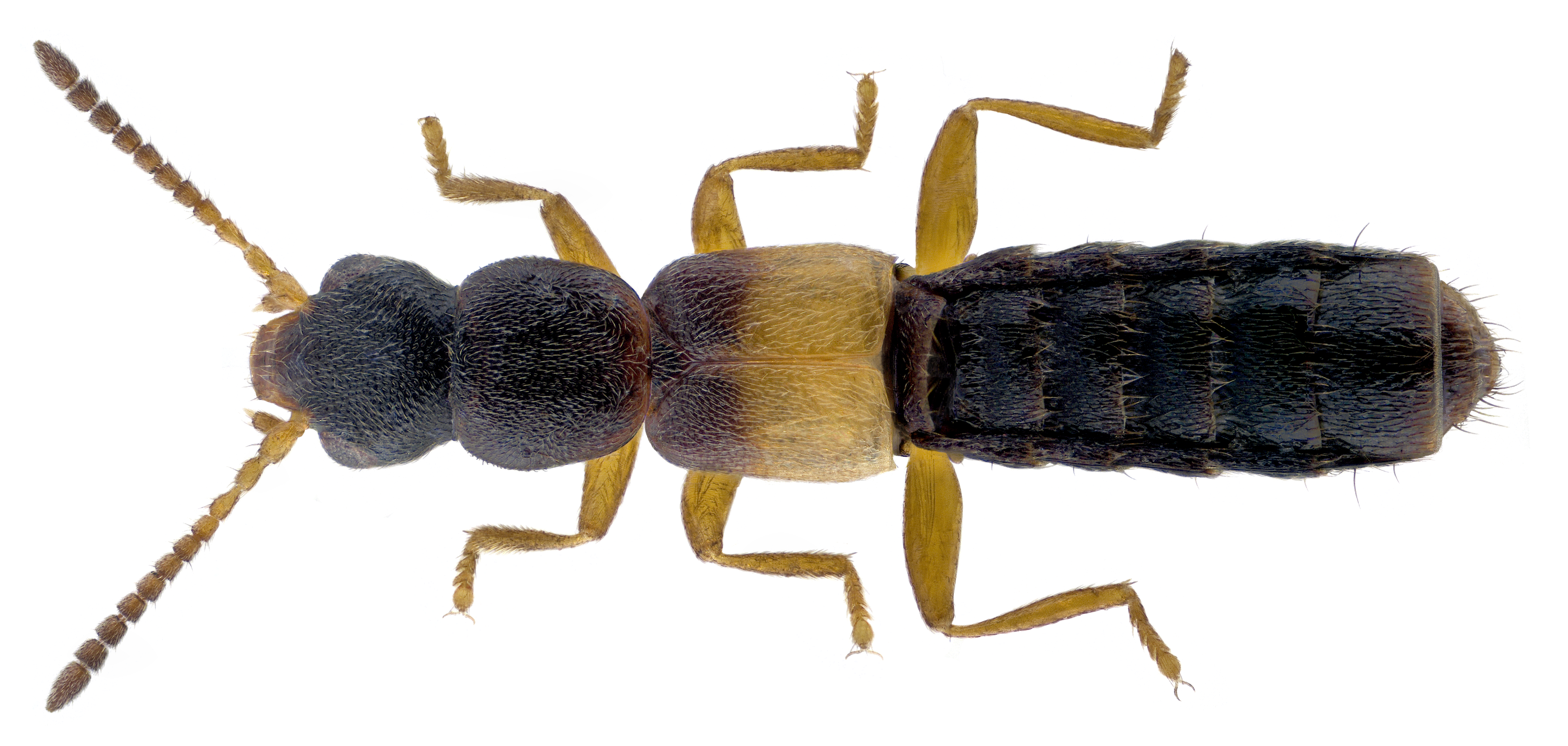
- Hygronoma dimidiata

Scientific classification
- Kingdom: Animalia
- Phylum: Arthropoda
- Class: Insecta
- Order: Coleoptera
- Suborder: Polyphaga
- Infraorder: Staphyliniformia
- Family: Staphylinidae
- Genus: Hygronoma; Erichson, 1837

= Hygronoma =

Genus of beetles

Hygronoma is a genus of beetles belonging to the family Staphylinidae.

The species of this genus are found in Europe.

Species:

- Hygronoma calida (Bernhauer, 1908)
- Hygronoma chinensis Pace, 2004
