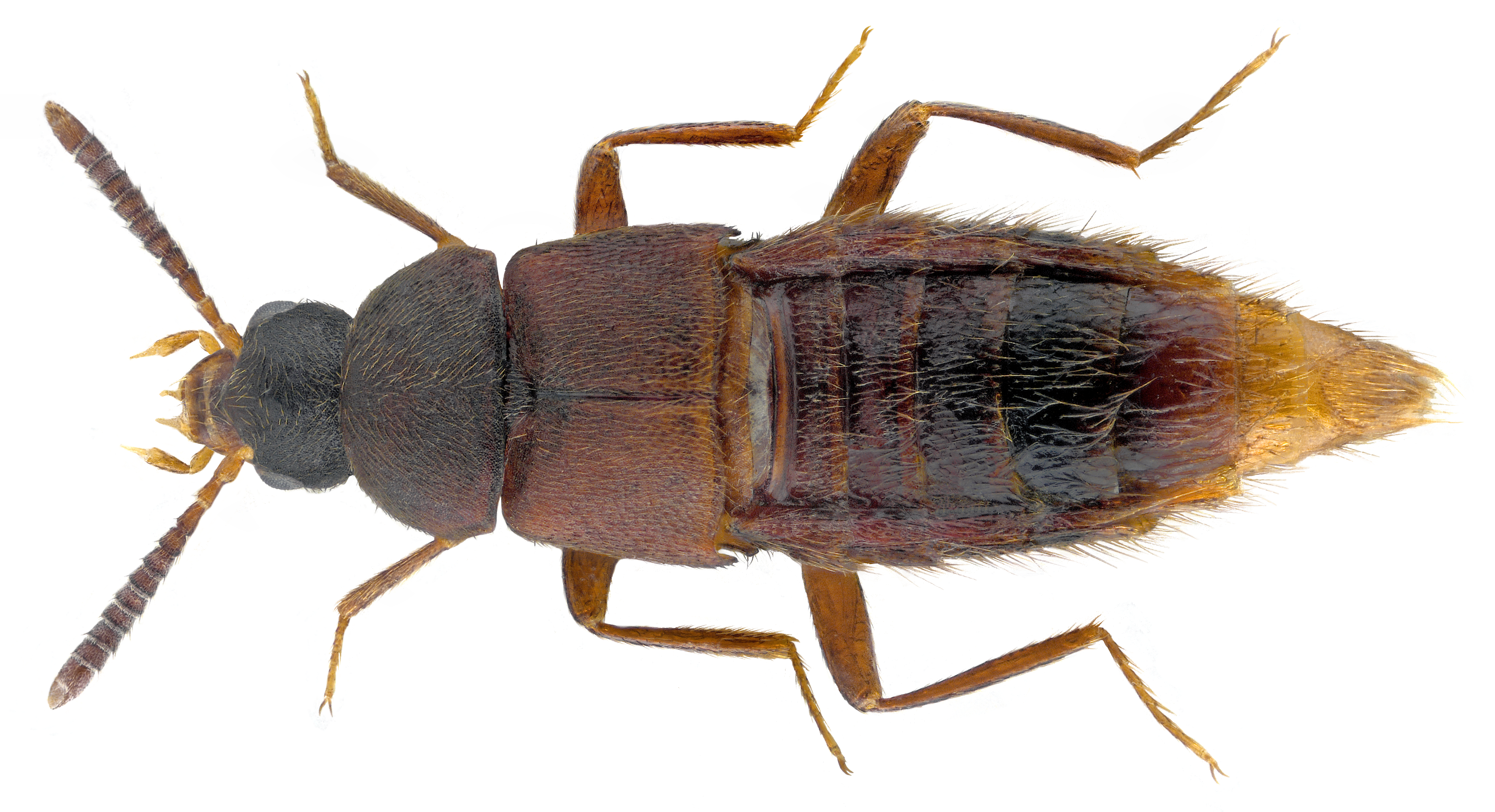
- Thiasophila angulata

Scientific classification
- Domain: Eukaryota
- Kingdom: Animalia
- Phylum: Arthropoda
- Class: Insecta
- Order: Coleoptera
- Suborder: Polyphaga
- Infraorder: Staphyliniformia
- Family: Staphylinidae
- Genus: Thiasophila; Kraatz, 1856

= Thiasophila =

Genus of beetles

Thiasophila is a genus of beetles belonging to the family Staphylinidae.

The species of this genus are found in Europe and Northern America.

Species:

- Thiasophila angulata (Erichson, 1837)
- Thiasophila aynumosir Maruyama & Zerche, 2014
