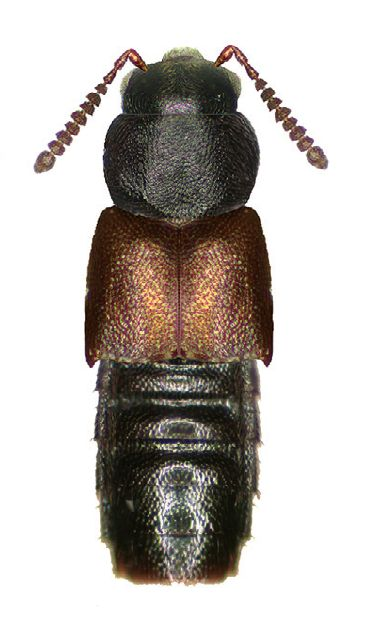
- Silusa densa

Scientific classification
- Kingdom: Animalia
- Phylum: Arthropoda
- Class: Insecta
- Order: Coleoptera
- Suborder: Polyphaga
- Infraorder: Staphyliniformia
- Family: Staphylinidae
- Genus: Silusa; Erichson, 1837

= Silusa =

Genus of beetles

Silusa is a genus of beetles belonging to the family Staphylinidae.

The species of this genus are found in Europe and Northern America.

Species:

- Silusa africana (Cameron, 1930)
- Silusa alternans Erichson, 1837
