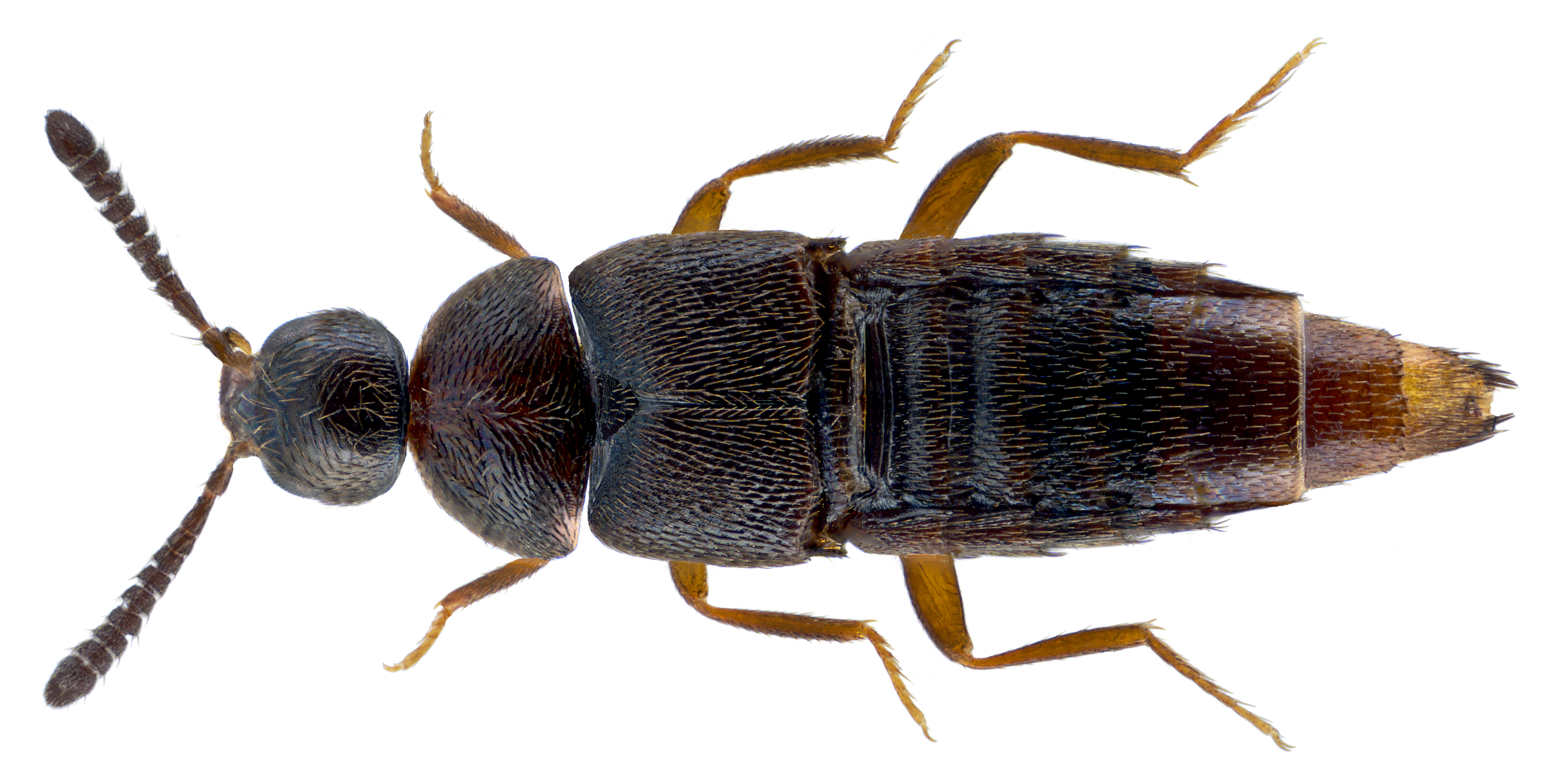
- Tinotus morion

Scientific classification
- Kingdom: Animalia
- Phylum: Arthropoda
- Class: Insecta
- Order: Coleoptera
- Suborder: Polyphaga
- Infraorder: Staphyliniformia
- Family: Staphylinidae
- Genus: Tinotus; Sharp, 1883

= Tinotus =

Genus of beetles

Tinotus is a genus of beetles belonging to the family Staphylinidae.

The species of this genus are found in America.

- Tinotus acerbus
- Tinotus caviceps
- Tinotus imbricatus
