= Thecturota =

Scientific classification
- Kingdom: Animalia
- Phylum: Arthropoda
- Class: Insecta
- Order: Coleoptera
- Suborder: Polyphaga
- Infraorder: Staphyliniformia
- Family: Staphylinidae
- Genus: Thecturota; Casey, 1893

Genus of beetles

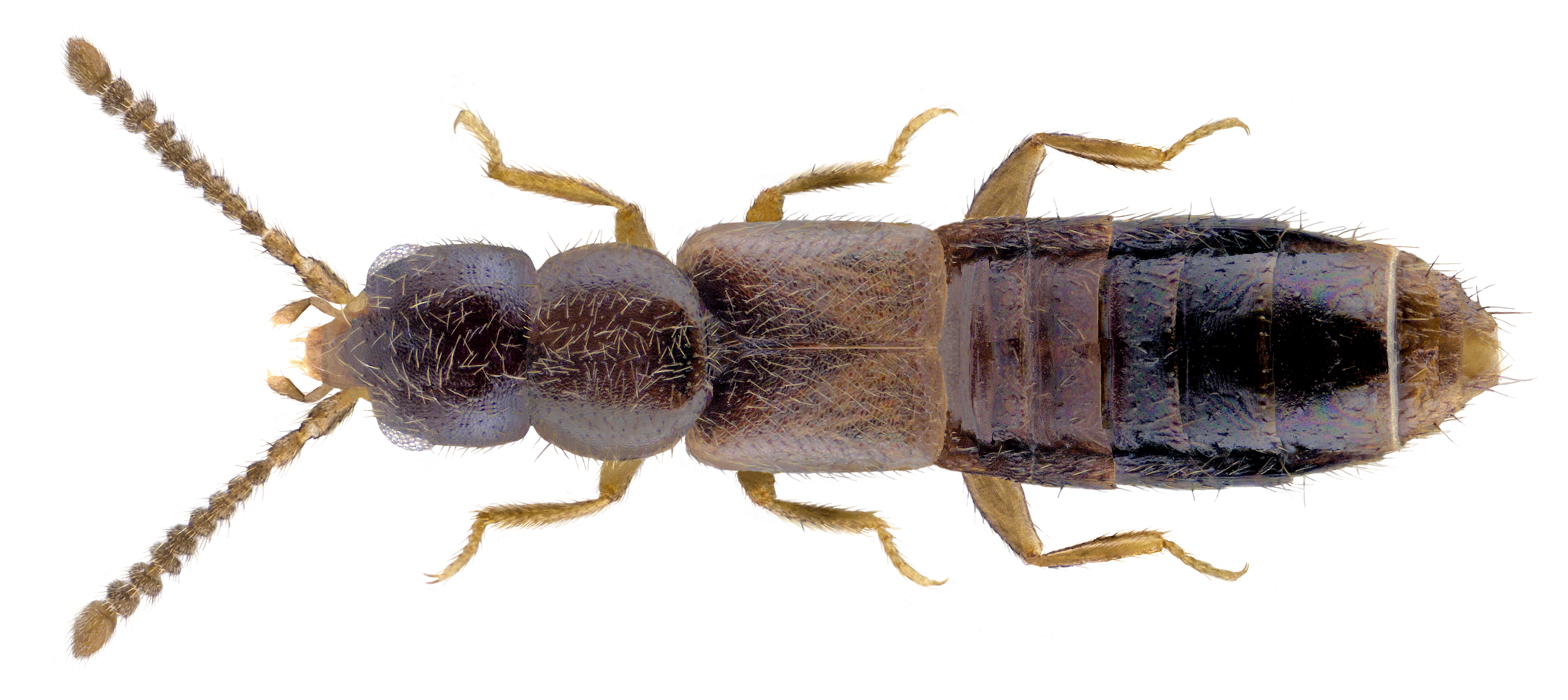

Thecturota is a genus of beetles belonging to the family Staphylinidae.

The species of this genus are found in Europe and North America.

Species:

- Thecturota antillarum Pace, 1987
- Thecturota capito Casey, 1893
