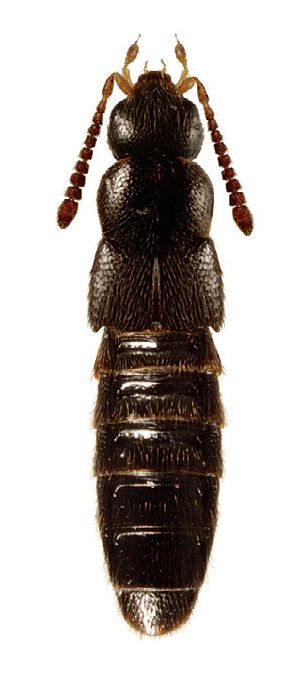
- Ocysa Asperula

Scientific classification
- Kingdom: Animalia
- Phylum: Arthropoda
- Class: Insecta
- Order: Coleoptera
- Suborder: Polyphaga
- Infraorder: Staphyliniformia
- Family: Staphylinidae
- Genus: Ocyusa; Kraatz, 1856

= Ocyusa =

Genus of beetles

Ocyusa is a genus of beetles belonging to the family Staphylinidae.

The species of this genus are found in Europe and Northern America.

Species:

- Ocyusa apicalis Normand, 1935
- Ocyusa argus (Normand, 1935)
