= Cypha =

Scientific classification
- Kingdom: Animalia
- Phylum: Arthropoda
- Class: Insecta
- Order: Coleoptera
- Suborder: Polyphaga
- Infraorder: Staphyliniformia
- Family: Staphylinidae
- Genus: Cypha; Leach, 1819

Genus of beetles

Cypha is a genus of beetles belonging to the family Staphylinidae.

The genus has almost cosmopolitan distribution.

Species:

- Cypha abyssiniensis (Pace, 1986)
- Cypha ampliata Assing, 2010
- Cypha angularis (Luze, 1902)
