= Ischnopoda =

Scientific classification
- Domain: Eukaryota
- Kingdom: Animalia
- Phylum: Arthropoda
- Class: Insecta
- Order: Coleoptera
- Suborder: Polyphaga
- Infraorder: Staphyliniformia
- Family: Staphylinidae
- Genus: Ischnopoda; Stephens, 1837

Genus of beetles

Ischnopoda is a genus of beetles belonging to the family Staphylinidae.

Species:

- Ischnopoda constricta (Erichson, 1837)
- Ischnopoda atra (Gravenhorst, 1806)
- Ischnopoda leucopus (Marsham, 1802)
- Ischnopoda scitula (Erichson, 1837)
