= Ilyobates =

Scientific classification
- Domain: Eukaryota
- Kingdom: Animalia
- Phylum: Arthropoda
- Class: Insecta
- Order: Coleoptera
- Suborder: Polyphaga
- Infraorder: Staphyliniformia
- Family: Staphylinidae
- Genus: Ilyobates; Kraatz, 1856

Genus of insects

Ilyobates is a genus of beetles belonging to the family Staphylinidae.

Species:

- Ilyobates bennetti Donisthorpe, 1914
- Ilyobates haroldi Ihssen, 1934
- Ilyobates mech (Baudi, 1848)
- Ilyobates merkli Eppelsheim, 1883
- Ilyobates mirabilis Assing, 1999
- Ilyobates nigricollis (Paykull, 1800)
- Ilyobates propinquus (Aubé, 1850)
