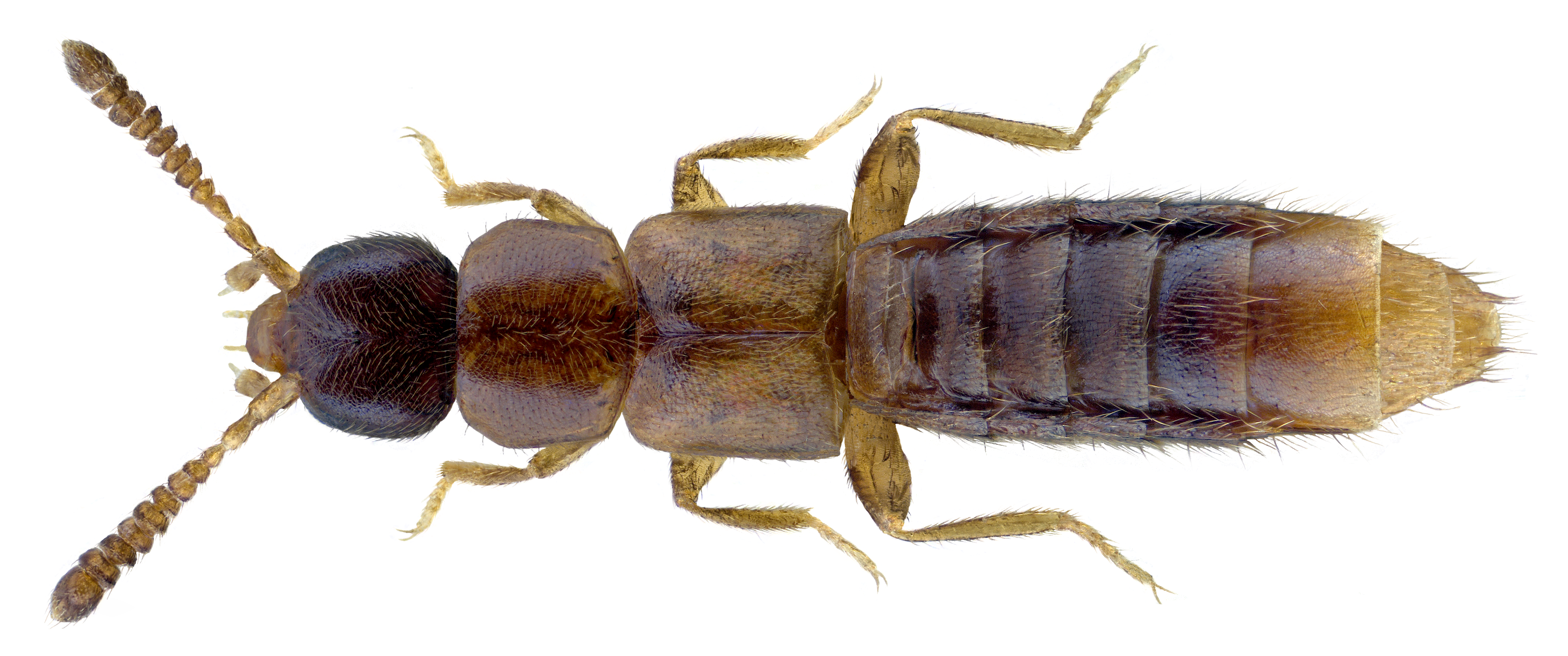
- Meotica filiformis

Scientific classification
- Domain: Eukaryota
- Kingdom: Animalia
- Phylum: Arthropoda
- Class: Insecta
- Order: Coleoptera
- Suborder: Polyphaga
- Infraorder: Staphyliniformia
- Family: Staphylinidae
- Genus: Meotica; Mulsant & Rey, 1873

= Meotica =

Genus of beetles

Meotica is a genus of beetles belonging to the family Staphylinidae.

The species of this genus are found in Europe and Northern America.

Species:

- Meotica aegyptia Pace, 1983
- Meotica albanica Benick, 1953
