= Leptostiba =

Scientific classification
- Kingdom: Animalia
- Phylum: Arthropoda
- Class: Insecta
- Order: Coleoptera
- Suborder: Polyphaga
- Infraorder: Staphyliniformia
- Family: Staphylinidae
- Tribe: Athetini
- Genus: Leptostiba; Pace, 1985

Genus of beetles

Leptostiba is a genus of rove beetles, described in 1985 by the Italian entomologist, Roberto Pace.
