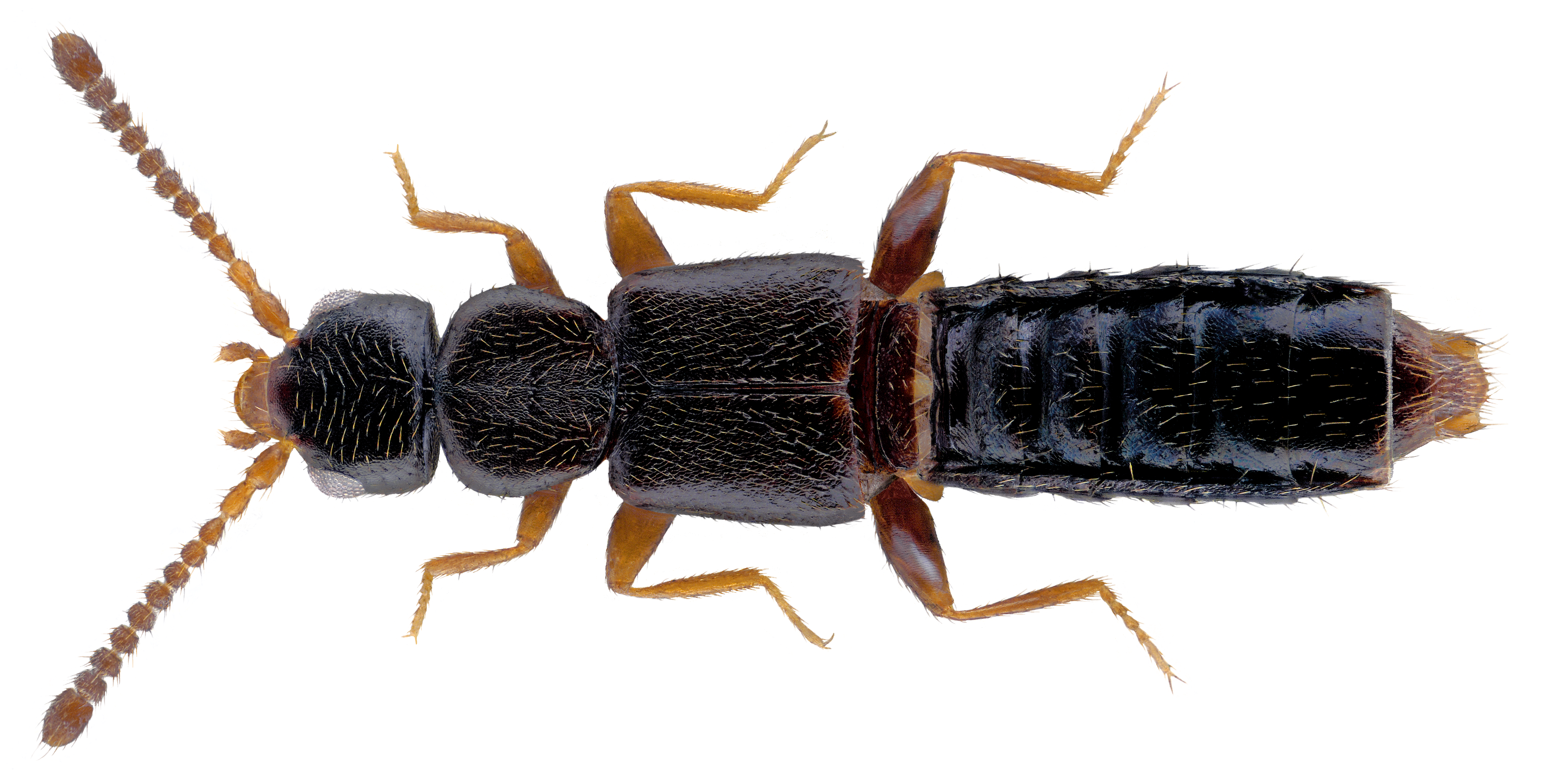
- Dadobia immersa

Scientific classification
- Kingdom: Animalia
- Phylum: Arthropoda
- Class: Insecta
- Order: Coleoptera
- Suborder: Polyphaga
- Infraorder: Staphyliniformia
- Family: Staphylinidae
- Genus: Dadobia; Thomson, 1858

= Dadobia =

Genus of beetles

Dadobia is a genus of beetles belonging to the family Staphylinidae.

The species of this genus are found in Europe.

Species:

- Dadobia immersa (Erichson, 1837)
