= Myrmedoniina =

Scientific classification
- Kingdom: Animalia
- Phylum: Arthropoda
- Class: Insecta
- Order: Coleoptera
- Suborder: Polyphaga
- Infraorder: Staphyliniformia
- Family: Staphylinidae
- Subfamily: Aleocharinae
- Tribe: Lomechusini
- Subtribe: Myrmedoniina; Thomson, 1867

Subtribe of beetles

Myrmedoniina is a large subtribe of rove beetles in the tribe Lomechusini, containing the following genera:

- Abothrus
- Acanthastilbus
- Aenictocleptis
- Aenictonia
- Aenictozyras
- Allardiana
- Allodinarda
- Amaurodera
- Amazoncharis
- Amblyoponiphilus
- Anepipleuronia
- Ankaratraella
- Anommatochara
- Anopsapterus
- Anthropeltodonia
- Apteranillus
- Apteraphaenops
- Astilbides
- Aulacocephalonia
- Borneozyras
- Bothriocrata
- Brachypteronia
- Brachysipalia
- Camerouniella
- Cantaloubeia
- Catarractodes
- Chaetosogonocephus
- Conradsia
- Creodonia
- Dabra
- Dabrosoma
- Degalliera
- Dentazyras
- Deroleptus
- Dinocoryna
- Dinusella
- Diplopleurus
- Doratoporus
- Dromacamatus
- Dromanomma
- Dromeciton
- Drugia
- Drusilla
- Drusillota
- Dysamblys
- Ecitana
- Ecitocala
- Ecitocerus
- Ecitocryptodes
- Ecitocryptus
- Ecitodiscus
- Ecitodonia
- Ecitoglossa
- Ecitonia
- Ecitonidia
- Ecitonilla
- Ecitopelta
- Ecitophila
- Ecitophiletus
- Ecitophrura
- Ecitoplectus
- Ecitopolites
- Ecitopora
- Ecitotyphlus
- Ecitoxenidia
- Euryalusa
- Eurydiotyphla
- Falagonia
- Falagonilla
- Gallardoia
- Gapia
- Gramminopleurus
- Gryptaulacus
- Haplomyrmemonia
- Heteroporus
- Homalodonia
- Kakodaimonia
- Katanganella
- Kenyanella
- Kolwezia
- Labidilla
- Labidoculex
- Lamprostenusa
- Leiorhopala
- Leleupidiella
- Leptogenoxenus
- Macrogerodonia
- Madecazyras
- Malaiseium
- Manikaella
- Maschwitzia
- Meronera
- Methneria
- Methnerotherium
- Microdonia
- Mimoplandria
- Monobothrus
- Myrmechusa
- Myrmechusina
- Myrmecopella
- Myrmecoxenia
- Myrmedonota
- Myrmigaster
- Myrmoecia
- Neocamacopalpus
- Neolara
- Neosmectonia
- Neowroughtonilla
- Ocyplanus
- Orphnebius
- Oxylidia
- Pachorhopala
- Papuanusa
- Paramyrmoecia
- Paraporus
- Parastilbus
- Pedinopleurus
- Periergopus
- Pheidologitonetes
- Philastilbus
- Philusina
- Platyastilbus
- Platyusa
- Plesiadda
- Porus
- Propinquitas
- Pseudastilbus
- Pseudodinusa
- Pseudodrusilla
- Pseudopachorhopala
- Pseudoporus
- Pseudothamiaraea
- Quarternio
- Rhopalybia
- Rhoptrodinarda
- Salutoporus
- Scotodonia
- Smectonia
- Stenocyplanus
- Stenopleurus
- Stichodonia
- Strabocephalium
- Synthoracastilbus
- Termitognathus
- Terrecorvonia
- Tetrabothrus
- Tetradonella
- Tetradonia
- Tetragnypeta
- Tetralophodes
- Thlibopleurus
- Thoracastilbus
- Thoracophagus
- Togpelenys
- Trachydonia
- Trachyota
- Trichodonia
- Tropiochara
- Typhlonusa
- Typhlozyras
- Urodonia
- Vertexprorogatio
- Wasmannina
- Wroughtonilla
- Xesturida
- Zyras
