= Myrmecophily in Staphylinidae =

Relationships of rove beetles with ants

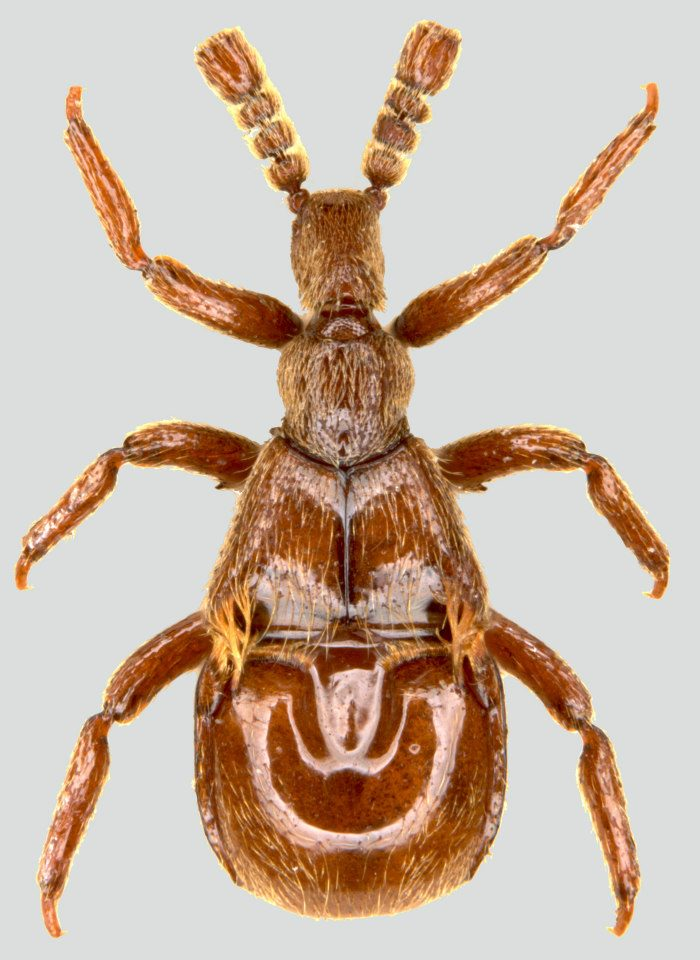
Myrmecophilous staphylinid Claviger testaceus.

Many species of Staphylinidae (commonly known as "rove beetles") have developed complex interspecies relationships with ants, known as myrmecophily. Rove beetles are among the most rich and diverse families of myrmecophilous beetles, with a wide variety of relationships with ants. Ant associations range from near free-living species which prey only on ants, to obligate inquilines of ants, which exhibit extreme morphological and chemical adaptations to the harsh environments of ant nests. Some species are fully integrated into the host colony, and are cleaned and fed by ants. Many of these, including species in tribe Clavigerini, are myrmecophagous, placating their hosts with glandular secretions while eating the brood.

== Taxonomy ==
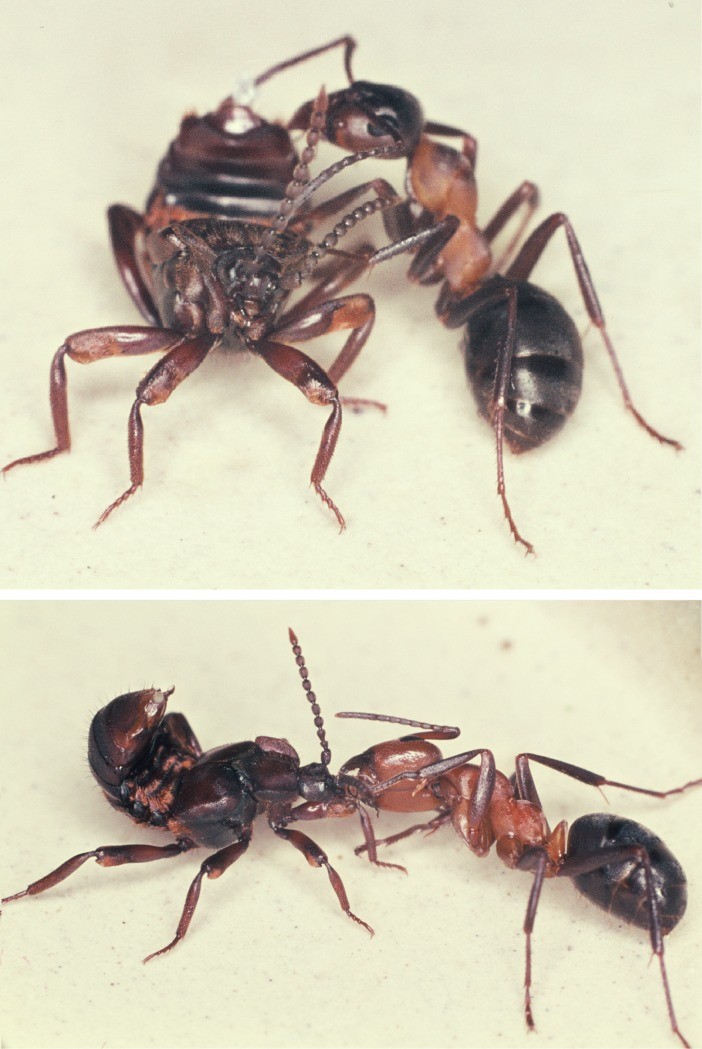
Interactions between Formica sanguinea and Lomechusoides strumosus

Staphylinidae is currently considered to be the largest family of beetles, with over 58,000 species described. As such, many myrmecophilous species are unknown. The majority of studied myrmecophilous rove beetles belong to the subfamily Aleocharinae, including the commonly studied genera Pella, Dinarda, Tetradonia, Ecitomorpha, Ecitophya, Atemeles, and Lomechusa, and to the subfamily Pselaphinae, which includes Claviger and Adranes. There are also representatives of Scydmaenidae, which includes 117 myrmecophilous species in 20 genera The Aleocharinae possess defensive glands on their abdomens, which are used in myrmecophilous species to prevent attacks by their host ant and in more extreme cases to integrate completely into the colony. Many Pselephinae species have trichomes, tufts of hairs which hold placating pheromones. Pselaphines have evolved trichomes independently at least four times, most notably in all members of Clavigerini, but also in Attapsenius and Songius genera.

== Ecology and behavior ==
Due to their large number and diversity, myrmecophilous rove beetles occupy an array of behaviors. Myrmecophilous interactions can be generalized into categories, in three of which staphylinids can be found. The synecthrans, or “persecuted guests,” the synoeketes, or “tolerated guests,” and the symphiles, or “true guests.”

=== Synecthrans ===
Synecthran staphylinids live on the periphery of the host colony and are not accepted into the colony. The majority are in the subfamily Aleocharinae, having defensive glands on their terminal abdominal segments. Species in this group, such as those in the genus Pella, commonly lay their eggs in the refuse heaps of their host ant, where the larvae feed on the discarded carcasses of ants. If detected by the host ant, the larvae enter a typical defense position, facing the ant with its abdomen tip raised. Usually this behavior results in the ant palpating the beetle's abdomen and stopping the attack. At least two members of Pella, P. funestus and P. humeralis, produce several of their host ant's alarm pheromones to avoid aggression. Other species, like members of Myrmechusa, Aenictonia, and Anommatochara, prey on raiding columns or on the nests of driver ants (Dorylus). Myrmechusa species attack the ants from the rear before pulling them from the main column. If pursued, they rapidly wave their abdomens through the air, releasing a noticeable scent. Ants encountering this scent seem disoriented and take almost 20 minutes to recover.

=== Synoeketes ===
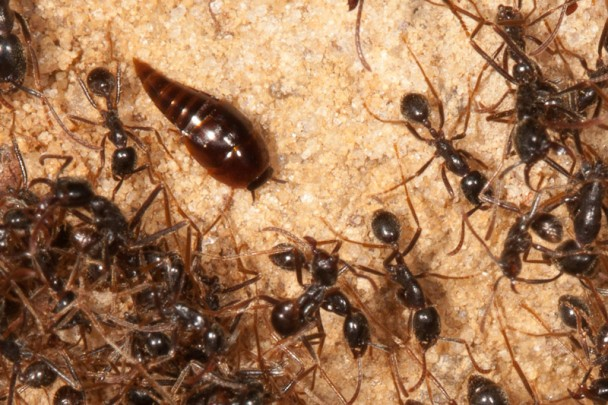
Loricate Vatesus sp. with host ants

Synoeketetic staphylinids live in close contact with their host ants but are not integrated into the colony. These species may be further categorized as neutral, mimetic, loricate, and symphiloid synoeketes. Neutral synoeketes ignore and are ignored by their host, but feed on refuse. There are few staphylinid neutral synoeketes, but some are found in the genus Athetini, which live in the debris and fungal chambers of leaf cutter ants (Atta). Mimetic synoeketes are myrmecoid, resembling their host ant morphologically. Many mimetic species are guests of driver ants, which are blind. Driver ants have strong senses of touch, suggesting mimics fool their hosts tactilely. It is also possible that mimicry may reduce predation from more visual animals, such as birds. Loricate, or “tear-drop shaped”, synoeketes are “defensive forms”. They typically exhibit long tapering bodies with broad thoraxes and smooth bodies, which prevent aggressing ants from gripping them. Symphiloids strongly resemble “true guests,” but are not fully integrated into the colony. They are often mimics, and in some species have developed trichomes. Syneoketes generally live on or inside of ant nests, where they feed on refuse and may steal food from their hosts. There is some overlap between synoeketes and other categories, especially in loricate species and synecthrans, and symphiloids and symphiles, where the behavior of “true guests” may be difficult to determine.

=== Symphiles ===
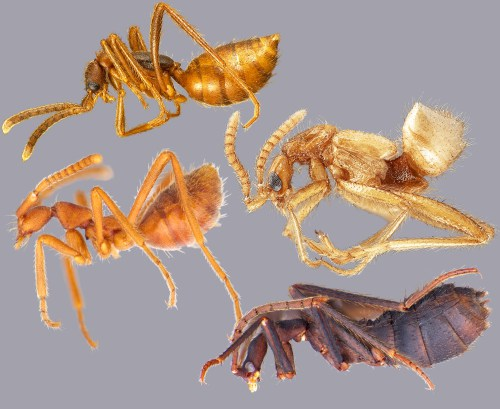
Myrmecoids Labidopullus ashei, Beyeria vespa, Pseudomimeciton sp., and Ecitophya bicolor

Symphilic staphylinids have been fully integrated into the host ant's society. Symphilic species have undergone complex morphological adaptations, many becoming myrmecoid. Most have developed trichomes, which secrete appeasement pheromones. The most extreme adaptations, found in members of tribe Clavigerini, include the reduction of mouthparts for trophallaxis and the fusing of many body and antennal segments. While most symphiles use antennal contact to stimulate food giving from their host, at least one member of Clavigerini, Claviger testaceus, secretes a chemical to induce regurgitation from its host ant Lasius flavus. Symphiles typically take on many roles in the colony, raising young, feeding and grooming adults, and helping transport food and larvae. Many staphylinids are capable of following ant pheromone trails, although they are not limited to following trails laid by their host ant. This allows symphiles of army ants to migrate with the colony. Most species are kleptoparasites fed by members of the ant colony, often through trophallaxis. Almost all species have also been observed feeding on the brood. Some of these species die if kept away from the appropriate ant colonies, and others lay their own eggs in ant brood galleries, effectively making them obligate parasites.

== Chemical mimicry ==
Chemical mimicry refers to the production of one species’ chemical signals by another species. Many myrmecophilous staphylinids have evolved chemical mimicry to deter or placate ants. Synecthrans, as non-tolerated guests, primarily produce defensive secretions. Pella species produce two compounds found in their host ant Lasius fuliginosus, undecane and sulcatone, which elicit aggressive and panic reactions respectively. Although it seems counterintuitive to release an aggressive alarm pheromone as a defense, the presence of sulcatone stops the aggression response to undecane. Ants exposed to the defensive secretion act less aggressively and avoid the odor.

For staphylinids accepted into the host colony, chemical mimicry is used more for camouflage. The majority of the chemical signals used are cuticular hydrocarbons, which are produced in the cuticle of the host ant at certain concentrations and are palpated to determine the identity of an ant. Species in close contact with their host ants are able to pick up the host's hydrocarbons and imitate the ant's hydrocarbon pattern, thus appearing in scent at least to be the same species as the host ant. As hydrocarbon patterns are specific to an individual colony, the rove beetles are generally restricted to one nest. The production of a new hydrocarbon pattern takes time, during which the beetle is vulnerable to detection and attack. Some species, such as Zyras comes, produce volatile pheromones as well as cuticular hydrocarbons, which may provide it more protection than contact based pheromones while traveling with its host in foraging trails.

== See also ==
- Myrmecophily
