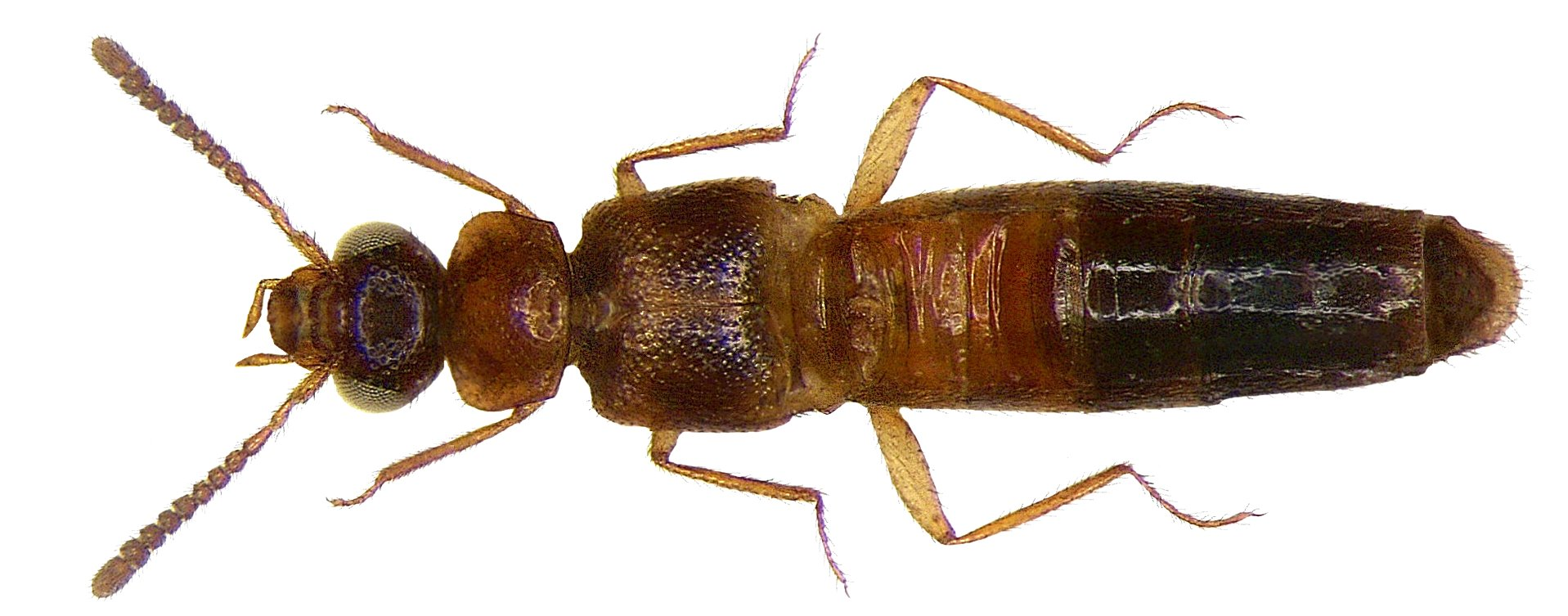
- Zyras tsavicola Pace, 2008

Scientific classification
- Domain: Eukaryota
- Kingdom: Animalia
- Phylum: Arthropoda
- Class: Insecta
- Order: Coleoptera
- Suborder: Polyphaga
- Infraorder: Staphyliniformia
- Family: Staphylinidae
- Subfamily: Aleocharinae
- Tribe: Lomechusini; Fleming, 1821

Synonyms
- Myrmedoniini Thomson, 1867; Zyrasini Bradley, 1930

= Lomechusini =

Tribe of beetles

Lomechusini is a tribe of rove beetles. It is generally small, but includes some fairly large genera such as Zyras.

== Subtribes ==
- Lomechusina
- Myrmedoniina

Genera incertae sedis

- Apalonia
- Bothronotoxenus
- Daccordiusa
- Ecitocala
- Pella
- Platyusa
- Trisporusa

== Genera ==
These 202 genera belong to the tribe Lomechusini:

- Abothrus Pace, 1991
- Acanthastilbus Cameron, 1939
- Aenictocleptis Kistner & Jacobson, 1975
- Aenictonia Wasmann, 1900
- Aenictophila Seevers, 1965
- Aenictozyras Kistner & Jacobson, 1975
- Allardiana Levasseur, 1966
- Allodinarda Wasmann, 1909
- Allodonota Pace, 2009
- Amaurodera Fauvel, 1905^{c g}
- Amazoncharis Pace, 1990
- Amblyoponiphilus Oke, 1933
- Anepipleuronia Bernhauer, 1929
- Ankaratraella Pace, 1999
- Anommatochara (Wasmann, 1915)
- Anopsapterus Lecoq, 1988
- Anthropeltodonia Bernhauer, 1937
- Apalonia Casey, 1906^{i c g b}
- Apteranillus Fairmaire, 1854
- Apteraphaenops Jeannel, 1907
- Asheidium Santiago-Jiménez, 2010
- Astilbides Wasmann, 1916
- Athexenia Pace, 2000
- Aulacocephalonia (Bernhauer, 1928)
- Borneozyras Pace, 2002
- Bothriocrata Pace, 1993
- Brachypteronia Bernhauer, 1929
- Brachysipalia (Blackwelder, 1952)
- Camerouniella Levasseur, 1967
- Cantaloubeia Levasseur, 1966
- Catarractodes Strand, 1928
- Cephaplakoxena Pace, 1998^{c g}
- Conradsia Bernhauer, 1942
- Creodonia (Wasmann, 1915)
- Dabra Olliff, 1886
- Dabrosoma Lea, 1910
- Daccordiusa Pace, 2005
- Degalliera Kistner, 1993
- Delgadoidium Santiago-Jiménez, 2010
- Dentazyras Kistner, 1997
- Deroleptus (Bernhauer, 1915)
- Dinocoryna Casey, 1893^{i c g b}
- Dinusella Bernhauer, 1908
- Diplopleurus Bernhauer, 1915^{c g}
- Doratoporus Wasmann, 1893
- Dromacamatus Bruch, 1933
- Dromanomma Wasmann, 1916
- Dromeciton Fauvel, 1904
- Drugia Blackwelder, 1952
- Drusilla Leach in Samouelle, 1819^{i c g b}
- Drusillota Casey, 1906
- Dysamblys Pace, 1999
- Ecitana Seevers, 1965
- Ecitocala Frank in Frank and Thomas, 1981^{i c g}
- Ecitocerus Borgmeier, 1949
- Ecitocryptodes Seevers, 1965
- Ecitocryptus Borgmeier, 1930
- Ecitodiscus Borgmeier, 1949
- Ecitodonia Seevers, 1965
- Ecitoglossa Borgmeier, 1958
- Ecitonia Wasmann, 1894
- Ecitonilla Wasmann, 1894
- Ecitopelta Borgmeier, 1949
- Ecitophila Wasmann, 1890
- Ecitophiletus Borgmeier, 1932
- Ecitophrura Reichensperger, 1939
- Ecitoplectus Borgmeier, 1931
- Ecitopolites Borgmeier, 1949
- Ecitotyphlus Borgmeier, 1949
- Ecitoxenidia Wasmann, 1909^{i c g b}
- Eidozyras Pace, 2010
- Euryalusa Pace, 1984
- Eurydiotyphla Pace, 1986
- Eurydonota Pace, 2009
- Falagonia Sharp, 1883
- Falagonilla Reichensperger, 1939
- Gallardoia Bruch, 1924
- Gapia Blackwelder, 1952
- Glossodonota Pace, 2009
- Gramminopleurus Bernhauer, 1942
- Gryptaulacus (Bernhauer, 1937)
- Haplomyrmemonia Pace, 1986
- Havilandoxenus Kistner, 1971
- Heteroporus Cameron, 1939
- Hodotermophilus Naomi & Terayama, 1986
- Homalodonia (Bernhauer, 1936)
- Iheringocantharus Bernhauer, 1912
- Kakodaimonia Bernhauer, 1929
- Katanganella Levasseur, 1966
- Kenyanella Levasseur, 1966
- Kolwezia Levasseur, 1966
- Kompsodonota Pace, 2009
- Labidilla Borgmeier, 1949
- Labidoculex Reichensperger, 1936
- Leleupidiella Jarrige, 1953
- Leptogenonia Maruyama, 2010
- Leptogenopapus Hlaváč & Janda, 2009
- Leptogenoxenus Kistner, 1975
- Limulodilla Kistner, 1970
- Lomechusa Gravenhorst, 1806^{c g}
- Lomechusoides Tottenham, 1939^{c g}
- Longipedisymbia Kistner, 1970
- Longipedoxenus Kistner, 1970
- Lornechusula Brauns, 1925
- Macrogerodonia (Bernhauer, 1941)
- Madecazyras Scheerpeltz, 1961
- Malaiseium Scheerpeltz, 1965
- Malaybergius Kistner, 1993
- Manausdota Pace, 2008
- Manikaella Levasseur, 1967
- Maschwitzia Kistner, 1989
- Methneria Bernhauer, 1915
- Methnerotherium Bernhauer, 1929
- Microdonia Casey, 1893^{i c g b}
- Mimaenictus Kistner & Jacobson, 1975
- Mimoplandria Cameron, 1950
- Monobothrus Pace, 1990
- Myrmechusa Wasmann, 1908
- Myrmechusina Cameron, 1926
- Myrmecopella Kistner & McNairn, 1991
- Myrmecoxenia Lynch, 1884
- Myrmedonota Cameron, 1920^{g b}
- Myrmoecia Mulsant & Rey, 1874^{i c g b}
- Neocamacopalpus Klimaszewski, 1982
- Neosmectonia Jacobson & Kistner, 1983
- Neowroughtonilla Kistner, 1989
- Newtonidium Santiago-Jiménez, 2010
- Ocyplanus Fauvel, 1899
- Orphnebius Motschulsky, 1858^{c g}
- Oxylidia Pace, 1993
- Pachorhopala (Bernhauer, 1915)
- Papuanusa Pace, 2000
- Paramyrmoecia (Scheerpeltz, 1974)
- Paraporus Bernhauer, 1929
- Parastilbus Bernhauer, 1933
- Parawroughtonilla Maruyama, 2010
- Pedinopleurus Cameron, 1939^{c g}
- Pella Stephens, 1835^{i c g b}
- Peltodonia (Bernhauer, 1936)
- Periergopus Fenyes, 1921
- Pheidologitonetes Cameron, 1939
- Philastilbus Bernhauer, 1929
- Philusina Wasmann, 1893
- Platyastilbus Scheerpeltz, 1965
- Platyusa Casey, 1885^{i c g b}
- Plesiadda Pace, 1986
- Porus Westwood, 1840
- Procantonnetia Kistner & Jacobson, 1975
- Propinquitas Last, 1977
- Pseudastilbus Cameron, 1950
- Pseudodinusa Bernhauer, 1912
- Pseudodrusilla Bernhauer, 1933
- Pseudofalagonia Santiago-Jiménez, 2010
- Pseudopachorhopala Levasseur, 1966
- Pseudoporus Wasmann, 1893
- Pseudothamiaraea Cameron, 1923
- Quarternio Last, 1963
- Rhopalybia Cameron, 1937
- Rhoptrodinarda Brauns, 1914
- Salutoporus Last, 1977
- Scotodonia Wasmann, 1894
- Serikodonota Pace, 2009
- Sharpidium Santiago-Jiménez, 2010
- Smectonia Patrizi, 1948
- Stenocyplanus Jacobson & Kistner, 1983
- Stenopleurus Kistner, 1997
- Steysborgia Kistner & Jacobson, 1975
- Stichodonia (Bernhauer, 1928)
- Strabocephalium Bernhauer, 1911
- Sumatrilla Pace, 2010
- Synthoracastilbus Scheerpeltz, 1957
- Termitognathus Borgmeier, 1959
- Termitonusa Borgmeier, 1950
- Termitophagus Silvestri, 1946
- Termitosymbia Seevers, 1957
- Termitozyras Seevers, 1957
- Termophidoholus Naomi & Hirono, 1996^{c g}
- Terrecorvonia Last, 1962
- Tetrabothrus Bernhauer, 1915^{c g}
- Tetradonella Jacobson & Kistner, 1998
- Tetradonia Wasmann, 1894^{i c g b}
- Tetralophodes Bernhauer, 1922
- Thayeridium Santiago-Jiménez, 2010
- Thlibopleurus Bernhauer, 1915
- Thoracastilbus Scheerpeltz, 1957
- Togpelenys Kistner, 1989
- Trachydonia (Bernhauer, 1928)
- Trachyota Casey, 1906^{i c g}
- Trichodonia Wasmann, 1916
- Trisporusa Pace, 2005
- Tropiochara Bernhauer, 1937
- Turcizyras Maruyama, 2006
- Typhlonusa Borgmeier, 1958
- Typhlozyras Jeannel, 1960
- Vertexprorogatio Kistner, 2004
- Wasmannina Mann, 1925
- Weissflogia Kistner, 1997
- Witteia Maruyama & von Beeren, 2010
- Wroughtonilla Wasmann, 1899
- Xenodusa Wasmann, 1894^{i c g b}
- Xesturida Casey, 1906^{i c g b}
- Zyras Stephens, 1835^{i c g b}
- Zyratheta Pace, 2010

Data sources: i = ITIS, c = Catalogue of Life, g = GBIF, b = Bugguide.net
