= Lomechusina =

Scientific classification
- Kingdom: Animalia
- Phylum: Arthropoda
- Clade: Pancrustacea
- Class: Insecta
- Order: Coleoptera
- Suborder: Polyphaga
- Infraorder: Staphyliniformia
- Family: Staphylinidae
- Tribe: Lomechusini
- Subtribe: Lomechusina; Fleming, 1821

Lomechusina is a subtribe of rove beetles in the tribe Lomechusini. It was first described by Fleming in 1821. It contains 3 genera and 58 species.

== Genera ==
- Lomechusa
- Lomechusoides
- Xenodusa
