= Aenictoteratini =

Scientific classification
- Domain: Eukaryota
- Kingdom: Animalia
- Phylum: Arthropoda
- Class: Insecta
- Order: Coleoptera
- Suborder: Polyphaga
- Infraorder: Staphyliniformia
- Family: Staphylinidae
- Subfamily: Aleocharinae
- Tribe: Aenictoteratini; Kistner, 1993

Genera
- Aenictobia Seevers, 1953; Aenictocupidus Kistner, 1993; Aenictolixa Kistner, 2009; Aenictoteras Wheeler, 1932; Dentaphila Kistner, 1997; Giraffaenictus Maruyama, 2008; Rosciszewskia Kistner, 1993; Tobiisima Kistner, 1997; Trichotobia Kistner, 1997; Weiria Ashe, 2003

Synonyms
- Aenictobiini

Tribe of beetles

Aenictoteratini is a myrmecophilous tribe of rove beetles in the subfamily Aleocharinae which contains 10 genera, 7 of which are monotypic. In total, there are 17 species currently listed as Aenictoteratini.

== Distribution ==
Most Aenictoteratini genera are found in East Asia, specifically China, Indonesia, Malaysia, the Philippines, Thailand, and Vietnam, while Weiria australis (Ashe, 2003) is the only species known from Australia. All species are found inside of nests of the ant genus Aenictus.

== Description ==
Members of this tribe are highly adapted to life among ants, with body shapes resembling those of their hosts.

== Taxonomy ==
Many genera placed in Aenictoteratini when the tribe was created in 1993 have subsequently been moved to the Myrmedoniina, a subtribe of Lomechusini, after phylogenetic analyses revealed that the group was not monophyletic. Many of the characteristics first used to define the tribe, such as an antlike "pseudo-gaster" narrowed abdomen, can be found in other lineages of myrmecophilous Aleocharinae that resemble ants, making this a case of convergent evolution.
