= Zyras artemis =

Stylotermes halumicus

Scientific classification
- Kingdom: Animalia
- Phylum: Arthropoda
- Class: Insecta
- Order: Coleoptera
- Suborder: Polyphaga
- Infraorder: Staphyliniformia
- Family: Staphylinidae
- Genus: Zyras
- Species: Z. artemis

Binomial name
- Zyras artemis Liang, Maruyama, and Li, 2017

Species of rove beetle from Taiwan

Zyras artemis is a species of beetle in the family Staphylinidae and subgenus Diaulaconia described by Wei-Ren Liang, Munetoshi Maruyama, and Hou-Feng Li in 2017.

The assignment of Zyras artemis to the subgenus Diaulaconia is based on the comparison of female spermatheca, male aedeagus, and male secondary characters. In a recent study, it was found to be associated with the fungus-growing termite Odontotermes formosanus and to show meticulous predatory behavior.
