= Dinocoryna arizonensis =

Scientific classification
- Kingdom: Animalia
- Phylum: Arthropoda
- Clade: Pancrustacea
- Class: Insecta
- Order: Coleoptera
- Suborder: Polyphaga
- Infraorder: Staphyliniformia
- Family: Staphylinidae
- Subfamily: Aleocharinae
- Tribe: Lomechusini
- Genus: Dinocoryna
- Species: D. arizonensis

Binomial name
- Dinocoryna arizonensis Seevers, 1959

Species of beetle

Dinocoryna arizonensis is a species in the family Staphylinidae ("rove beetles"), in the order Coleoptera ("beetles").

It is found in North America. It is a known associate of Neivamyrmex ants.
