= Pella fauveli =

Scientific classification
- Kingdom: Animalia
- Phylum: Arthropoda
- Class: Insecta
- Order: Coleoptera
- Suborder: Polyphaga
- Infraorder: Staphyliniformia
- Family: Staphylinidae
- Genus: Pella
- Species: P. fauveli

Binomial name
- Pella fauveli (Sharp, 1883)

Species of beetle

Pella fauveli is a species of rove beetle in the family Staphylinidae. It is found in Central America and North America.
