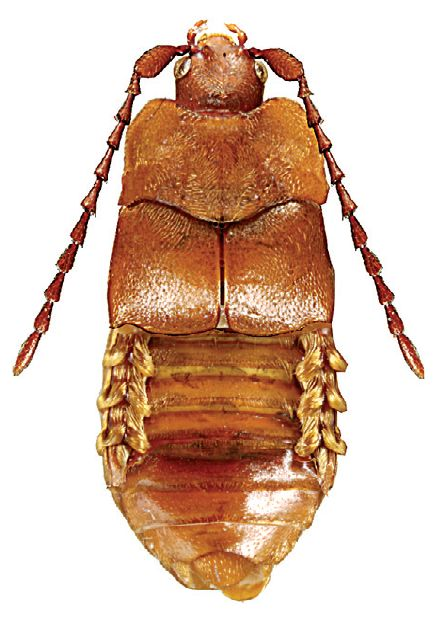

Scientific classification
- Kingdom: Animalia
- Phylum: Arthropoda
- Class: Insecta
- Order: Coleoptera
- Suborder: Polyphaga
- Infraorder: Staphyliniformia
- Family: Staphylinidae
- Genus: Xenodusa
- Species: X. reflexa

Binomial name
- Xenodusa reflexa (Walker, 1866)

= Xenodusa reflexa =

Species of beetle

Xenodusa reflexa is a species of rove beetle in the family Staphylinidae. It is found in North America.
