= Apalonia =

Scientific classification
- Kingdom: Animalia
- Phylum: Arthropoda
- Class: Insecta
- Order: Coleoptera
- Suborder: Polyphaga
- Infraorder: Staphyliniformia
- Family: Staphylinidae
- Tribe: Lomechusini
- Genus: Apalonia; Casey, 1906

Genus of beetles

Apalonia is a genus of rove beetles in the family Staphylinidae. There are at least 40 described species in Apalonia.

== Species ==
These 43 species belong to the genus Apalonia:

- Apalonia alboterminalis Pace, 2015^{g}
- Apalonia antestricta Pace, 2015^{g}
- Apalonia approuagensis Pace, 2015^{g}
- Apalonia athetoides Pace, 2015^{g}
- Apalonia bulbufuscata Pace, 2015^{g}
- Apalonia cayennensis Pace, 2015^{g}
- Apalonia cayennicola Pace, 2015^{g}
- Apalonia complicata Pace, 2015^{g}
- Apalonia comtensis Pace, 2015^{g}
- Apalonia confundibilis Pace, 2015^{g}
- Apalonia courciboensis Pace, 2015^{g}
- Apalonia curvata Pace, 2015^{g}
- Apalonia dimidiaticornis Pace, 2015^{g}
- Apalonia falx Pace, 2015^{g}
- Apalonia gnypetoides Pace, 2015^{g}
- Apalonia guyanensis Pace, 2015^{g}
- Apalonia guycurticornis Pace, 2015^{g}
- Apalonia guyfemoralis Pace, 2015^{g}
- Apalonia guyimpressicollis Pace, 2015^{g}
- Apalonia guymaculiventris Pace, 2015^{g}
- Apalonia guyplatyceps Pace, 2015^{g}
- Apalonia guyrorida Pace, 2015^{g}
- Apalonia guysimilis Pace, 2015^{g}
- Apalonia manaensis Pace, 2015^{g}
- Apalonia microdotoides Pace, 2015^{g}
- Apalonia mima Pace, 2015^{g}
- Apalonia mimopaca Pace, 2015^{g}
- Apalonia nana Pace, 2015^{g}
- Apalonia opaca Pace, 2015^{g}
- Apalonia ovapockensis Pace, 2015^{g}
- Apalonia perconfundibilis Pace, 2015^{g}
- Apalonia perdentata Pace, 2015^{g}
- Apalonia saramakensis Pace, 2015^{g}
- Apalonia satanoides Pace, 2015^{g}
- Apalonia semiopaca Pace, 2015^{g}
- Apalonia semiopacoides Pace, 2015^{g}
- Apalonia semiscapa (Pace, 1987)^{g}
- Apalonia seticornis Casey, 1906^{i c g b}
- Apalonia singularitheca Pace, 2015^{g}
- Apalonia struyvei Pace, 2015^{g}
- Apalonia subcayennensis Pace, 2015^{g}
- Apalonia tuberculitheca Pace, 2015^{g}
- Apalonia uniformis Pace, 2015^{g}

Data sources: i = ITIS, c = Catalogue of Life, g = GBIF, b = Bugguide.net
