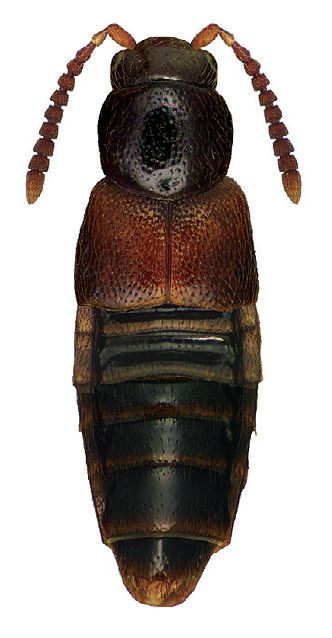
- Zyras obliquus

Conservation status
- Secure (NatureServe)

Scientific classification
- Kingdom: Animalia
- Phylum: Arthropoda
- Class: Insecta
- Order: Coleoptera
- Suborder: Polyphaga
- Infraorder: Staphyliniformia
- Family: Staphylinidae
- Genus: Zyras
- Species: Z. obliquus

Binomial name
- Zyras obliquus (Casey, 1893)

Synonyms
- Myrmedonia obliqua Casey, 1893; Zyras pseudohaworthi Klimaszewski, 2002

= Zyras obliquus =

Species of beetle

Zyras obliquus is a species of rove beetle in the family Staphylinidae. It is found in North America transcontinentally from northern United States to the southern half of Canada. It has been mixed with the closely related Palearctic species Zyras haworthi.

Zyras obliquus measure 4.0–6.5 mm (0.16–0.26 in) in length. Adults have been collected in both coniferous and deciduous forests in June–August.
