= Ecitonidia =

Scientific classification
- Kingdom: Animalia
- Phylum: Arthropoda
- Clade: Pancrustacea
- Class: Insecta
- Order: Coleoptera
- Suborder: Polyphaga
- Infraorder: Staphyliniformia
- Family: Staphylinidae
- Tribe: Lomechusini
- Genus: Ecitonidia; Wasmann, 1900

Genus of beetles

Ecitonidia is a genus of rove beetles in the family Staphylinidae. There is at least one described species in Ecitonidia, E. wheeleri.
