= Myrmoecia lauta =

Scientific classification
- Kingdom: Animalia
- Phylum: Arthropoda
- Clade: Pancrustacea
- Class: Insecta
- Order: Coleoptera
- Suborder: Polyphaga
- Infraorder: Staphyliniformia
- Family: Staphylinidae
- Genus: Myrmoecia
- Species: M. lauta

Binomial name
- Myrmoecia lauta (Casey, 1893)

Species of beetle

Myrmoecia lauta is a species of rove beetle in the family Staphylinidae. It is found in North America.
