= Adranes lecontei =

Scientific classification
- Kingdom: Animalia
- Phylum: Arthropoda
- Class: Insecta
- Order: Coleoptera
- Suborder: Polyphaga
- Infraorder: Staphyliniformia
- Family: Staphylinidae
- Genus: Adranes
- Species: A. lecontei

Binomial name
- Adranes lecontei Brendel, 1865

Species of beetle

Adranes lecontei is a species of ant-loving beetle in the family Staphylinidae. It is found in North America.
