= Microdonia nitidiventris =

Scientific classification
- Kingdom: Animalia
- Phylum: Arthropoda
- Class: Insecta
- Order: Coleoptera
- Suborder: Polyphaga
- Infraorder: Staphyliniformia
- Family: Staphylinidae
- Genus: Microdonia
- Species: M. nitidiventris

Binomial name
- Microdonia nitidiventris (Brues, 1904)

Species of beetle

Microdonia nitidiventris is a species of rove beetle in the family Staphylinidae. It is found in Central America and North America.
