= Zyras rudis =

Scientific classification
- Kingdom: Animalia
- Phylum: Arthropoda
- Class: Insecta
- Order: Coleoptera
- Suborder: Polyphaga
- Infraorder: Staphyliniformia
- Family: Staphylinidae
- Genus: Zyras
- Species: Z. rudis

Binomial name
- Zyras rudis (LeConte, 1866)

Synonyms
- Myrmedonia rudis LeConte, 1866

Species of beetle

Zyras rudis is a species of rove beetle in the family Staphylinidae. It is endemic to the United States with records from Washington, D.C. (its type locality) and Arizona.

Adults measure 5–5.5 mm (0.20–0.22 in) in length.
