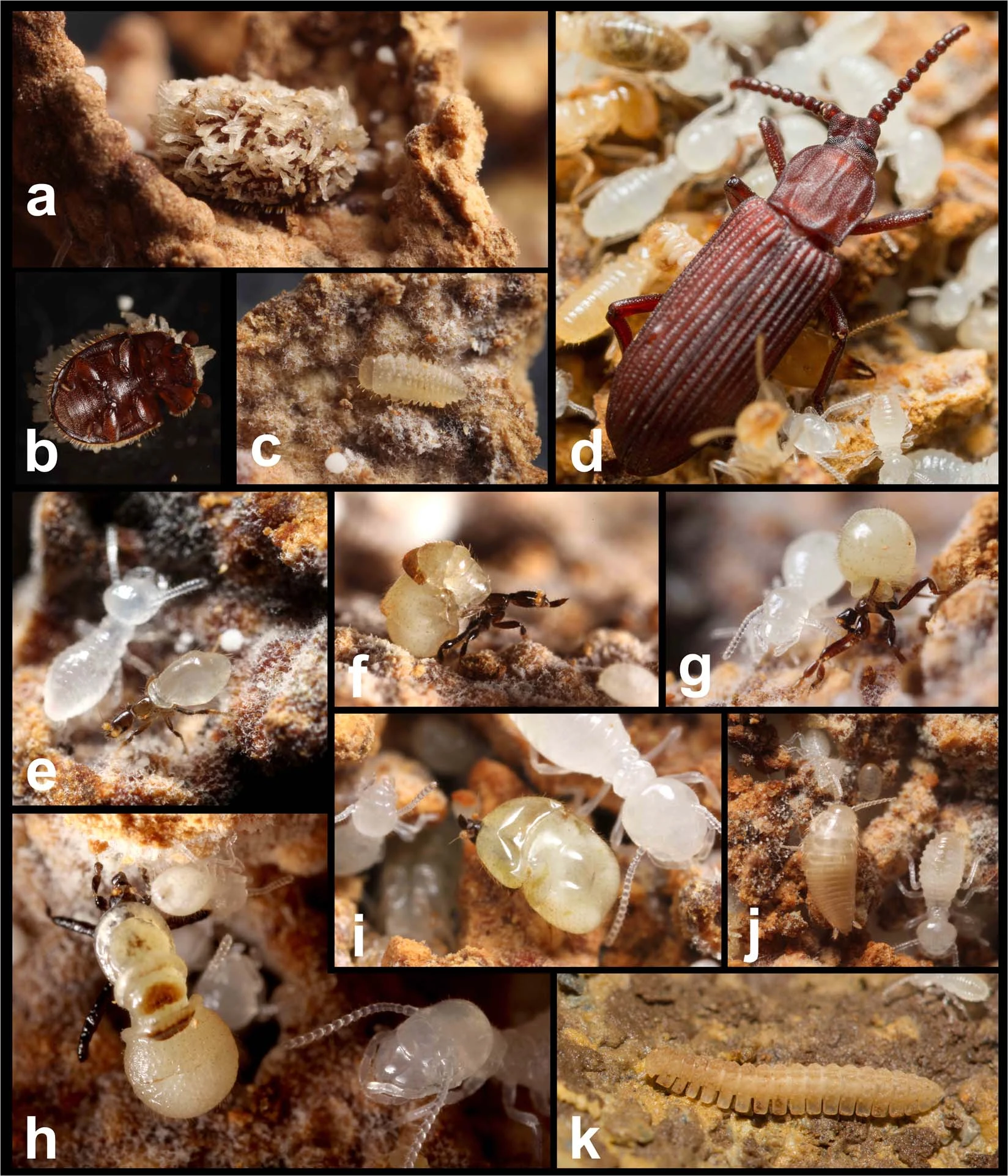
- Inquilines of Odontotermes formosanus. (a) Cycloxenus sp. (Coleoptera: Cerylonidae), adult in dorsal view; (b) Cycloxenus sp., adult in ventral view; (c) larva of Cycloxenus sp.; (d) Ziaelas formosanus (Coleoptera: Tenebrionidae); (e) Clitelloxenia audreyae (Diptera: Phoridae); (f) Clitelloxenia formosana (Diptera: Phoridae); (g) Selenophora shimaidai (Diptera: Phoridae); (h) Pseudotermitoxenia nitobei (Diptera: Phoridae); (i) Horologiphora sinensis (Diptera: Phoridae); (j) Platystylea sp. (Thysanura: Nicoletiidae); (k) millipede (Diplopoda: Polydesmida: Pyrgodesmidae).

Scientific classification
- Kingdom: Animalia
- Phylum: Arthropoda
- Clade: Pancrustacea
- Class: Insecta
- Order: Blattodea
- Infraorder: Isoptera
- Family: Termitidae
- Genus: Odontotermes
- Species: O. formosanus

Binomial name
- Odontotermes formosanus (Shiraki, 1909)

Synonyms
- Termes formosana

= Odontotermes formosanus =

Species of termite

Odontotermes formosanus is a species of fungus-growing termite in the family Termitidae. It is native to southeastern Asia and was first described from Taiwan (then called Formosa). This termite cultivates a symbiotic fungus in a special chamber in the nest. Workers and soldiers gather vegetable detritus which they bring back to the colony, chewing the material to a pulp to make a suitable substrate on which to grow the fungus.

== Distribution and habitat ==
Odontotermes formosanus has a widespread distribution in southeastern Asia, its range including Japan, Taiwan, China, Vietnam, Thailand, Myanmar and India. It is a common subterranean species and is a pest of forests, plantations and crops. It also forms nests in earthen dams, and can cause dams and dykes to collapse, as well as doing damage to the pipework.

It should not be confused with the worldwide invasive species Coptotermes formosanus.

== The colony ==
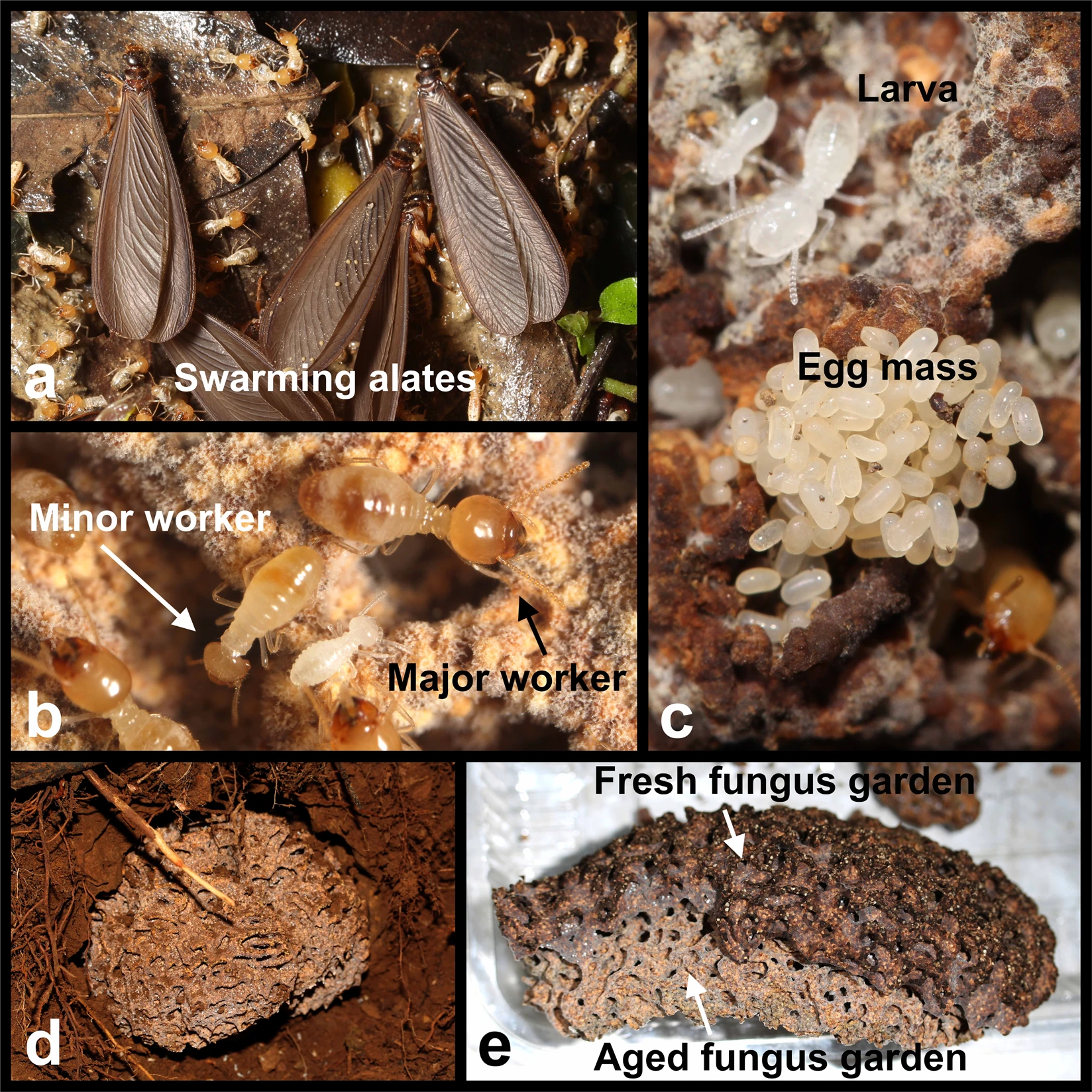
Major components of Odontotermes formosanus agriculture. (a) Swarming alates; (b) minor and major workers; (c) termite larvae and egg mass; (d) a fungus comb in situ in the soil, part of a large nest of O. formosanus; (e) an O. formosanus fungus garden (note that the dark upper layer consists of fresh plant material and the pale lower layer is aged and decomposed material).

A colony of Odontotermes formosanus consists of a number of large and small chambers forming the nest, linked by a complex of galleries; the queen is housed in one large chamber, and the main fungus comb occupies another, and there are several subsidiary fungus comb chambers nearby.

== Ecology ==
Like other members of the subfamily Macrotermitinae, Odontotermes formosanus have a symbiosis with a fungus in the genus Termitomyces which they cultivate in the nest. The older termites leave the nest to forage for suitable materials to use as substrate for the fungus. Younger workers remain in the nest where they chew up plant material brought in by the foragers, which becomes mixed with asexual spores of the fungus and bacteria in their gut. The resulting faeces are then deposited on the fungal comb. Older parts of the comb are then eaten by the termites.

The termites travel as far as 35 m (115 ft) from the nest in their search for suitable materials to collect for their fungus comb. Searching is initiated by workers, or sometimes soldiers, which leave the nest area to forage in the open, often at night. The first explorers travel slowly and in due course returns to the nest, whether or not they have found food. The searching worker repeatedly touches the tip of its abdomen to the substrate to lay down a pheromone trail to guide other termites. The secretion produced contains two chemicals mixed together, and by varying the proportions of each chemical deposited, the explorers can provide extra information to the recipient termites, which are following the trail. When a suitable source is found, a circular gallery is built around it to ease its collection. Mud is used to make tubes over the trail along which the termites travel to and fro.

It is associated with Zyras artemis, a Taiwanese species of rove beetle.
