= Ecitoxenidia alabamae =

Scientific classification
- Kingdom: Animalia
- Phylum: Arthropoda
- Class: Insecta
- Order: Coleoptera
- Suborder: Polyphaga
- Infraorder: Staphyliniformia
- Family: Staphylinidae
- Genus: Ecitoxenidia
- Species: E. alabamae

Binomial name
- Ecitoxenidia alabamae Seevers, 1959

Species of beetle

Ecitoxenidia alabamae is a species of rove beetle in the family Staphylinidae. It is found in North America.
