= Adranes coecus =

Scientific classification
- Kingdom: Animalia
- Phylum: Arthropoda
- Class: Insecta
- Order: Coleoptera
- Suborder: Polyphaga
- Infraorder: Staphyliniformia
- Family: Staphylinidae
- Genus: Adranes
- Species: A. coecus

Binomial name
- Adranes coecus LeConte, 1849

Species of beetle

Adranes coecus is a species of ant-loving beetle in the family Staphylinidae, found in North America.
