= Pella loricata =

Scientific classification
- Kingdom: Animalia
- Phylum: Arthropoda
- Class: Insecta
- Order: Coleoptera
- Suborder: Polyphaga
- Infraorder: Staphyliniformia
- Family: Staphylinidae
- Genus: Pella
- Species: P. loricata

Binomial name
- Pella loricata (Casey, 1893)

Species of beetle

Pella loricata is a species of rove beetle in the family Staphylinidae. It is found in North America.
