= Apalonia seticornis =

Scientific classification
- Kingdom: Animalia
- Phylum: Arthropoda
- Class: Insecta
- Order: Coleoptera
- Suborder: Polyphaga
- Infraorder: Staphyliniformia
- Family: Staphylinidae
- Genus: Apalonia
- Species: A. seticornis

Binomial name
- Apalonia seticornis Casey, 1906

Species of beetle

Apalonia seticornis is a species of rove beetle in the family Staphylinidae. It is found in North America.
