= Pella carolina =

Scientific classification
- Kingdom: Animalia
- Phylum: Arthropoda
- Class: Insecta
- Order: Coleoptera
- Suborder: Polyphaga
- Infraorder: Staphyliniformia
- Family: Staphylinidae
- Genus: Pella
- Species: P. carolina

Binomial name
- Pella carolina (Casey, 1911)

Species of beetle

Pella carolina is a species of rove beetle in the genus Pella in the subfamily Aleocharinae. It was discovered by Casey in 1911.
