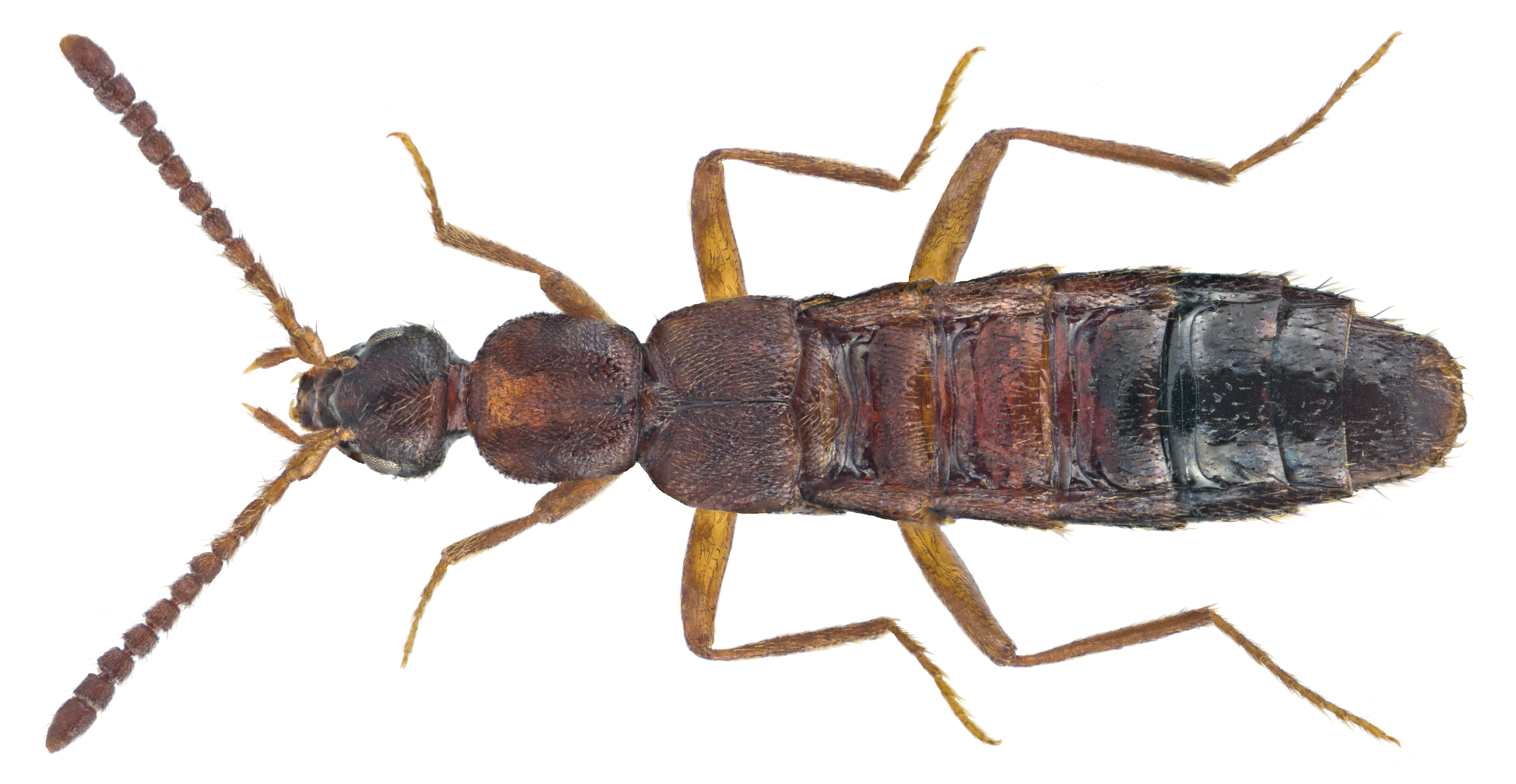

Scientific classification
- Kingdom: Animalia
- Phylum: Arthropoda
- Clade: Pancrustacea
- Class: Insecta
- Order: Coleoptera
- Suborder: Polyphaga
- Infraorder: Staphyliniformia
- Family: Staphylinidae
- Genus: Drusilla
- Species: D. canaliculata

Binomial name
- Drusilla canaliculata (Fabricius, 1787)

= Drusilla canaliculata =

Species of beetle

Drusilla canaliculata is a species of rove beetle in the family Staphylinidae. It is found in Europe and Northern Asia (excluding China) and North America.
