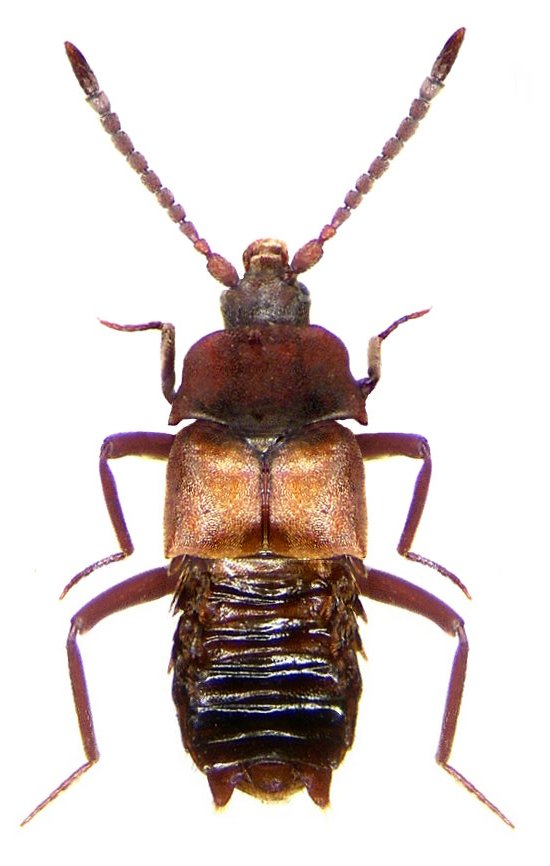
- Adult

Scientific classification
- Domain: Eukaryota
- Kingdom: Animalia
- Phylum: Arthropoda
- Class: Insecta
- Order: Coleoptera
- Suborder: Polyphaga
- Infraorder: Staphyliniformia
- Family: Staphylinidae
- Genus: Lomechusa
- Species: L. pubicollis

Binomial name
- Lomechusa pubicollis Brisout de Barneville, 1860

Synonyms
- Atemeles pubicollis Brisout

= Lomechusa pubicollis =

Species of beetle

Lomechusa pubicollis is a species of rove beetle in the family Staphylinidae. It is unusual in that its larvae develop in the nests of one species of ant and the immature adults overwinter in the nest of another species of ant. These beetles are highly specialised myrmecophiles, tricking the ants into caring for them, and one of about 125 species of invertebrates that rely on spending part of their lives in and around the nests of red wood ants.

== Life cycle ==
The larvae of Lomechusa pubicollis live inside colonies of the European red wood ant Formica polyctena, or the red wood ant Formica rufa. Each larva produces a glandular secretion which persuades worker ants to groom it. The beetle larva rears up in a manner that imitates the begging behaviour of an ant larva, touching the worker ant on its mouthparts, which stimulates it to regurgitate a drop of liquid food. The beetle larva also feeds on ant larvae as well as smaller larvae of its own species. When fully developed, the beetle larva pupates in the ant colony.

When the adult beetle emerges from the pupa, it begs for food one more time before making its way to the surface of the ground. The red wood ant is inactive in winter and the immature beetle leaves its nest. At this stage it is positively attracted to light which encourages it to move into more open areas of meadowland. For a period of about two weeks it is sensitive to the odour of myrmicine ants and moves towards them. It favours ants in the genus Myrmica, but failing them, it is attracted by other genera such as Tetramorium and Solenopsis. When it has found a suitable nest, the beetle produces secretions from an "appeasement gland" which discourage the ants from attacking it. Further attractant secretions from other glands stimulate the ants to carry the beetle into their nest. Here it spends the winter, begging for food and being fed by the ants. When spring comes it leaves the ant nest and, now sexually mature, seeks out the nest of a red wood ant.
