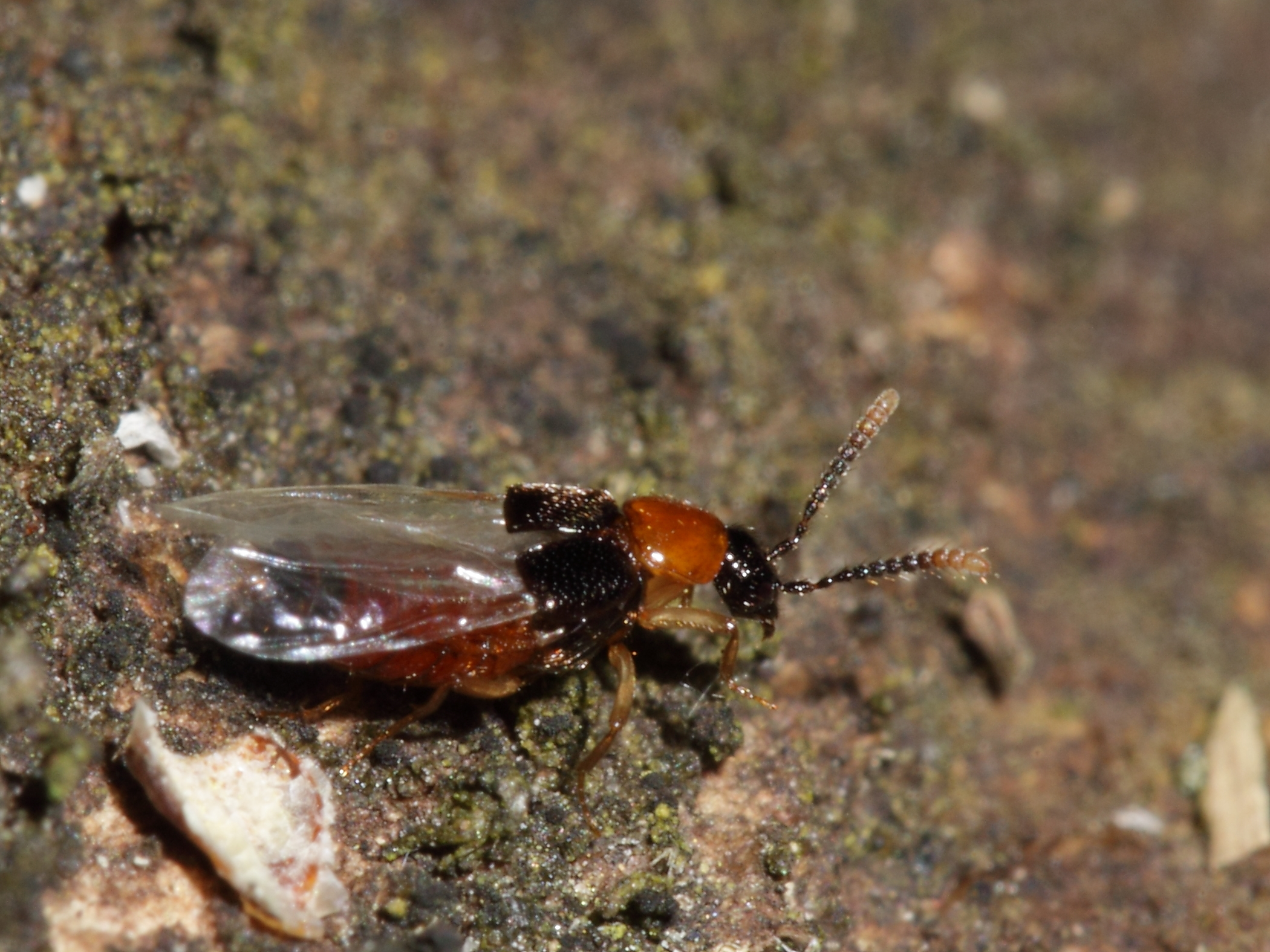

Scientific classification
- Kingdom: Animalia
- Phylum: Arthropoda
- Class: Insecta
- Order: Coleoptera
- Suborder: Polyphaga
- Infraorder: Staphyliniformia
- Family: Staphylinidae
- Genus: Zyras
- Species: Z. collaris

Binomial name
- Zyras collaris (Paykull, 1789)

Synonyms
- Staphylinus collaris Paykull, 1789; Myrmedonia collaris (Paykull, 1789)

= Zyras collaris =

Species of beetle

Zyras collaris is a species of aleocharinae rove beetle in the family Staphylinidae. The species is widespread in Europe, extending into parts of West Asia (Turkey, Georgia, Azerbaijan, Iran) and North Africa (Algeria).
