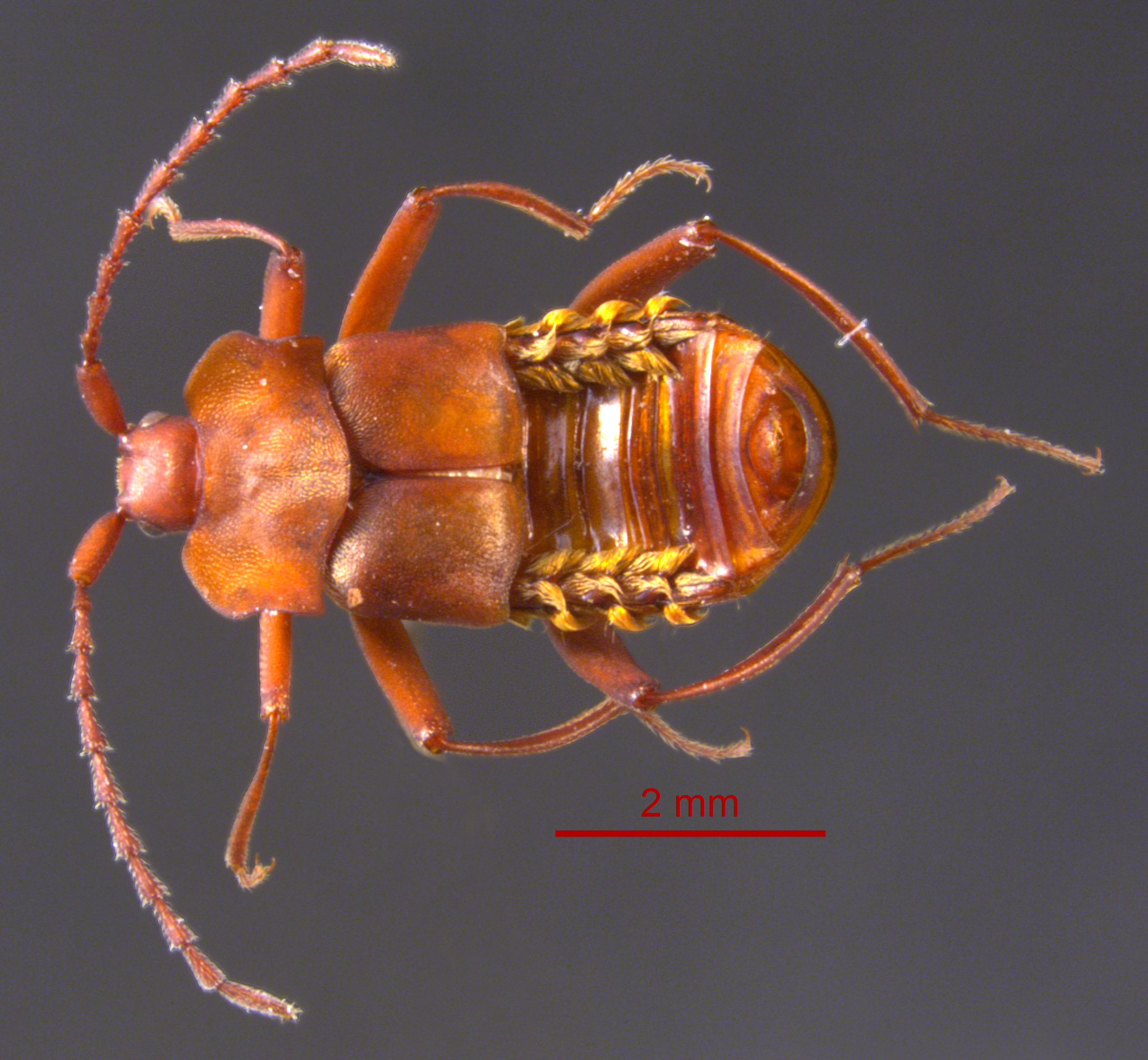

Scientific classification
- Kingdom: Animalia
- Phylum: Arthropoda
- Class: Insecta
- Order: Coleoptera
- Suborder: Polyphaga
- Infraorder: Staphyliniformia
- Family: Staphylinidae
- Genus: Xenodusa
- Species: X. cava

Binomial name
- Xenodusa cava (LeConte, 1863)

= Xenodusa cava =

Species of beetle

Xenodusa cava is a species of rove beetle in the family Staphylinidae. It is found in North America in both the United States and Canada. It is myrmecophilic, with its larvae living in ant colonies, begging for food and consuming ant larvae.
