= Labidoculex wazowski =

Scientific classification
- Kingdom: Animalia
- Phylum: Arthropoda
- Clade: Pancrustacea
- Class: Insecta
- Order: Coleoptera
- Suborder: Polyphaga
- Infraorder: Staphyliniformia
- Family: Staphylinidae
- Genus: Labidoculex
- Species: L. wazowski

Binomial name
- Labidoculex wazowski Montanhini, Zilberman & Moreno, 2025

Species of beetle

Labidoculex wazowski is a species of beetle of the family Staphylinidae. It is found in Brazil (São Paulo).

== Description ==
Adults reach a length of about 3.3 mm (0.13 in). The head is deep dark brown, while the body is brown. The elytra and tergites are feebly shiny, and the pronotum, elytra, legs, abdomen and antennae are paler. Antennomere 11 is flattened into a diagonal line, culminating in a membranous protuberance at the apical region. The eyes are very large, highly visible from dorsal view, and occupying most of the lateral head space. The pronotum strongly narrows at the anterior region, culminating into a visible neck.

== Life history ==
They are thought to be myrmecophilous guests of a Labidus species.

== Etymology ==
The species name refers to the fictional character Mike Wazowski from the movie Monsters, INC. The allusion is to the Wazowski’s big eye.
