= Claviger araxidis =

Scientific classification
- Kingdom: Animalia
- Phylum: Arthropoda
- Clade: Pancrustacea
- Class: Insecta
- Order: Coleoptera
- Suborder: Polyphaga
- Infraorder: Staphyliniformia
- Family: Staphylinidae
- Genus: Claviger
- Subgenus: Clavifer
- Species: C. araxidis

Binomial name
- Claviger araxidis (Reitter, 1890)

Species of beetle

Claviger araxidis is a species of beetle, from the subfamily Pselaphinae of the rove beetles. It belongs to the Clavifer subgenus of the Claviger genus. It was first described by Edmund Reitter in 1890. The species is present in Armenia.
