= Pella recisa =

Scientific classification
- Kingdom: Animalia
- Phylum: Arthropoda
- Class: Insecta
- Order: Coleoptera
- Suborder: Polyphaga
- Infraorder: Staphyliniformia
- Family: Staphylinidae
- Genus: Pella
- Species: P. recisa

Binomial name
- Pella recisa (Casey, 1911)

Species of beetle

Pella recisa is a species of rove beetle in the genus Pella. It was described by Casey in 1911.
