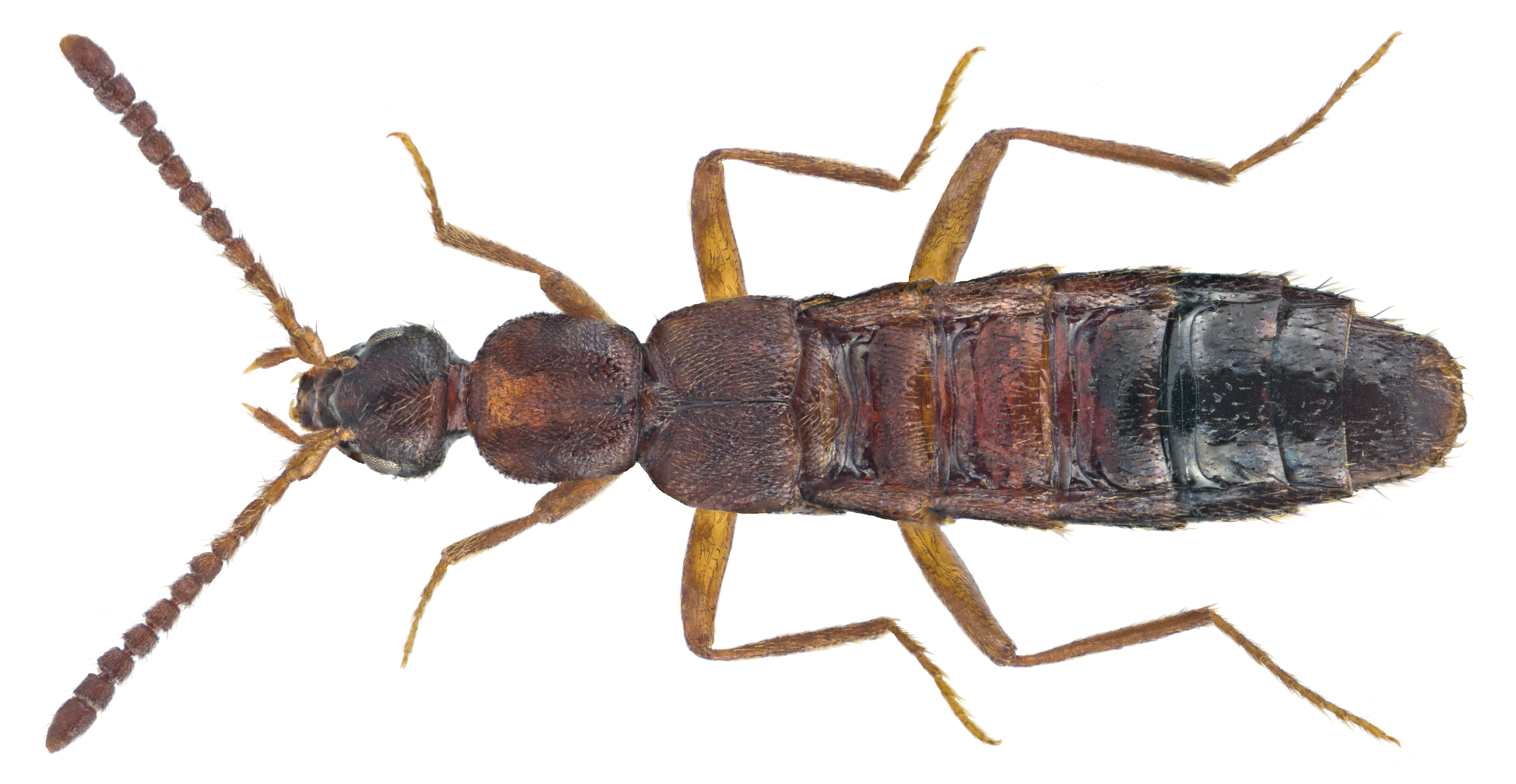
- Drusilla canaliculata

Scientific classification
- Kingdom: Animalia
- Phylum: Arthropoda
- Class: Insecta
- Order: Coleoptera
- Suborder: Polyphaga
- Infraorder: Staphyliniformia
- Family: Staphylinidae
- Subfamily: Aleocharinae
- Tribe: Lomechusini
- Subtribe: Myrmedoniina
- Genus: Drusilla; Leach, 1819

Subgenera
- Apteranopsis Jeannel, 1960; Drusilla; Tropignorimus Bernhauer, 1915

Synonyms
- Camacopalpus Motschulsky, 1858; Camacopselaphus Gemminger & Harold, 1868; Thoracophagus Kistner, 2003

= Drusilla (beetle) =

Genus of beetles

Drusilla is a genus of rove beetles in the family Staphylinidae. There are more than 220 described species in Drusilla.

== Species ==
These 227 species belong to the genus Drusilla:

- Drusilla adjacens (Cameron, 1939)
- Drusilla aeneicollis (Fauvel, 1899)
- Drusilla aequatorialis (Bernhauer, 1927)
- Drusilla aerea (Scheerpeltz, 1934)
- Drusilla affinis (Cameron, 1939)
- Drusilla aino Nakane, 1963
- Drusilla alutacea Reitter, 1901
- Drusilla anceps Assing, 2005
- Drusilla andrewesi (Cameron, 1939)
- Drusilla angularis (Fauvel, 1899)
- Drusilla anlasi Örgel, 2020
- Drusilla ashei Eldredge, 2012
- Drusilla assamensis (Cameron, 1939)
- Drusilla attenuata Kistner, 1997
- Drusilla baliensis Pace, 1987
- Drusilla bartolozzii (Pace, 2001)
- Drusilla bernhaueri (Scheerpeltz, 1934)
- Drusilla besucheti Assing, 2005
- Drusilla bicarinicollis Pace, 2008
- Drusilla bicolor (Cameron, 1950)
- Drusilla bifida Assing, 2016
- Drusilla bilobata Pace, 2014
- Drusilla bispinosa Assing, 2019
- Drusilla bituberculata (Motschulsky, 1858)
- Drusilla borneensis (Bernhauer, 1915)
- Drusilla borneoapicalis Pace, 2014
- Drusilla borneoclara Pace, 2014
- Drusilla borneoruficollis Pace, 2014
- Drusilla borneostricta Pace, 2014
- Drusilla brevipennis (Cameron, 1939)
- Drusilla breviuter Assing, 2019
- Drusilla bruneiensis Pace, 2008
- Drusilla bruneiorum Pace, 2008
- Drusilla bryanti (Cameron, 1950)
- Drusilla bucina Assing, 2019
- Drusilla bulbata Assing, 2008
- Drusilla bulbosa Pace, 2014
- Drusilla burgeoniana (Bernhauer, 1943)
- Drusilla butuanensis (Bernhauer, 1916)
- Drusilla caelata Pace, 1987
- Drusilla caelaticollis Pace, 2008
- Drusilla calicis Pace, 2012
- Drusilla cameroni (Scheerpeltz, 1934)
- Drusilla canaliculata (Fabricius, 1787)
- Drusilla caputserpentis Pace, 2014
- Drusilla carinithorax (Bernhauer, 1915)
- Drusilla celebensis (Cameron, 1942)
- Drusilla cenwanglaomontis Pace, 2012
- Drusilla cernens Assing, 2005
- Drusilla congoensis (Kistner, 2003)
- Drusilla convexifrons (Fairmaire, 1873)
- Drusilla cretica Assing, 2005
- Drusilla cupulifer (Fauvel, 1906)
- Drusilla damingensis Pace, 2012
- Drusilla danumensis Pace, 2014
- Drusilla dendrolasii Maruyama & Kishimoto, 2002
- Drusilla denigrata Assing, 2005
- Drusilla denticollis (Bernhauer, 1933)
- Drusilla dharmapuriensis Pace, 2001
- Drusilla dimidiata Pace, 1987
- Drusilla divergens Pace, 2014
- Drusilla dorylophila (Bernhauer, 1929)
- Drusilla drescheri (Cameron, 1939)
- Drusilla dumogaicola Pace, 2004
- Drusilla dusunorum Pace, 1993
- Drusilla endopilosella Pace, 2000
- Drusilla endorica (Saulcy, 1865)
- Drusilla erichsoni (Peyron, 1857)
- Drusilla feae (Cameron, 1939)
- Drusilla fissata (Bernhauer, 1915)
- Drusilla flagellata Assing, 2015
- Drusilla flava (Cameron, 1939)
- Drusilla flavicornis (Motschulsky, 1858)
- Drusilla foeda Pace, 2008
- Drusilla fontis Pace, 2008
- Drusilla foreli (Wasmann, 1890)
- Drusilla fossulicollis Pace, 2008
- Drusilla fossulifera Pace, 1987
- Drusilla frater (Cameron, 1950)
- Drusilla gabonensis Pace, 2012
- Drusilla ganglbaueri (Bernhauer, 1906)
- Drusilla gibberella Pace, 1998
- Drusilla gilva Pace, 2012
- Drusilla gracilicornis (Bernhauer, 1902)
- Drusilla gracilis (Hochhuth, 1849)
- Drusilla granulata (Bernhauer, 1927)
- Drusilla granulicollis (Cameron, 1939)
- Drusilla guineensis (Bernhauer, 1932)
- Drusilla haematica (Fauvel, 1899)
- Drusilla heydeni (Eppelsheim, 1887)
- Drusilla hipponensis (Fauvel, 1898)
- Drusilla holoserica Assing, 2019
- Drusilla impressicollis (Kraatz, 1857)
- Drusilla imurai Maruyama & Kishimoto, 2002
- Drusilla incola (Fauvel, 1904)
- Drusilla inflatae Maruyama, Sze Hue Yek, Hashim & F. Ito, 2003
- Drusilla iniqua Assing, 2021
- Drusilla intermedia (Cameron, 1933)
- Drusilla italica (Bernhauer, 1903)
- Drusilla jacobsoni (Cameron, 1936)
- Drusilla javana (Cameron, 1939)
- Drusilla kabyliana (Fagel, 1958)
- Drusilla kadooriorum Pace, 1998
- Drusilla kamerunensis (Bernhauer, 1912)
- Drusilla kathmanduensis Pace, 1992
- Drusilla katiki Pace, 1993
- Drusilla keiichii Maruyama, 2004
- Drusilla khamhengi Pace, 1986
- Drusilla kinabaluensis Pace, 1987
- Drusilla kisumuensis Pace, 1996
- Drusilla laevicauda (Bernhauer, 1903)
- Drusilla lateremaculata Pace, 2016
- Drusilla lativentris Assing, 2017
- Drusilla lethierryi (Fauvel, 1898)
- Drusilla liangicola Pace, 1993
- Drusilla limata Assing, 2005
- Drusilla lineatocollis (Kraatz, 1859)
- Drusilla longatheca Pace, 2004
- Drusilla longispinosa Assing, 2021
- Drusilla lucens (Cameron, 1950)
- Drusilla lucida (Cameron, 1950)
- Drusilla luzonica (Bernhauer, 1915)
- Drusilla lydica Assing, 2007
- Drusilla magniceps (Cameron, 1939)
- Drusilla mahnerti Pace, 1996
- Drusilla malaisei (Scheerpeltz, 1965)
- Drusilla malindensis Pace, 1991
- Drusilla manenekarum Pace, 1993
- Drusilla manubrifera Pace, 2010
- Drusilla memnonia (Märkel, 1844)
- Drusilla meridiana (Fauvel, 1900)
- Drusilla mixta (Cameron, 1939)
- Drusilla montanella (Bernhauer, 1936)
- Drusilla monticola (Cameron, 1943)
- Drusilla nearctica Eldredge, 2012
- Drusilla necaerea Pace, 2008
- Drusilla nepalensis Pace, 1992
- Drusilla nigra Cameron, 1925
- Drusilla nigrescens (Motschulsky, 1858)
- Drusilla nilgiriensis (Pace, 2001)
- Drusilla nomurai Maruyama, 2000
- Drusilla obliqua (Bernhauer, 1916)
- Drusilla obliquoides Pace, 2003
- Drusilla occipitalis Pace, 1987
- Drusilla ocularis Fenyes, 1914
- Drusilla opacipennis (Bernhauer, 1902)
- Drusilla operosa Pace, 1987
- Drusilla orientalis (Cameron, 1939)
- Drusilla orissaensis Pace, 2011
- Drusilla palata Assing, 2015
- Drusilla pallidicornis Assing, 2005
- Drusilla papuana (Cameron, 1937)
- Drusilla pendleburyi (Cameron, 1950)
- Drusilla penicillata Assing, 2019
- Drusilla perakensis Pace, 2013
- Drusilla perdensa Pace, 2004
- Drusilla perforans Assing, 2015
- Drusilla persica Assing, 2005
- Drusilla persulcata Pace, 2004
- Drusilla pervisa Pace, 1987
- Drusilla philippina (Bernhauer, 1915)
- Drusilla planaticollis (Kraatz, 1857)
- Drusilla plena Pace, 2004
- Drusilla plicipennis (Bernhauer, 1915)
- Drusilla profunda Pace, 2014
- Drusilla proxima (Cameron, 1939)
- Drusilla pudukkottaiensis Pace, 2001
- Drusilla puetzi Assing, 2011
- Drusilla punctatissima (Kraatz, 1857)
- Drusilla raffrayi (Fairmaire, 1871)
- Drusilla rantepaoicola Pace, 1993
- Drusilla recta Assing, 2005
- Drusilla refugita Pace, 2000
- Drusilla rougemonti Pace, 1987
- Drusilla rougemontiana Pace, 2014
- Drusilla ruficornis (Cameron, 1939)
- Drusilla rufiventris (Cameron, 1950)
- Drusilla rufobrunnea (Cameron, 1939)
- Drusilla rufocaelata Pace, 2008
- Drusilla rufoflava (Cameron, 1950)
- Drusilla sabahensis Pace, 2014
- Drusilla sabahorum Pace, 2014
- Drusilla samalica Assing, 2021
- Drusilla schawalleri Kistner, 1994
- Drusilla sculpticollides Hlaváč, Newton & Maruyama, 2011
- Drusilla semicircularis (Bernhauer, 1929)
- Drusilla semicyanea (Cameron, 1930)
- Drusilla semimonticola Pace, 2008
- Drusilla semiobliqua Pace, 2005
- Drusilla semipunctata (Bernhauer, 1929)
- Drusilla semirubra Cameron, 1950
- Drusilla serrulae Pace, 2014
- Drusilla shavrini Assing, 2019
- Drusilla singalorum Pace, 1988
- Drusilla sinicola Pace, 2012
- Drusilla sinuosa Assing, 2005
- Drusilla smetanai Pace, 1992
- Drusilla sparsa (Sharp, 1874)
- Drusilla spiniventris Assing, 2019
- Drusilla spissatheca Pace, 2008
- Drusilla stevensi (Cameron, 1939)
- Drusilla strigicollis (Cameron, 1928)
- Drusilla subsplendens Assing, 2011
- Drusilla suturalis (Erichson, 1843)
- Drusilla takashii Maruyama, 2004
- Drusilla taygetana Assing, 2005
- Drusilla terrestris Pace, 2008
- Drusilla thai Pace, 2012
- Drusilla theryi (Fauvel, 1898)
- Drusilla tigrata Pace, 1992
- Drusilla todolarum Pace, 1993
- Drusilla trigonocephala (Cameron, 1939)
- Drusilla trina Pace, 2014
- Drusilla trituberculata Assing, 2021
- Drusilla tronqueti Pace, 1988
- Drusilla tuberculata (Bernhauer, 1916)
- Drusilla ulusegamicola Pace, 2015
- Drusilla umranicola Pace, 2005
- Drusilla umtaliensis Pace, 1996
- Drusilla unicolor (Cameron, 1950)
- Drusilla veluticollis (Cameron, 1928)
- Drusilla villosa (Peyerimhoff, 1909)
- Drusilla wallacei (Kistner & McNairn, 1991)
- Drusilla watanabei Maruyama & Kishimoto, 2002
- Drusilla yunnanensis Pace, 1993
- Drusilla zhejiangensis Pace, 1998
- Drusilla zimbabwensis Pace, 1996
