= Tetradonia megalops =

Scientific classification
- Kingdom: Animalia
- Phylum: Arthropoda
- Class: Insecta
- Order: Coleoptera
- Suborder: Polyphaga
- Infraorder: Staphyliniformia
- Family: Staphylinidae
- Genus: Tetradonia
- Species: T. megalops

Binomial name
- Tetradonia megalops (Casey, 1906)

Species of beetle

Tetradonia megalops is a species of rove beetle in the family Staphylinidae.
