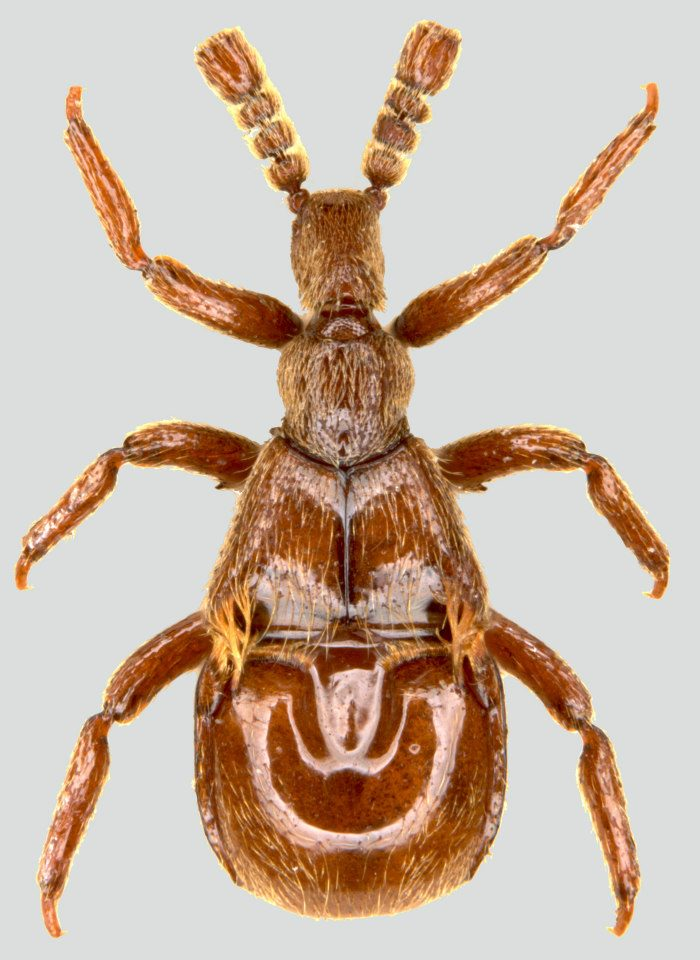
- Claviger testaceus

Scientific classification
- Kingdom: Animalia
- Phylum: Arthropoda
- Class: Insecta
- Order: Coleoptera
- Suborder: Polyphaga
- Infraorder: Staphyliniformia
- Family: Staphylinidae
- Subfamily: Pselaphinae
- Genus: Claviger

= Claviger (beetle) =

Genus of beetles

Claviger is a genus of beetles in the family Staphylinidae, subfamily Pselaphinae. About 40 species and subspecies are described, divided into two subgenera, Claviger (Claviger) and Claviger (Clavifer). Claviger displays unusual biological adaptations to myrmecophily. This pselaphid is of Palearctic distribution.

== Species ==
Species list:

- Claviger (Clavifer) apenninus Baudi di Selve, 1869
- Claviger araxidis Reitter, 1890
- Claviger barbarus Bedel, 1884
- Claviger bartoni Mařan, 1936
- Claviger caspicus Reitter, 1882
- Claviger ciscaucasicus Reitter, 1910
- Claviger colchicus Motschulsky, 1837
- Claviger duvali Saulcy, 1863
- Claviger (Clavifer) elysius Reitter, 1884
- Claviger emgei Reitter, 1885
- Claviger guilloti Peyerimhoff, 1915
- Claviger (Clavifer) handmanni Wasmann, 1898
- Claviger ibericus Motschulsky, 1844
- Claviger intermedius Besuchet, 1961
- Claviger justinae Reitter, 1887
- Claviger katharinae Escherich, 1897
- Claviger lederi Reitter, 1877
- Claviger (Clavifer) longicornis P.W.J. Müller, 1818
- Claviger (Clavifer) merkli Reitter, 1885
- Claviger montandoni Raffray, 1905
- Claviger nebrodensis Ragusa, 1871
- Claviger nitidus Hampe, 1863
- Claviger oertzeni Reitter, 1885
- Claviger olympicus Escherich, 1897
- Claviger ottomanus Escherich, 1897
- Claviger piochardi Saulcy, 1874
  - Claviger piochardi brucki Saulcy 1874
  - Claviger piochardi piochardi Saulcy, 1874
- Claviger pouzaui Saulcy, 1862
  - Claviger pouzaui cobosi Mateu, 1954
  - Claviger pouzaui pouzaui Saulcy, 1862
  - Claviger pouzaui validus Besuchet, 1961
- Claviger pyrenaeus Raffray, 1887
- Claviger raffrayi Reitter, 1893
- Claviger (Clavifer) revelierei Saulcy, 1874
- Claviger saulcyi Brissout de Barneville, 1866
  - Claviger saulcyi espanoli Mateu, 1954
  - Claviger saulcyi lucens Besuchet, 1961
  - Claviger saulcyi saulcyi Brissout de Barneville, 1866
- Claviger (Claviger) testaceus Preyssler, 1790
  - Claviger testaceus persicus B. Bodemeyer, 1927
  - Claviger testaceus testaceus Preyssler, 1790
  - Claviger testaceus perezii Reitter, 1881

== See also ==
- Lasius claviger, a variety of ant
