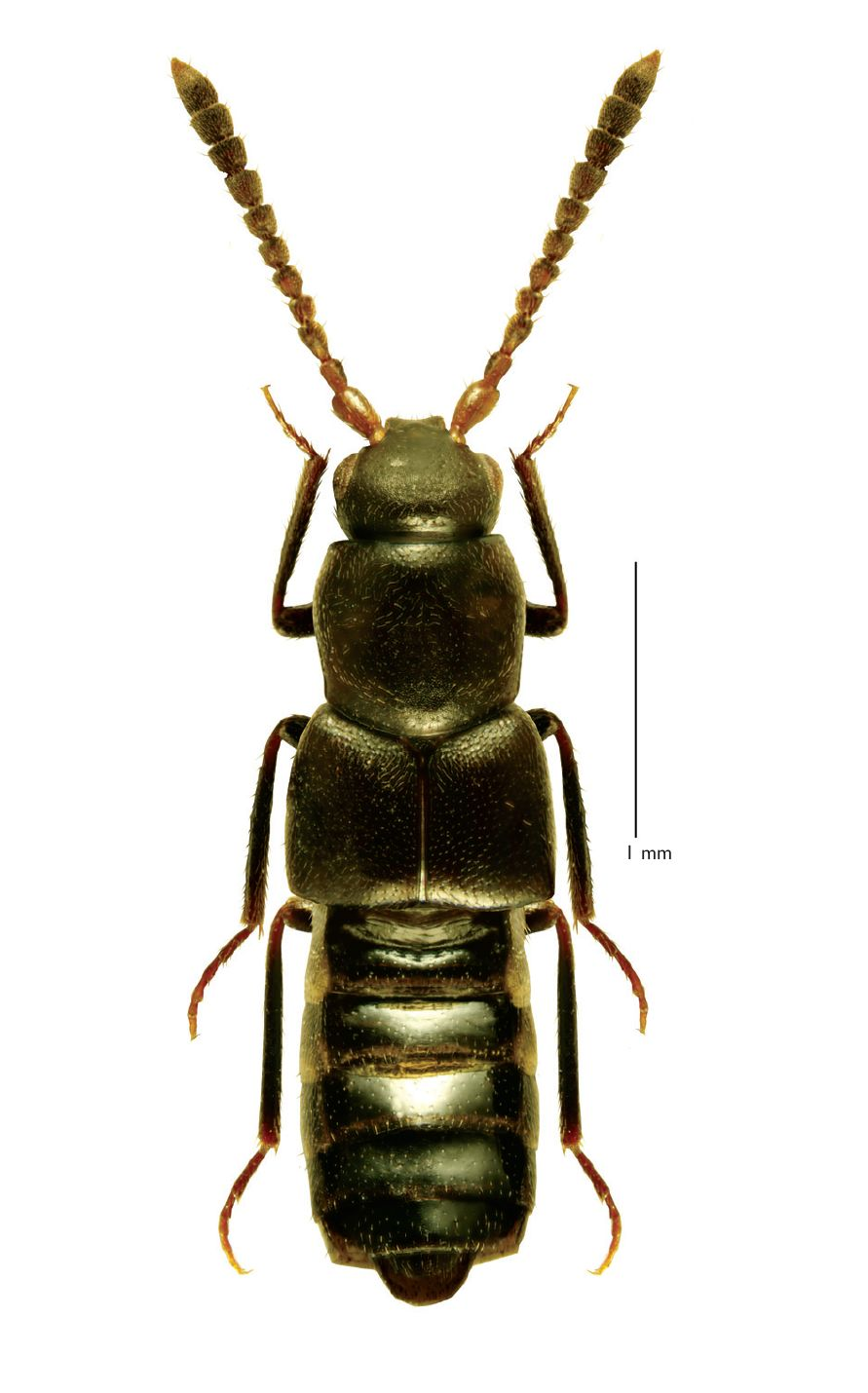

Scientific classification
- Kingdom: Animalia
- Phylum: Arthropoda
- Clade: Pancrustacea
- Class: Insecta
- Order: Coleoptera
- Suborder: Polyphaga
- Infraorder: Staphyliniformia
- Family: Staphylinidae
- Subtribe: Myrmedoniina
- Genus: Pella; Stephens, 1835

= Pella (beetle) =

Genus of beetles

Pella is a genus of rove beetles.

== Species ==
- Pella angustula (Casey, 1893)
- Pella caliginosa (Casey, 1893)
- Pella carolina (Casey, 1911)
- Pella criddlei (Casey, 1911)
- Pella fauveli (Sharp, 1883)
- Pella gesneri Klimaszewski in Klimaszewski, Sweeney, Price & Pelletier, 2005
- Pella loricata (Casey, 1893)
- Pella maoershanensis Song & Li, 2013
- Pella recisa (Casey, 1911)
- Pella schmitti (Hamilton, 1895)
