= Xesturida =

Scientific classification
- Kingdom: Animalia
- Phylum: Arthropoda
- Class: Insecta
- Order: Coleoptera
- Suborder: Polyphaga
- Infraorder: Staphyliniformia
- Family: Staphylinidae
- Tribe: Lomechusini
- Genus: Xesturida; Casey, 1906

Genus of beetles

Xesturida is a genus of rove beetles in the family Staphylinidae. There is at least one described species in Xesturida, X. laevis.
