= Platyusa =

Scientific classification
- Kingdom: Animalia
- Phylum: Arthropoda
- Clade: Pancrustacea
- Class: Insecta
- Order: Coleoptera
- Suborder: Polyphaga
- Infraorder: Staphyliniformia
- Family: Staphylinidae
- Subtribe: Myrmedoniina
- Genus: Platyusa; Casey, 1885
- Species: P. sonomae

Binomial name
- Platyusa sonomae Casey, 1885

Genus of beetles

Platyusa is a monotypic genus of rove beetles in the family Staphylinidae. There is one described species in Platyusa, P. sonomae, found in the western United States.
