= Ecitoxenidia =

Scientific classification
- Kingdom: Animalia
- Phylum: Arthropoda
- Class: Insecta
- Order: Coleoptera
- Suborder: Polyphaga
- Infraorder: Staphyliniformia
- Family: Staphylinidae
- Tribe: Lomechusini
- Genus: Ecitoxenidia; Wasmann, 1909

Genus of beetles

Ecitoxenidia is a genus of rove beetles in the family Staphylinidae. There are about five described species in Ecitoxenidia.

== Species ==
These five species belong to the genus Ecitoxenidia:

- Ecitoxenidia alabamae Seevers, 1959^{i c g b}
- Ecitoxenidia ashei Kistner in Kistner, Ashe and Jacobson, 1996^{i c g}
- Ecitoxenidia brevicornis Seevers, 1959^{i c g}
- Ecitoxenidia brevipes (Brues, 1902)^{i c g}
- Ecitoxenidia longicornis (Borgmeier, 1949)^{i c g}

Data sources: i = ITIS, c = Catalogue of Life, g = GBIF, b = Bugguide.net
