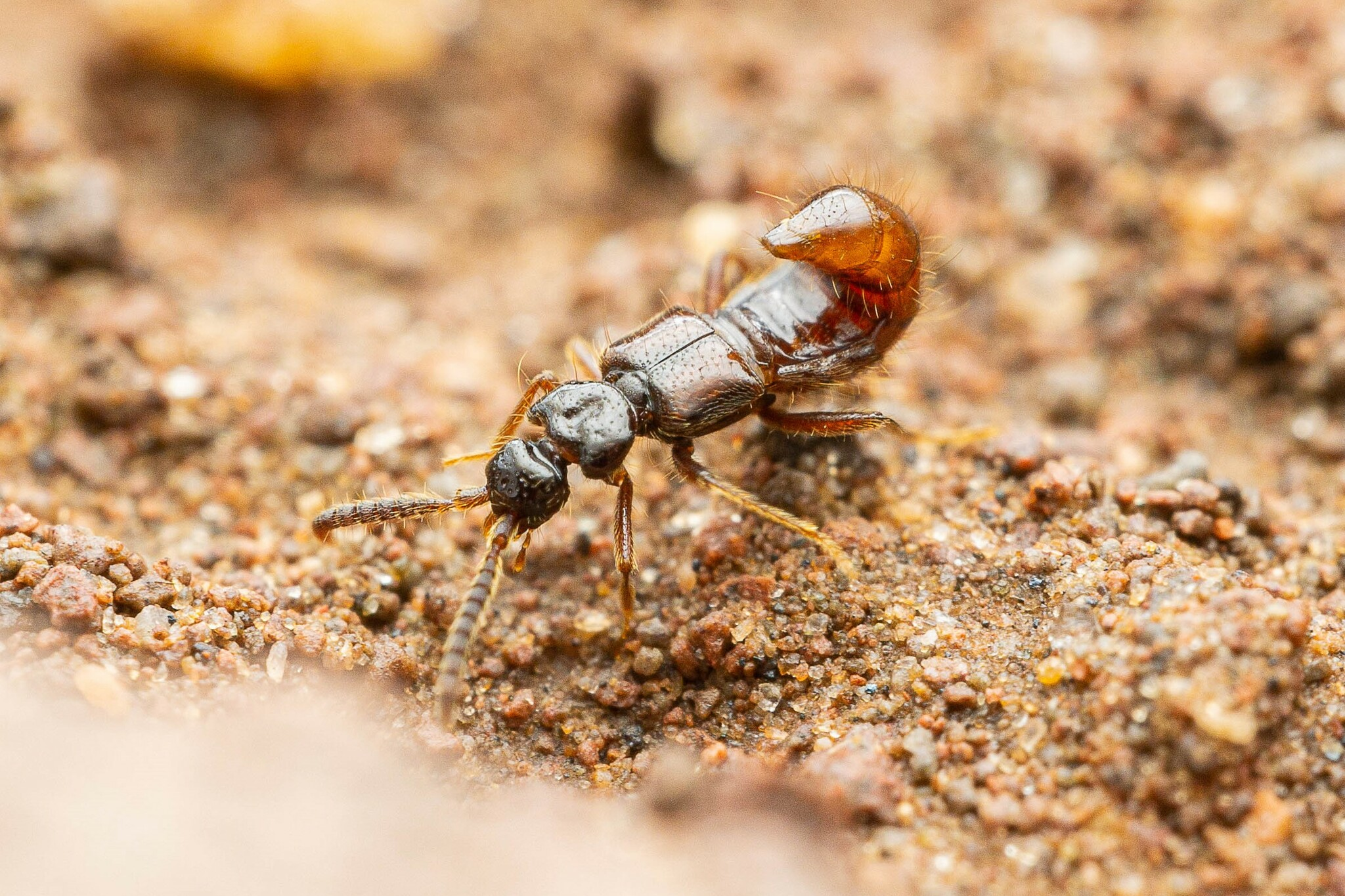
- In Arizona, US

Scientific classification
- Kingdom: Animalia
- Phylum: Arthropoda
- Class: Insecta
- Order: Coleoptera
- Suborder: Polyphaga
- Infraorder: Staphyliniformia
- Family: Staphylinidae
- Subfamily: Aleocharinae
- Tribe: Lomechusini
- Genus: Dinocoryna; Casey, 1893

Synonyms
- Ecitonusa Wasmann, 1897

= Dinocoryna =

Genus of beetles

Dinocoryna is a genus of rove beetles in the family Staphylinidae. There are at least 6 described species in the genus Dinocoryna.

== Species ==
These six species belong to the genus Dinocoryna:

- Dinocoryna akrei Seevers, 1965
- Dinocoryna arizonensis Seevers, 1959
- Dinocoryna bisinuata Casey, 1893
- Dinocoryna carolinensis Seevers, 1959
- Dinocoryna schmitti (Wasmann, 1897)
- Dinocoryna tibialis Seevers, 1959
