= Labidoculex =

Scientific classification
- Kingdom: Animalia
- Phylum: Arthropoda
- Clade: Pancrustacea
- Class: Insecta
- Order: Coleoptera
- Suborder: Polyphaga
- Infraorder: Staphyliniformia
- Family: Staphylinidae
- Subfamily: Aleocharinae
- Tribe: Lomechusini
- Genus: Labidoculex; Reichensperger, 1936

Genus of beetles

Labidoculex is a genus of beetles belonging to the family Staphylinidae.

== Species ==
- Labidoculex antennalis Seevers, 1965
- Labidoculex fragilis Reichensperger, 1936
- Labidoculex validus Borgmeier, 1958
- Labidoculex wazowski Montanhini, Zilberman & Moreno, 2025
