= Adranes =

Scientific classification
- Kingdom: Animalia
- Phylum: Arthropoda
- Class: Insecta
- Order: Coleoptera
- Suborder: Polyphaga
- Infraorder: Staphyliniformia
- Family: Staphylinidae
- Supertribe: Clavigeritae
- Tribe: Clavigerini
- Subtribe: Clavigerina
- Genus: Adranes; LeConte, 1849

Genus of beetles

Adranes is a genus of ant-loving beetles in the family Staphylinidae. There are about six described species in Adranes.

== Species ==
These six species belong to the genus Adranes:

- Adranes angustus Casey, 1924
- Adranes coecus LeConte, 1849
- Adranes dietzi Schaeffer, 1906
- Adranes lecontei Brendel, 1865
- Adranes pacificus Wickham, 1901
- Adranes taylori Wickham, 1901
