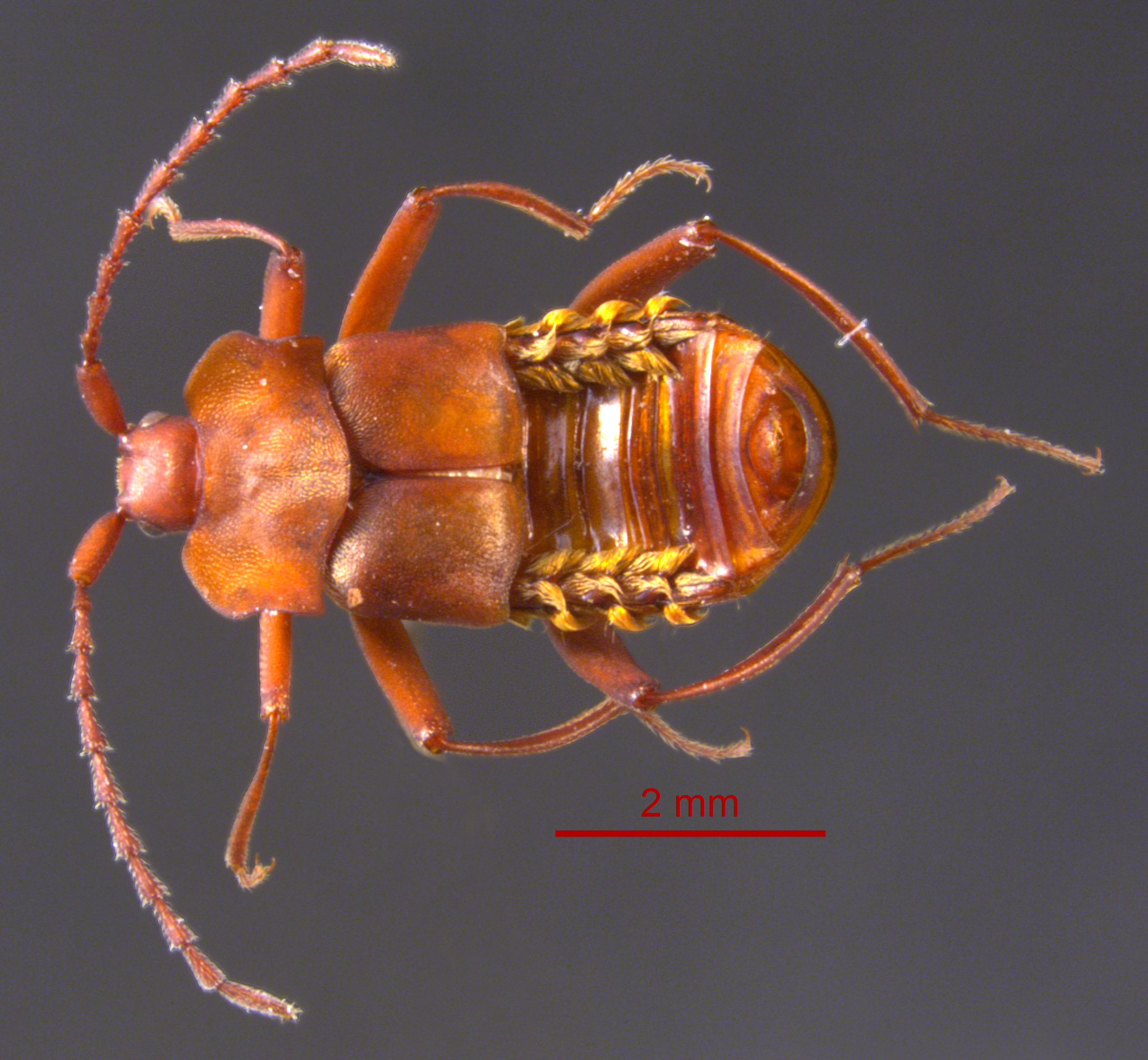
- Xenodusa cava

Scientific classification
- Kingdom: Animalia
- Phylum: Arthropoda
- Class: Insecta
- Order: Coleoptera
- Suborder: Polyphaga
- Infraorder: Staphyliniformia
- Family: Staphylinidae
- Tribe: Lomechusini
- Genus: Xenodusa; Wasmann, 1894

= Xenodusa =

Genus of beetles

Xenodusa is a genus of rove beetles in the family Staphylinidae. There are about five to six recognized species in Xenodusa.

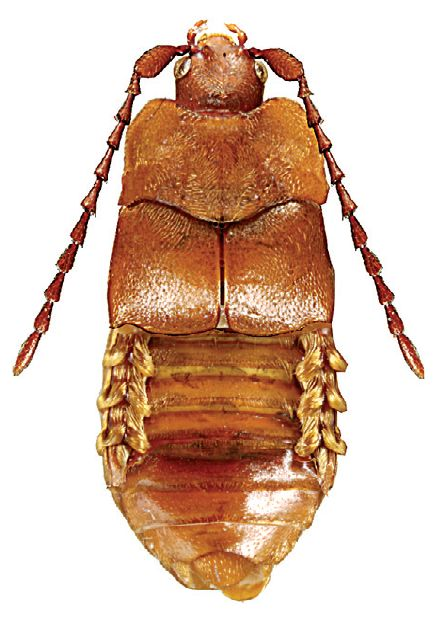
Xenodusa reflexa

== Species ==
There are five to six recognized Xenodusa species:

- Xenodusa angusta (Fall, 1901)^{i c g}
- Xenodusa australis Montrouzier, 1860^{c g}
- Xenodusa caseyi Wasmann, 1897^{i c g}
- Xenodusa cava (LeConte, 1863)^{i c g}
- Xenodusa reflexa (Walker, 1866)^{i c g}
- Xenodusa sharpi Wasmann, 1896^{i c g}

Data sources: i = ITIS, c = Catalogue of Life, g = GBIF,
