= Myrmoecia =

Scientific classification
- Kingdom: Animalia
- Phylum: Arthropoda
- Clade: Pancrustacea
- Class: Insecta
- Order: Coleoptera
- Suborder: Polyphaga
- Infraorder: Staphyliniformia
- Family: Staphylinidae
- Tribe: Lomechusini
- Genus: Myrmoecia; Mulsant & Rey, 1874

Genus of beetles

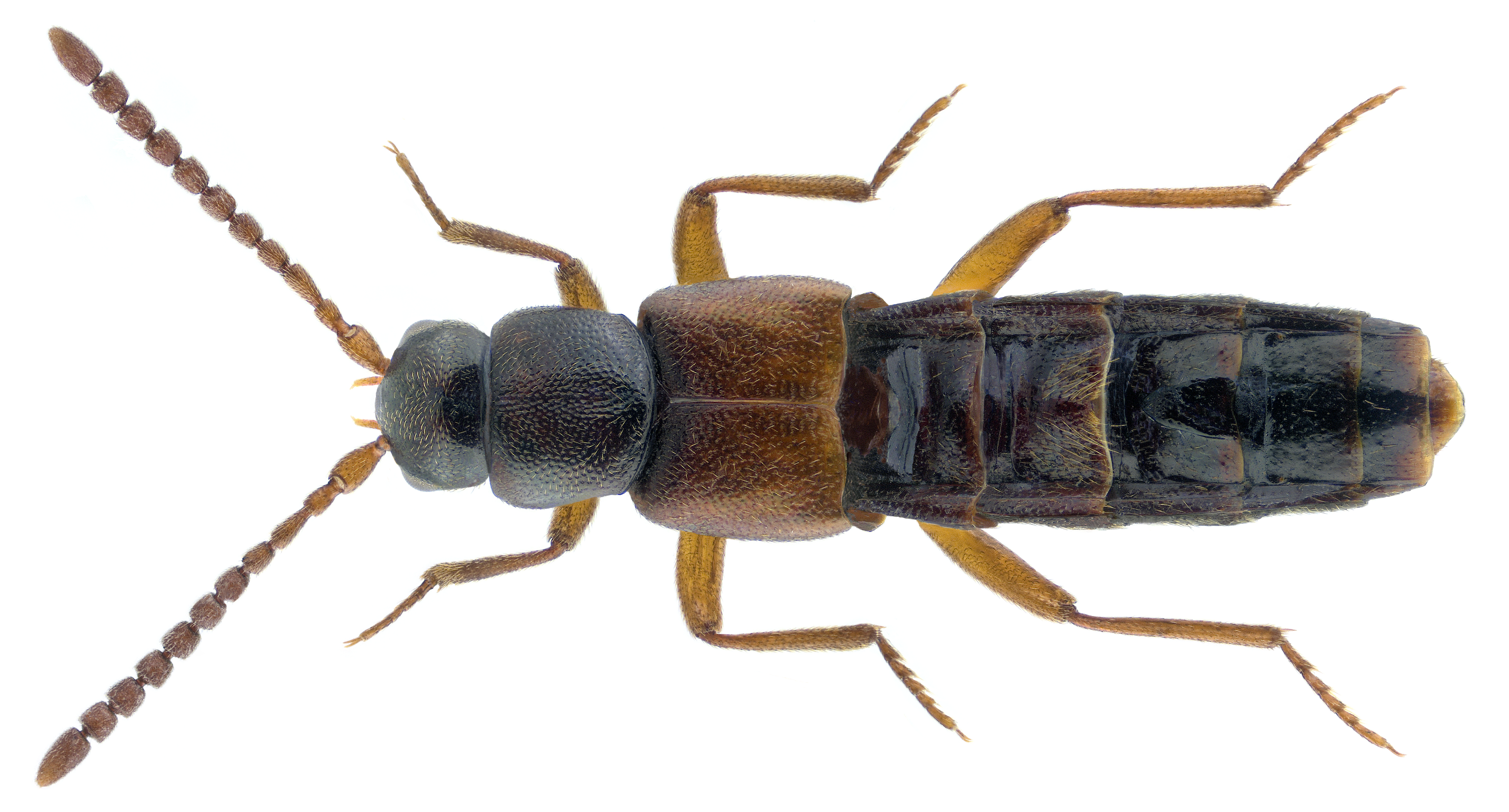
Myrmoecia plicata (Erichson, 1837), Staphylinidae, 5.2 mm, Germany: Thuringia/Hessen, Neumorschen, Halberg, 210 m, Collected by Cloos (13 July 1999), ID by W. Apfel (2001), Photo by U. Schmidt (2019)

Myrmoecia is a genus of rove beetles in the family Staphylinidae. There are about nine described species in Myrmoecia.

== Species ==
These nine species belong to the genus Myrmoecia:

- Myrmoecia canadensis Maruyama & Klimaszewski, 2006^{g}
- Myrmoecia confragosa (Hochhuth, 1849)^{g}
- Myrmoecia lauta (Casey, 1893)^{i c g b}
- Myrmoecia lugubris (Casey, 1893)^{i c g}
- Myrmoecia physogaster (Fairmaire, 1860)^{g}
- Myrmoecia plicata (Erichson, 1837)^{g}
- Myrmoecia rigida (Erichson, 1839)^{g}
- Myrmoecia triangulum (Pérez-Arcas, 1874)^{g}
- Myrmoecia tuberiventris (Fairmaire, 1855)^{g}

Data sources: i = ITIS, c = Catalogue of Life, g = GBIF, b = Bugguide.net
