= Microdonia =

Scientific classification
- Kingdom: Animalia
- Phylum: Arthropoda
- Class: Insecta
- Order: Coleoptera
- Suborder: Polyphaga
- Infraorder: Staphyliniformia
- Family: Staphylinidae
- Tribe: Lomechusini
- Genus: Microdonia; Casey, 1893

Genus of beetles

Microdonia is a genus of rove beetles in the family Staphylinidae. There are at least four described species in Microdonia.

== Species ==
These four species belong to the genus Microdonia:

- Microdonia kansana Seevers, 1959^{i c g}
- Microdonia laticollis (Brues, 1902)^{i c g}
- Microdonia nitidiventris (Brues, 1904)^{i c g b}
- Microdonia occipitalis Casey, 1893^{i c g}

Data sources: i = ITIS, c = Catalogue of Life, g = GBIF, b = Bugguide.net
