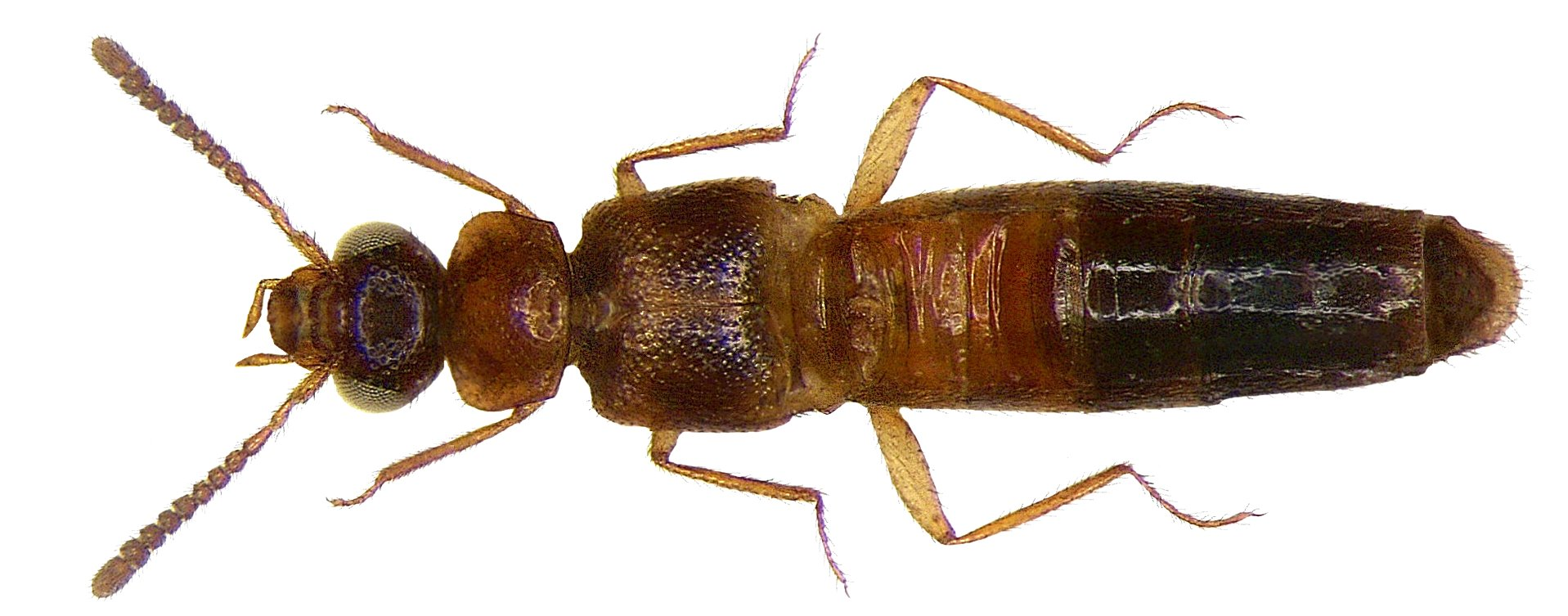
- Zyras tsavicola

Scientific classification
- Kingdom: Animalia
- Phylum: Arthropoda
- Clade: Pancrustacea
- Class: Insecta
- Order: Coleoptera
- Suborder: Polyphaga
- Infraorder: Staphyliniformia
- Family: Staphylinidae
- Tribe: Lomechusini
- Genus: Zyras; Stephens, 1835

= Zyras =

Genus of beetles

Zyras is a genus of beetles in the family Staphylinidae.

== Species ==
These 113 species belong to the genus Zyras:

- Zyras abacus Dvorak, 1984
- Zyras adulescens (Pace, 1987)
- Zyras alboantennatus Pace, 1986
- Zyras alboterminalis Pace, 2008
- Zyras alternans (Cameron, 1925)
- Zyras angkoricola Pace, 2004
- Zyras bartolozzii Pace, 2003
- Zyras basilewskyi Last, 1956
- Zyras beijingensis Pace, 1993
- Zyras benenensis Pace, 2001
- Zyras birmanus Scheerpeltz, 1965
- Zyras biroi Last, 1980
- Zyras bonus Last, 1977
- Zyras bramtonus Last, 1962
- Zyras britannorum Pace, 1992
- Zyras bryanti Cameron, 1943
- Zyras castaneus (Motschulsky, 1861)
- Zyras championi Cameron, 1939
- Zyras chinkiangensis Bernhauer, 1939
- Zyras chumphonensis Pace, 2004
- Zyras collaris (Paykull, 1789)
- Zyras coloratus Cameron, 1939
- Zyras condignus Last, 1969
- Zyras conjectus Last, 1960
- Zyras cultus Last, 1960
- Zyras cylindricornis Dvorak, 1981
- Zyras daiaccorum Pace, 2008
- Zyras distinctus Bierig, 1937
- Zyras drescheri Cameron, 1939
- Zyras drugmandi Pace, 2004
- Zyras elegantulus Cameron, 1939
- Zyras exasperatus Schubert, 1908
- Zyras facundus Last, 1969
- Zyras ferrugineiventris Scheerpeltz, 1965
- Zyras ferrugineus Cameron, 1939
- Zyras fl avorufus Cameron, 1939
- Zyras fratrumkadooriorum Pace, 1998
- Zyras fugax (Sharp, 1888)
- Zyras fulgidus (Gravenhorst, 1806)
- Zyras fustigans Pace, 2000
- Zyras gardneri Cameron, 1939
- Zyras geminus (Kraatz, 1859)
- Zyras glabricollis Scheerpeltz, 1965
- Zyras gratellus Cameron, 1939
- Zyras hastatus Fauvel, 1904
- Zyras hauserianus Bernhauer, 1933
- Zyras haworthi (Stephens, 1832)
- Zyras hirsutiventris (Champion, 1927)
- Zyras hirsutus Cameron, 1943
- Zyras hirtus (Kraatz, 1859)
- Zyras hongkongensis Pace, 1999
- Zyras illecebrosus Last, 1982
- Zyras indicus Cameron, 1944
- Zyras iridescens (Sawada, 1970)
- Zyras kambaitiensis Scheerpeltz, 1965
- Zyras kinabaluensis Pace, 2008
- Zyras kraatzi Schubert, 1908
- Zyras louwerensi Cameron, 1939
- Zyras maculipennis Gridelli, 1921
- Zyras malaisei Scheerpeltz, 1965
- Zyras manjushri Pace, 1992
- Zyras matangensis Cameron, 1943
- Zyras montanus (Bernhauer, 1915)
- Zyras mortuorum Pace, 1990
- Zyras morvani Pace, 1986
- Zyras mutarensis Pace, 1996
- Zyras nakuruensis Pace, 1996
- Zyras nigerrimus Cameron, 1943
- Zyras nigritus Last, 1980
- Zyras nigroaeneus Cameron, 1939
- Zyras nilgiriensis Cameron, 1939
- Zyras nitens Cameron, 1944
- Zyras notaticornis Pace, 1998
- Zyras obliquus (Casey, 1893)^{i c g b}
- Zyras optatus (Sharp, 1888)
- Zyras optimus Cameron, 1939
- Zyras paecesanus Pace, 1997
- Zyras paederinus Pace, 2008
- Zyras pallipes Pace, 1992
- Zyras pallipyga Pace, 2008
- Zyras papuanus Pace, 2000
- Zyras parageminus Pace, 1988
- Zyras particornis (Sharp, 1888)
- Zyras perforatus (Champion, 1921)
- Zyras pervariolosus Pace, 2008
- Zyras pictus (Sharp, 1874)
- Zyras pindarae (Champion, 1921)
- Zyras planctos Last, 1977
- Zyras planifer (Casey, 1893)^{i c g}
- Zyras preangeranus Cameron, 1939
- Zyras proximus Cameron, 1939
- Zyras pseudobirmanus Scheerpeltz, 1965
- Zyras punctipennis Cameron, 1939
- Zyras punctus Last, 1967
- Zyras quadriterminalis Pace, 2008
- Zyras quasar Dvorak, 1996
- Zyras restitutus Pace, 1993
- Zyras rudis (LeConte, 1866)^{i c g b}
- Zyras rufescens Cameron, 1939
- Zyras rufi cauda Cameron, 1939
- Zyras semiasperatus Scheerpeltz, 1965
- Zyras seminigerrimus Bernhauer, 1933
- Zyras setosipennis Scheerpeltz, 1965
- Zyras setosivestis Scheerpeltz, 1965
- Zyras shaanxiensis Pace, 1998
- Zyras shiva Pace, 1987
- Zyras sibiricus Bernhauer, 1914
- Zyras song Pace, 1993
- Zyras songanus Pace, 1993
- Zyras tambachensis Pace, 1996
- Zyras thaiorum Pace, 1986
- Zyras variolatus Pace, 2003
- Zyras wei Pace, 1993

Data sources: i = ITIS, c = Catalogue of Life, g = GBIF, b = Bugguide.net
