= Lomechusoides =

Scientific classification
- Kingdom: Animalia
- Phylum: Arthropoda
- Clade: Pancrustacea
- Class: Insecta
- Order: Coleoptera
- Suborder: Polyphaga
- Infraorder: Staphyliniformia
- Family: Staphylinidae
- Genus: Lomechusoides; Tottenham, 1939

Genus of beetles

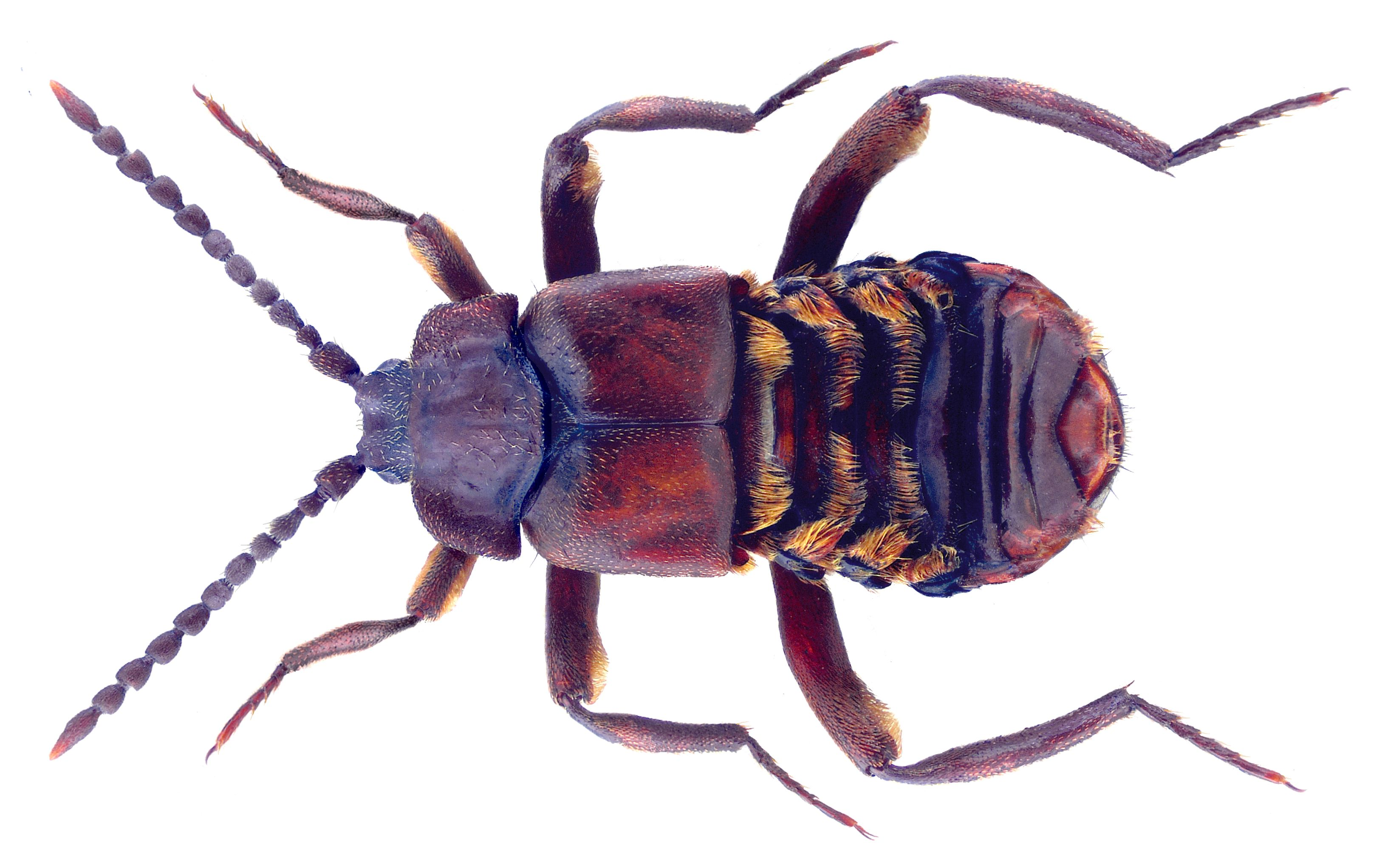
Lomechusoides strumosus

Lomechusoides is a genus of beetles belonging to the family Staphylinidae.

The species of this genus are found in Europe.

Species:

- Lomechusoides amurensis (Wasmann, 1897)
- Lomechusoides folgaricus Jászay, Hlaváč & Baňař, 2023
- Lomechusoides inflatus (Zetterstedt, 1828)
- Lomechusoides strumosus (Fabricus, 1792) - found in association with multiple Formica species, originally believed to be dependent on Formica sanguinea
- Lomechusoides umbrosus - host ant species is Formica polyctena
