= Ocyplanus =

Scientific classification
- Kingdom: Animalia
- Phylum: Arthropoda
- Clade: Pancrustacea
- Class: Insecta
- Order: Coleoptera
- Suborder: Polyphaga
- Infraorder: Staphyliniformia
- Family: Staphylinidae
- Genus: Ocyplanus; Fauvel, 1899

Genus of insects

Ocyplanus is a genus of beetles belonging to the family Staphylinidae.

Species:

- Ocyplanus brevicollis Jacobson & Kistner, 1983
- Ocyplanus formicarius Fauvel, 1899
- Ocyplanus guineanus Pace, 2008
- Ocyplanus megalops Jacobson & Kistner, 1983
- Ocyplanus rotundiceps Jacobson & Kistner, 1983
