= Allardiana =

Scientific classification
- Kingdom: Animalia
- Phylum: Arthropoda
- Class: Insecta
- Order: Coleoptera
- Suborder: Polyphaga
- Infraorder: Staphyliniformia
- Family: Staphylinidae
- Genus: Allardiana; Levasseur, 1966
- Species: A. katangana

Binomial name
- Allardiana katangana Levasseur, 1966

Genus of beetles

Allardiana is a monotypic genus of beetles belonging to the family Staphylinidae. The only species is Allardiana katangana.
