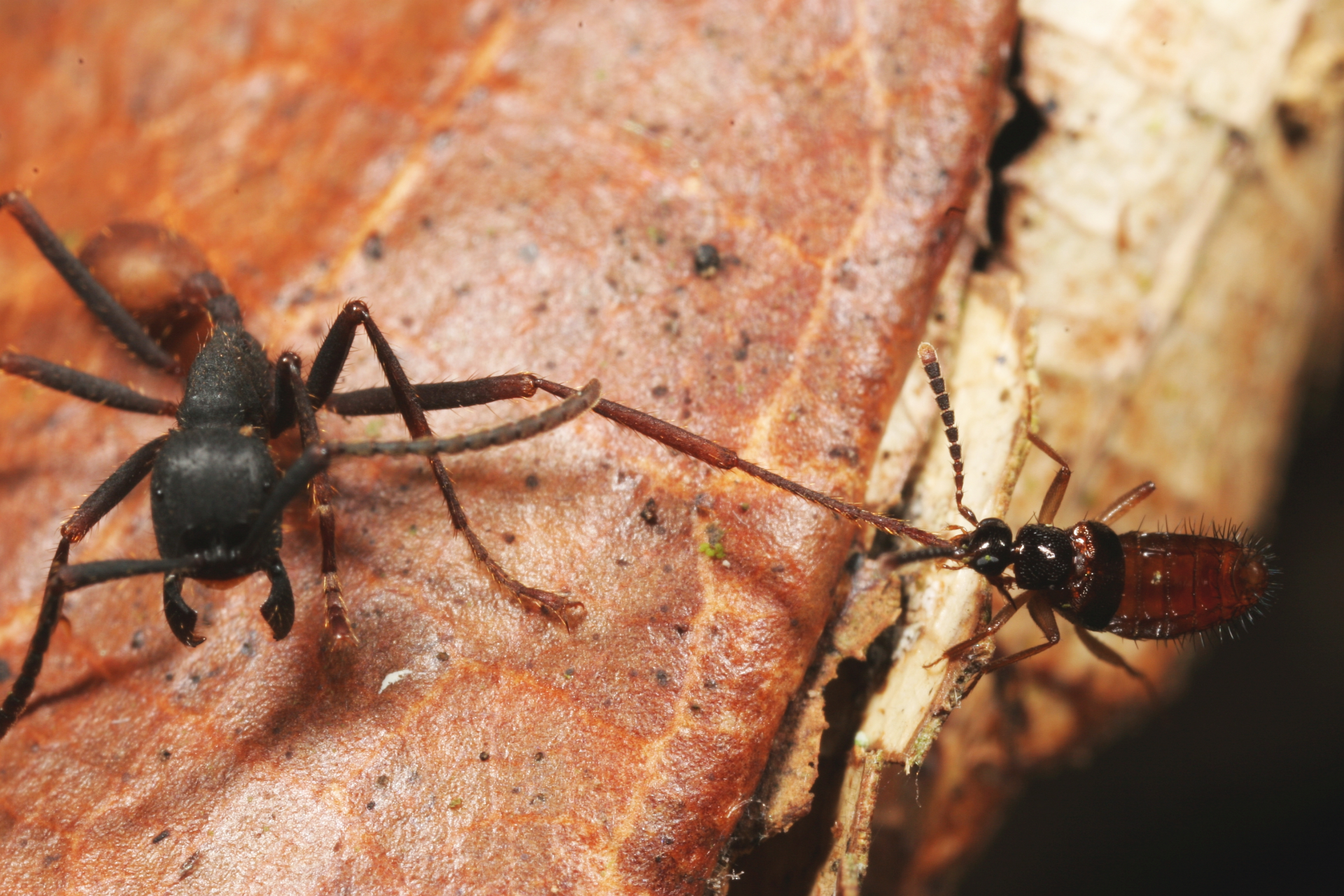
- Tetradonia beetle attacking an adult Eciton burchellii worker ant during a colony emigration

Scientific classification
- Kingdom: Animalia
- Phylum: Arthropoda
- Class: Insecta
- Order: Coleoptera
- Suborder: Polyphaga
- Infraorder: Staphyliniformia
- Family: Staphylinidae
- Tribe: Athetini
- Genus: Tetradonia; Wasmann, 1894

= Tetradonia =

Genus of beetles

Tetradonia is a genus of rove beetles in the family Staphylinidae. There are at least three described species in Tetradonia.

== Species ==
These three species belong to the genus Tetradonia:

- Tetradonia anteopaca Pace, 2015
- Tetradonia guyanensis Pace, 2015
- Tetradonia megalops (Casey, 1906)
