= Lomechusa =

Scientific classification
- Kingdom: Animalia
- Phylum: Arthropoda
- Clade: Pancrustacea
- Class: Insecta
- Order: Coleoptera
- Suborder: Polyphaga
- Infraorder: Staphyliniformia
- Family: Staphylinidae
- Genus: Lomechusa; Gravenhorst, 1806

Genus of beetles

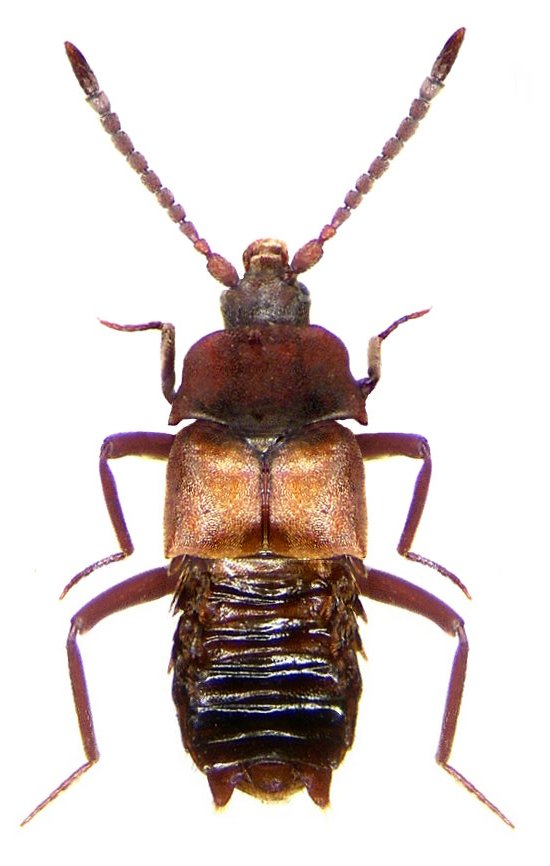
Lomechusa pubicollis

Lomechusa is a genus of beetles belonging to the family Staphylinidae.

The species of this genus are found in Europe and Japan. At least one species (Lomechusa pubicollis) is a highly specialized myrmecophile.

Species:

- Lomechusa atlantica (Koch, 1937)
- Lomechusa barbarae (Schilow, 1977)
- Lomechusa pubicollis (de Barneville, 1860)
