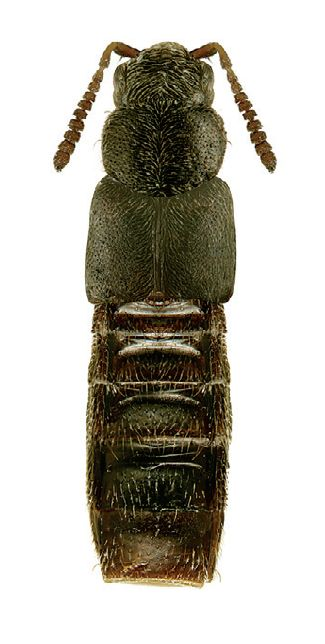
- Atheta novaescotiae

Scientific classification
- Kingdom: Animalia
- Phylum: Arthropoda
- Class: Insecta
- Order: Coleoptera
- Suborder: Polyphaga
- Infraorder: Staphyliniformia
- Family: Staphylinidae
- Subfamily: Aleocharinae
- Tribe: Athetini; Casey, 1910

= Athetini =

Tribe of beetles

Athetini is a tribe of rove beetles in the family Staphylinidae. There are at least 50 genera and 430 described species in Athetini.

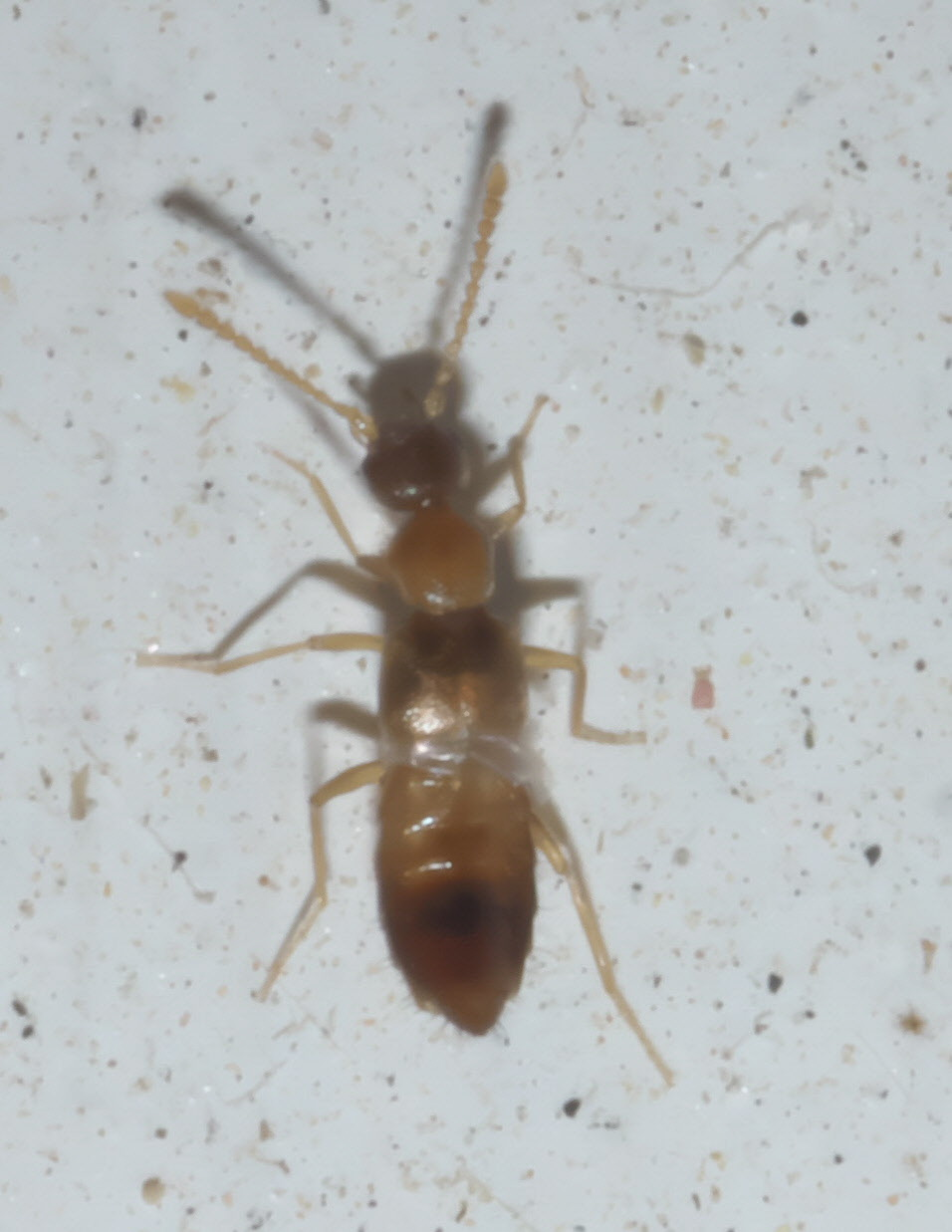
Meronera venustula

== Taxonomy ==
Athetini is one of the most taxonomically complex tribes of Aleocharinae and the limits of the tribe and its internal relationships are the subject of ongoing study. Ecitocharini (Seevers, 1965), was previously considered its own tribe but was recovered as part of Athetini by a phylogenetic study and was therefore synonymized.

== Genera ==
- Acrotona Thomson, 1859
- Adota Casey, 1910
- Aloconota Thomson, 1858
- Amidobia Thomson, 1858
- Amischa Thomson, 1858
- Anatheta Casey, 1910
- Asthenesita Casey, 1893
- Atheta Thomson, 1858
- Boreophilia Benick, 1973
- Boreostiba Lohse in Lohse, Klimaszewski and Smetana, 1990
- Callicerus Gravenhorst, 1802
- Charoxus Sharp, 1883
- Clusiota Casey, 1910
- Crephalia Casey, 1910
- Dalotia Casey, 1910
- Dilacra Thomson, 1858
- Dimetrota Mulsant and Rey, 1873
- Dinaraea Thomson, 1858
- Dochmonota Thomson, 1859
- Earota Mulsant and Rey, 1874
- Emmelostiba Pace, 1982
- Gaenima Casey, 1911
- Geostiba Thomson, 1858
- Goniusa Casey, 1906
- Halobrecta Thomson, 1858
- Halobrecthina Bernhauer, 1909
- Homia Blackwelder, 1952
- Hydrosmecta Thomson, 1858
- Liogluta Thomson, 1858
- Lypoglossa Fenyes, 1918
- Meronera Sharp, 1887
- Micratheta Casey, 1910
- Micrearota Casey, 1910
- Microdota
- Microlia Casey, 1910
- Mocyta Mulsant and Rey, 1874
- Nehemitropia Lohse, 1971
- Paragoniusa Maruyama and Klimaszewski, 2004
- Paraleptonia Klimaszewski in Klimaszewski and Winchester, 2002
- Parameotica Ganglbauer, 1895
- Philhygra Mulsant & Rey, 1873
- Pontomalota Casey, 1885
- Psammostiba Yosii and Sawada, 1976
- Sableta Casey, 1910
- Schistacme Notman, 1920
- Schistoglossa Kraatz, 1876
- Seeversiella Ashe, 1986
- Stethusa Casey, 1910
- Strigota Casey, 1910
- Strophogastra Fenyes, 1921
- Tarphiota Casey, 1893
- Tetradonia Wasmann, 1894
- Thamiaraea Thomson, 1858
- Thinusa Casey, 1893
- Tomoglossa Kraatz, 1856
- Trichiusa Casey, 1893
- Tropimenelytron Pace, 1983
