= List of Atheta species =

This is a list of 449 species in Atheta, a genus of rove beetles in the family Staphylinidae.

== Atheta species ==
- Atheta acadiensis Klimaszewski & Majka, 2007^{g}
- Atheta acromyrmicicola Scheerpeltz, 1976^{g}
- Atheta acutangula Hanssen, 1936^{g}
- Atheta acutiventris Vogel, 2003^{g}
- Atheta admista (Casey, 1910)^{i c g}
- Atheta aegra (Heer, 1841)^{g}
- Atheta aemula (Erichson, 1839)^{i c g}
- Atheta aeneicollis (Sharp, 1869)^{g}
- Atheta aeneipennis (Thomson, 1856)^{g}
- Atheta alabama Klimaszewski and Peck, 1986^{i c g}
- Atheta alamedana Casey, 1910^{i c g}
- Atheta alesi Klimaszewski & Brunke, 2012^{g}
- Atheta algarum Pace, 1999^{g}
- Atheta allocera Eppelsheim, 1893^{g}
- Atheta aloconotoides Pace, 2009^{g}
- Atheta alpigrada Fauvel, 1900^{g}
- Atheta altaica Bernhauer, 1901^{i c g}
- Atheta alterna (Erichson, 1840)^{g}
- Atheta amens Casey, 1911^{i c g}
- Atheta amicorum Lohse, 1973^{g}
- Atheta amicula (Stephens, 1832)^{i c g}
- Atheta ammanni G.Benick, 1970^{g}
- Atheta amplicollis (Mulsant & Rey, 1873)^{g}
- Atheta anmamontis Pace, 2009^{g}
- Atheta anmashanensis Pace, 2009^{g}
- Atheta annexa Casey, 1910^{i c g}
- Atheta antennaria (Fauvel, 1875)^{g}
- Atheta aquatica (Thomson, 1852)^{g}
- Atheta aquatilis (Thomson, 1867)^{g}
- Atheta astuta Casey, 1910^{i c g}
- Atheta atomaria (Kraatz, 1856)^{g}
- Atheta atomica Casey, 1911^{i c g}
- Atheta atramentaria (Gyllenhal, 1810)^{g}
- Atheta atricolor (Sharp, 1869)^{g}
- Atheta audens Casey, 1911^{i c g}
- Atheta autumnalis (Erichson, 1839)^{g}
- Atheta bakeri Bernhauer, 1909^{i c g}
- Atheta baringiana Bernhauer, 1907^{i c g}
- Atheta basicornis (Mulsant & Rey, 1852)^{g}
- Atheta benickiella Brundin, 1948^{g}
- Atheta bidenticauda Bernhauer, 1907^{i c g}
- Atheta bihamata Fauvel, 1900^{g}
- Atheta blatchleyi Bernhauer and Scheerpeltz, 1926^{i c g}
- Atheta boleticola J.Sahlberg, 1876^{g}
- Atheta boletophila (Thomson, 1856)^{g}
- Atheta borealis Klimaszewski & Langor, 2011^{g}
- Atheta boreella Brundin, 1948^{g}
- Atheta botanicarum Muona, 1983^{g}
- Atheta britanniae Bernhauer & Scheerpeltz, 1926^{g}
- Atheta britteni Joy, 1913^{g}
- Atheta brumalis Casey, 1910^{i c g}
- Atheta brunnea (Fabricius, 1798)^{g}
- Atheta brunneipennis (Thomson, 1852)^{g}
- Atheta brunnipes (Mulsant & Rey, 1852)^{g}
- Atheta brunswickensis Klimaszewski in Klimaszewski, Sweeney, Price and Pelletier, 2005^{i c g}
- Atheta burlei Tronquet, 1999^{g}
- Atheta burwelli (Lohse in Lohse, Klimaszewski and Smetana, 1990)^{i c g}
- Atheta cadeti Klimaszewski & Godin, 2008^{g}
- Atheta californica Bernhauer, 1907^{i c g}
- Atheta campbelli (Lohse in Lohse, Klimaszewski and Smetana, 1990)^{i c g}
- Atheta campbelliana (Lohse in Lohse, Klimaszewski and Smetana, 1990)^{i c g}
- Atheta canescens (Sharp, 1869)^{g}
- Atheta capsularis Klimaszewski in Klimaszewski, Sweeney, Price and Pelletier, 2005^{i c g}
- Atheta caribou (Lohse in Lohse, Klimaszewski and Smetana, 1990)^{i c g}
- Atheta cariei Pace, 1984^{g}
- Atheta castanoptera (Mannerheim, 1830)^{g}
- Atheta catula Casey, 1910^{i c g}
- Atheta cauta (Erichson, 1837)^{g}
- Atheta celata (Erichson, 1837)^{g}
- Atheta centropunctata Bernhauer, 1909^{i c g}
- Atheta cephalotes Bernhauer, 1901^{g}
- Atheta cheersae Klimaszewski in Klimaszewski and Winchester, 2002^{i c g}
- Atheta cinnamoptera (Thomson, 1856)^{g}
- Atheta circulicollis Lohse in Lohse, Klimaszewski and Smetana, 1990^{i c g}
- Atheta ciu Pace, 1993^{g}
- Atheta claricella Casey, 1910^{i c g}
- Atheta clienta (Casey, 1911)^{i c g}
- Atheta clientula (Erichson, 1839)^{g}
- Atheta coelifrons (Mulsant & Rey, 1875)^{g}
- Atheta collusina Pace, 2009^{g}
- Atheta concessa Casey, 1911^{i c g}
- Atheta conformis (Erichson, 1840)^{g}
- Atheta confusa (Märkel, 1844)^{g}
- Atheta consueta (Mulsant & Rey, 1874)^{g}
- Atheta contristata (Kraatz, 1856)^{g}
- Atheta convexiuscula (Mulsant & Rey, 1875)^{g}
- Atheta cornelli Pace, 1997^{i c g}
- Atheta coruscula (Casey, 1910)^{i c g}
- Atheta crassicornis (Fabricius, 1793)^{g}
- Atheta crenulata Bernhauer, 1907^{i c g}
- Atheta crenuliventris Bernhauer, 1907^{i c g}
- Atheta cribripennis (J.Sahlberg, 1890)^{g}
- Atheta cryptica (Lohse in Lohse, Klimaszewski and Smetana, 1990)^{i c g}
- Atheta cursor (Mäklin in Mannerheim, 1852)^{i c g}
- Atheta curvaminis Pace, 2009^{g}
- Atheta curvipennis Klimaszewski & Langor, 2011^{g}
- Atheta dadopora Thomson, 1867^{i c g}
- Atheta dama Casey, 1910^{i c g}
- Atheta debilis (Erichson, 1837)^{g}
- Atheta decepta (Mulsant & Rey, 1873)^{g}
- Atheta delumbis Casey, 1911^{i c g}
- Atheta demissa (Notman, 1921)^{i c g}
- Atheta dentiventris Bernhauer, 1907^{g}
- Atheta difficilis (C.Brisout de Barneville, 1860)^{g}
- Atheta diffidens (Casey, 1910)^{i c g}
- Atheta dilaticornis (Kraatz, 1856)^{g}
- Atheta discipula Casey, 1910^{i c g}
- Atheta disparilis (Casey, 1910)^{i c g}
- Atheta districta Casey, 1911^{i c g}
- Atheta diversa (Sharp, 1869)^{g}
- Atheta divisa (Märkel, 1844)^{g}
- Atheta dubiosa Benick, 1934^{g}
- Atheta dwinensis Poppius, 1908^{g}
- Atheta ebenina (Mulsant & Rey, 1873)^{g}
- Atheta ehnstroemi Baranowski, 1982^{g}
- Atheta elephanticola Pace, 1998^{g}
- Atheta enitescens Casey, 1910^{i c g}
- Atheta episcopalis Bernhauer, 1910^{g}
- Atheta ermischi Benick, 1934^{g}
- Atheta esmeraldae Casey, 1911^{i c g}
- Atheta esuriens Assing, 2010
- Atheta europaea Likovský, 1984^{g}
- Atheta euryptera (Stephens, 1832)^{g}
- Atheta excellens (Kraatz, 1856)^{g}
- Atheta excelsa Bernhauer, 1911^{g}
- Atheta fanatica Casey, 1910^{i c g}
- Atheta fascinans (Casey, 1911)^{i c g}
- Atheta fenyesi Bernhauer, 1907^{i c g}
- Atheta festinans (Erichson, 1839)^{i c g}
- Atheta ficta Casey, 1910^{i c g}
- Atheta fimorum (C.Brisout de Barneville, 1860)^{g}
- Atheta finita Moore and Legner, 1975^{i c g}
- Atheta flavipes (Gravenhorst, 1806)^{g}
- Atheta flaviventris (Casey, 1911)^{i c g}
- Atheta formalis (Casey, 1911)^{i c g}
- Atheta formicetorum Bernhauer, 1907^{g}
- Atheta formosanorum Puthz, 1995^{g}
- Atheta fossiceps Scheerpeltz, 1964^{g}
- Atheta foveicollis (Kraatz, 1856)^{g}
- Atheta freta Casey, 1910^{i c g}
- Atheta frigida J.Sahlberg, 1880^{g}
- Atheta frosti Bernhauer, 1909^{i c g}
- Atheta fulgens Bernhauer, 1907^{i c g}
- Atheta fulgida Bernhauer, 1907^{i c g}
- Atheta fulviceps Notman, 1920^{i c g}
- Atheta fungicola (Thomson, 1852)^{g}
- Atheta fungivora (Thomson, 1867)^{g}
- Atheta furtiva Cameron, 1939^{g}
- Atheta fussi (Bernhauer, 1908)^{g}
- Atheta gagatina (Baudi, 1848)^{g}
- Atheta ganglbaueri Brundin, 1948^{g}
- Atheta gigas Pace, 2009^{g}
- Atheta glabricula Thomson, 1867^{g}
- Atheta glabriculoides Strand, 1958^{g}
- Atheta graminicola (Gravenhorst, 1806)^{i c g}
- Atheta haematica (Eppelsheim, 1884)^{g}
- Atheta haligena (Wollaston, 1857)^{g}
- Atheta hamgyongsani Pasnik, 2001^{g}
- Atheta hampshirensis Bernhauer, 1909^{i c g}
- Atheta harwoodi Williams, 1930^{i c g}
- Atheta hepatica (Erichson, 1839)^{g}
- Atheta hesperica (Casey, 1910)^{i c g}
- Atheta heymesi Hubenthal, 1913^{g}
- Atheta hilaris Fenyes, 1909^{i c g}
- Atheta holmbergi Bernhauer, 1907^{i c g}
- Atheta houstoni Casey, 1910^{i c g}
- Atheta hummleri Bernhauer, 1898^{g}
- Atheta hybrida (Sharp, 1869)^{g}
- Atheta hypnorum (Kiesenwetter, 1850)^{g}
- Atheta iheringi Bernhauer, 1908^{g}
- Atheta immucronata Pace, 1999^{g}
- Atheta immunis (Casey, 1910)^{i c}
- Atheta impressipennis Bernhauer, 1909^{i c g}
- Atheta inanis (Casey, 1910)^{i c g}
- Atheta incisicauda Pace, 1984^{g}
- Atheta incisicollis G.Benick, 1981^{g}
- Atheta incognita (Sharp, 1869)^{g}
- Atheta incommoda Brundin, 1948^{g}
- Atheta indubia (Sharp, 1869)^{g}
- Atheta inermis (Fauvel, 1878)^{g}
- Atheta inquinula (Gravenhorst, 1802)^{g}
- Atheta insignicollis (Fauvel, 1878)^{g}
- Atheta insignis (Wollaston, 1854)^{g}
- Atheta insolida (Casey, 1910)^{i c g}
- Atheta intecta (Casey, 1910)^{i c g}
- Atheta intermedia (Thomson, 1852)^{g}
- Atheta invenusta (Casey, 1910)^{i c g}
- Atheta irrita Casey, 1911^{i c g}
- Atheta irrupta (Casey, 1910)^{i c g}
- Atheta ischnocera Thomson, 1870^{g}
- Atheta jangtaesanensis Lee & Ahn^{g}
- Atheta kangsonica Pasnik, 2001^{g}
- Atheta kansana Casey, 1911^{i c g}
- Atheta kaohsiungicola Pace, 2009^{g}
- Atheta kaohsiungnesis Pace, 2009^{g}
- Atheta kaunshanchiensis Pace, 2009^{g}
- Atheta kawachiensis Sawada, 1974^{g}
- Atheta keeni Casey, 1910^{i c g}
- Atheta kerstensi Benick, 1968^{g}
- Atheta klagesi Bernhauer, 1909^{i c g}
- Atheta knabli G.Benick, 1938^{g}
- Atheta kobensis Cameron, 1933^{g}
- Atheta koreana Bernhauer, 1923^{g}
- Atheta kuennemanni G.Benick, 1975^{g}
- Atheta laetula Fenyes, 1909^{i c g}
- Atheta laevana (Mulsant & Rey, 1852)^{g}
- Atheta laevicauda J.Sahlberg, 1876^{g}
- Atheta lagunae (Lohse in Lohse, Klimaszewski and Smetana, 1990)^{i c g}
- Atheta lapponica J.Sahlberg, 1876^{g}
- Atheta laticeps (Thomson, 1856)^{g}
- Atheta laticollis (Stephens, 1832)^{g}
- Atheta latifemorata Brundin, 1940^{g}
- Atheta leileri (Palm, 1981)^{g}
- Atheta leonhardi Bernhauer, 1911^{g}
- Atheta lewisiana Cameron, 1933^{g}
- Atheta liliputana (Brisout de Barneville, 1860)^{g}
- Atheta limulina Casey, 1911^{i c g}
- Atheta linderi (Brisout de Barneville, 1863)^{g}
- Atheta lindrothi Klimaszewski & Langor, 2011^{g}
- Atheta lippa (Casey, 1911)^{i c g}
- Atheta liturata (Stephens, 1832)^{g}
- Atheta longearmata Pace, 2009^{g}
- Atheta longiclava (Casey, 1910)^{i c g}
- Atheta longicornis (Gravenhorst, 1802)^{i c g}
- Atheta lucana (Casey, 1910)^{i c g}
- Atheta lucida (Dodero, 1922)^{g}
- Atheta lucifuga Klimaszewski and Peck, 1986^{i c g}
- Atheta luctifera Bernhauer, 1906^{i c g}
- Atheta luctuosa (Mulsant & Rey, 1853)^{g}
- Atheta luridipennis (Mannerheim, 1830)^{g}
- Atheta luridipennoides Pace, 2009^{g}
- Atheta lymphatica Casey, 1911^{i c g}
- Atheta macrocera (Thomson, 1856)^{g}
- Atheta macrops Notman, 1920^{i c g}
- Atheta malleiformis G.Benick, 1975^{g}
- Atheta malleus Joy, 1913^{g}
- Atheta marcescens Casey, 1911^{i c g}
- Atheta marcida (Erichson, 1837)^{g}
- Atheta mariei Sainte-Claire Deville, 1927^{g}
- Atheta marinica Casey, 1910^{i c g}
- Atheta martini Lohse in Lohse, Klimaszewski and Smetana, 1990^{i c g}
- Atheta membranata G.Benick, 1974^{g}
- Atheta metlakatlana Bernhauer, 1909^{i c g}
- Atheta microelytrata Klimaszewski & Godin, 2012^{g}
- Atheta microparvula Pace, 2009^{g}
- Atheta militaris Bernhauer, 1909^{i c g}
- Atheta mina (Casey, 1910)^{i c g}
- Atheta miniscula (Brisout, 1860)^{g}
- Atheta minuscula (Brisout de Barneville, 1859)^{g}
- Atheta modesta (Melsheimer, 1844)^{i c g}
- Atheta monacha Bernhauer, 1899^{g}
- Atheta monticola (Thomson, 1852)^{g}
- Atheta muris Sawada, 1974^{g}
- Atheta myrmecobia (Kraatz, 1856)^{g}
- Atheta nacta Casey, 1911^{i c g}
- Atheta nanella (Casey, 1906)^{i c g}
- Atheta nearctica (Lohse in Lohse, Klimaszewski and Smetana, 1990)^{i c g}
- Atheta negligens (Mulsant & Rey, 1873)^{g}
- Atheta neomexicana Fenyes, 1909^{i c g}
- Atheta nescia (Casey, 1910)^{i c g}
- Atheta nesslingi Bernhauer, 1928^{g}
- Atheta nidicola (Johansen, 1914)^{g}
- Atheta nigra (Kraatz, 1856)^{g}
- Atheta nigricornis (Thomson, 1852)^{i c g}
- Atheta nigrifrons (Erichson, 1839)^{g}
- Atheta nigripennis (Erichson, 1839)^{g}
- Atheta nigripes (Thomson, 1856)^{g}
- Atheta nigrita Fenyes, 1909^{i c g}
- Atheta nigritula (Gravenhorst, 1802)^{i c g}
- Atheta novaescotiae Klimaszewski & Majka in Klimaszewski, Majka & Langor, 2006^{i c g b}
- Atheta nugator Casey, 1911^{i c g}
- Atheta oblita (Erichson, 1839)^{g}
- Atheta obsequens Casey, 1911^{i c g}
- Atheta obtusangula Joy, 1913^{g}
- Atheta occidentalis Bernhauer, 1906^{i c g}
- Atheta occulta (Erichson, 1837)^{g}
- Atheta olaae Sharp, 1908^{i c g}
- Atheta oraria (Kraatz, 1856)^{g}
- Atheta orbata (Erichson, 1837)^{g}
- Atheta orcina (Fauvel, 1875)^{g}
- Atheta ordinata Casey, 1910^{i c g}
- Atheta oregonensis Bernhauer, 1909^{i c g}
- Atheta orphana (Erichson, 1837)^{g}
- Atheta oxypodoides Brundin, 1952^{g}
- Atheta pachycera (Eppelsheim, 1893)^{g}
- Atheta pacifica (Casey, 1910)^{i c g}
- Atheta paedida (Erichson, 1840)^{g}
- Atheta paganella Casey, 1910^{i c g}
- Atheta palleola (Erichson, 1837)^{g}
- Atheta pallidicornis (Thomson, 1856)^{i c g}
- Atheta pandionis Scheerpeltz, 1958^{g}
- Atheta paracrassicornis Brundin, 1954^{g}
- Atheta parapicipennis Brundin, 1954^{g}
- Atheta parcior Bernhauer, 1927^{g}
- Atheta particula (Casey, 1910)^{i c g}
- Atheta parvicornis (Mulsant & Rey, 1873)^{g}
- Atheta parvipennis Bernhauer, 1907^{i c g}
- Atheta pasniki Lee & Ahn^{g}
- Atheta pavidula Casey, 1911^{i c g}
- Atheta pechlaneri Scheerpeltz, 1933^{g}
- Atheta pecki Klimaszewski & Langor, 2011^{g}
- Atheta pedicularis (Melsheimer, 1844)^{i c g}
- Atheta peinantaensis Pace, 2009^{g}
- Atheta peinantamontis Pace, 2009^{g}
- Atheta pennsylvanica Bernhauer, 1907^{i c g b}
- Atheta peregrina (Kraatz, 1859)^{g}
- Atheta perpera Casey, 1910^{i c g}
- Atheta personata (Casey, 1910)^{i c g}
- Atheta pervagata Benick, 1975^{g}
- Atheta perversa Casey, 1910^{i c g}
- Atheta pfaundleri Benick, 1940^{g}
- Atheta picipennis (Mannerheim, 1843)^{i c g}
- Atheta picipennoides Hanssen, 1932^{g}
- Atheta picipes (Thomson, 1856)^{g}
- Atheta pilicornis (Thomson, 1852)^{g}
- Atheta piligera J.Sahlberg, 1876^{g}
- Atheta pimalis (Casey, 1910)^{i c g}
- Atheta pittionii Scheerpeltz, 1950^{g}
- Atheta platanoffi Brundin, 1948^{i c g}
- Atheta platonoffi Brundin, 1948^{g}
- Atheta portusveneris Normand, 1920^{g}
- Atheta praesaga (Casey, 1910)^{i c g}
- Atheta pratensis (Mäklin in Mannerheim, 1852)^{i c g}
- Atheta procera (Kraatz, 1856)^{g}
- Atheta promota Casey, 1910^{i c g}
- Atheta properans Casey, 1910^{i c g}
- Atheta prudhoensis (Lohse in Lohse, Klimaszewski and Smetana, 1990)^{i c g}
- Atheta pruinosa (Kraatz, 1856)^{g}
- Atheta pseudoatomaria Bernhauer, 1909^{i c g}
- Atheta pseudocrenuliventris Klimaszewski in Klimaszewski, Sweeney, Price and Pelletier, 2005^{i c g}
- Atheta pseudodistricta Klimaszewski & Langor, 2011^{g}
- Atheta pseudoelogantula (Bernhauer, 1807)^{g}
- Atheta pseudomembranata Tronquet, 2007^{g}
- Atheta pseudometlakatlana Klimaszewski & Godin, 2008^{g}
- Atheta pseudomodesta Klimaszewski, 2007^{g}
- Atheta pseudosubtilis Klimaszewski & Langor, 2011^{g}
- Atheta pseudovilis Bernhauer, 1907^{i c g}
- Atheta pugnans Fenyes, 1920^{i c g}
- Atheta puncticollis Benick, 1938^{g}
- Atheta putrida (Kraatz, 1856)^{g}
- Atheta pyongangsani Pasnik, 2001^{g}
- Atheta quadricarinata Pace, 2009^{g}
- Atheta quaesita (Casey, 1910)^{i c g}
- Atheta quercea Tronquet, 2012^{g}
- Atheta ravilla (Erichson, 1839)^{g}
- Atheta reformata Casey, 1911^{i c g}
- Atheta regenerans Casey, 1911^{i c g}
- Atheta regissalmonis (Lohse in Lohse, Klimaszewski and Smetana, 1990)^{i c g}
- Atheta reissi G.Benick, 1936^{g}
- Atheta reitteriana Bernhauer, 1939^{g}
- Atheta relicta Casey, 1911^{i c g}
- Atheta remissa (Casey, 1910)^{i c g}
- Atheta remulsa Casey, 1910^{i c g}
- Atheta reposita Casey, 1910^{i c g}
- Atheta restricta Casey, 1911^{i c}
- Atheta reticula Casey, 1910^{i c g}
- Atheta reunionensis Pace, 1984^{g}
- Atheta rhenana G.Benick, 1965^{g}
- Atheta ringi Klimaszewski in Klimaszewski and Winchester, 2002^{i c g}
- Atheta riparia Klimaszewski & Godin, 2012^{g}
- Atheta ririkoae Sawada, 1989^{g}
- Atheta rugulosa (Heer, 1839)^{g}
- Atheta rurigena Casey, 1911^{i c g}
- Atheta sana Casey, 1910^{i c g}
- Atheta sanguinolenta (Wollaston, 1854)^{g}
- Atheta savardae Klimaszewski & Majka, 2007^{g}
- Atheta scapularis (Sahlberg, 1831)^{g}
- Atheta scrobicollis (Kraatz, 1859)^{g}
- Atheta sculptisoma Klimaszewski & Langor, 2011^{g}
- Atheta semidentiventris Lee & Ahn^{g}
- Atheta sequanica (C.Brisout de Barneville, 1860)^{g}
- Atheta serrata Benick, 1938^{g}
- Atheta setigera (Sharp, 1869)^{g}
- Atheta silvatica Bernhauer, 1907^{g}
- Atheta sitiens (Casey, 1910)^{i c g}
- Atheta smetanai (Lohse in Lohse, Klimaszewski and Smetana, 1990)^{i c g}
- Atheta smetanaiella Pace, 2009^{g}
- Atheta sodalis (Erichson, 1837)^{i c g}
- Atheta sogai Pace, 1984^{g}
- Atheta sogamensis Pasnik, 2001^{g}
- Atheta sordida ^{b}
- Atheta sordidula (Erichson, 1837)^{g}
- Atheta sparreschneideri Munster, 1922^{i c g}
- Atheta sparsepunctata Bernhauer, 1907^{i c g}
- Atheta spatula (Fauvel, 1875)^{g}
- Atheta spatuloides Benick, 1939^{g}
- Atheta speluncicollis Bernhauer, 1909^{g}
- Atheta spiniventris Bernhauer, 1907^{g}
- Atheta spinula Sawada, 1970^{g}
- Atheta stercoris Fenyes, 1920^{i c g}
- Atheta stoica Casey, 1911^{i c g}
- Atheta strandiella Brundin, 1954^{g}
- Atheta strigosula Casey, 1910^{i c g}
- Atheta subcavicola (Brisout de Barneville, 1863)^{g}
- Atheta subcrenulata Bernhauer, 1907^{g}
- Atheta subglabra (Sharp, 1869)^{g}
- Atheta sublucens Bernhauer, 1909^{i c g}
- Atheta subnigritula Cameron, 1950^{g}
- Atheta subrugosa (Kiesenwetter, 1848)^{g}
- Atheta subsinuata (Erichson, 1839)^{g}
- Atheta subterranea (Mulsant & Rey, 1853)^{g}
- Atheta subtilis (Scriba, 1866)^{g}
- Atheta sundti Strand, 1971^{g}
- Atheta surgens (Casey, 1910)^{i c g}
- Atheta suspiciosa (Motschulsky, 1858)^{g}
- Atheta taichungensis Puthz, 1995^{g}
- Atheta taiwafallax Pace, 2009^{g}
- Atheta taiwamontana Pace, 2009^{g}
- Atheta taiwanensis Puthz, 1995^{g}
- Atheta taiwanultima Pace, 2009^{g}
- Atheta taiwaparva Pace, 2009^{g}
- Atheta taiwasolitaria Pace, 2009^{g}
- Atheta talpa (Heer, 1841)^{g}
- Atheta taxiceroides Munster, 1935^{g}
- Atheta temporalis Casey, 1910^{i c g}
- Atheta tepida (Casey, 1910)^{i c g}
- Atheta terranovae Klimaszewski & Langor, 2011^{g}
- Atheta testaceipes (Heer, 1839)^{g}
- Atheta texana Casey, 1910^{i c g}
- Atheta thulea Poppius, 1909^{g}
- Atheta tibialis (Heer, 1839)^{g}
- Atheta tokiokai Sawada, 1971^{g}
- Atheta tonensis Pace, 2009^{g}
- Atheta tractabilis Casey, 1910^{i c g}
- Atheta trangrediens G.Benick, 1974^{g}
- Atheta transposita (Mulsant & Rey, 1875)^{g}
- Atheta triangulum (Kraatz, 1856)^{g}
- Atheta trinotata (Kraatz, 1856)^{g}
- Atheta troglophila Klimaszewski and Peck, 1986^{i c g}
- Atheta truncativentris Bernhauer, 1907^{i c g}
- Atheta tubericauda Bernhauer, 1909^{i c g}
- Atheta turpicola (Casey, 1910)^{i c g}
- Atheta umbonalis Casey, 1910^{i c g}
- Atheta unica (Casey, 1910)^{i c g}
- Atheta unigena Casey, 1910^{i c g}
- Atheta vacans (Casey, 1910)^{i c g}
- Atheta vaga Heer, 1839^{g}
- Atheta varendorffiana Bernhauer & Scheerpeltz, 1934^{g}
- Atheta ventricosa Bernhauer, 1907^{i c g b}
- Atheta vestita (Gravenhorst, 1806)^{g}
- Atheta vicaria (Casey, 1910)^{g}
- Atheta voeslauensis Bernhauer, 1944^{g}
- Atheta vomerum Pace, 2009^{g}
- Atheta weedi Casey, 1910^{i c g}
- Atheta whitehorsensis Klimaszewski & Godin, 2012^{g}
- Atheta wireni Brundin, 1948^{g}
- Atheta wrangeli (Casey, 1910)^{i c g}
- Atheta xanthopus (Thomson, 1856)^{g}
- Atheta zealandica Cameron, 1945^{g}
- Atheta zosterae (Thomson, 1856)^{g}

Data sources: i = ITIS, c = Catalogue of Life, g = GBIF, b = Bugguide.net
