= Geostibini =

Scientific classification
- Kingdom: Animalia
- Phylum: Arthropoda
- Clade: Pancrustacea
- Class: Insecta
- Order: Coleoptera
- Suborder: Polyphaga
- Infraorder: Staphyliniformia
- Family: Staphylinidae
- Subfamily: Aleocharinae
- Tribe: Geostibini; Seevers, 1978

Tribe of rove beetles

Geostibini is a tribe of rove beetles in the subfamily Aleocharinae. It was first described by Seevers in 1978. It contains 13 genera, with 912 accepted species.

== Genera ==
- Alevonota
- Aloconota
- Callicerus
- Chinecallicerus
- Earota
- Geostiba
- Homoiocalea
- Micrearota
- Pelioptera
- Pseudosmiris
- Saphocallus
- Seeversiella
- Tropimenelyton
