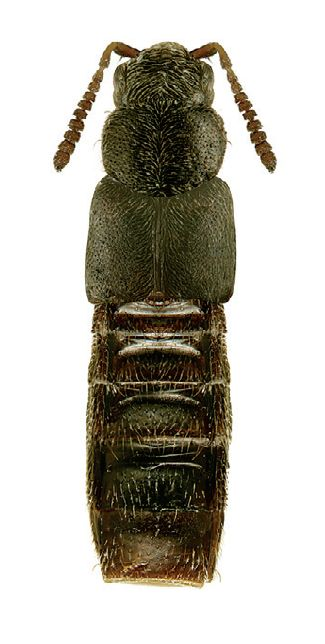

Scientific classification
- Kingdom: Animalia
- Phylum: Arthropoda
- Class: Insecta
- Order: Coleoptera
- Suborder: Polyphaga
- Infraorder: Staphyliniformia
- Family: Staphylinidae
- Genus: Atheta
- Species: A. novaescotiae

Binomial name
- Atheta novaescotiae Klimaszewski & Majka in Klimaszewski, Majka & Langor, 2006

= Atheta novaescotiae =

Species of beetle

Atheta novaescotiae is a species of rove beetle in the family Staphylinidae. It is found in North America. It lives in a marine seashore environment, and has adaptations similar to rove beetles of the genus Tarphiota, which also live in these habitats.
