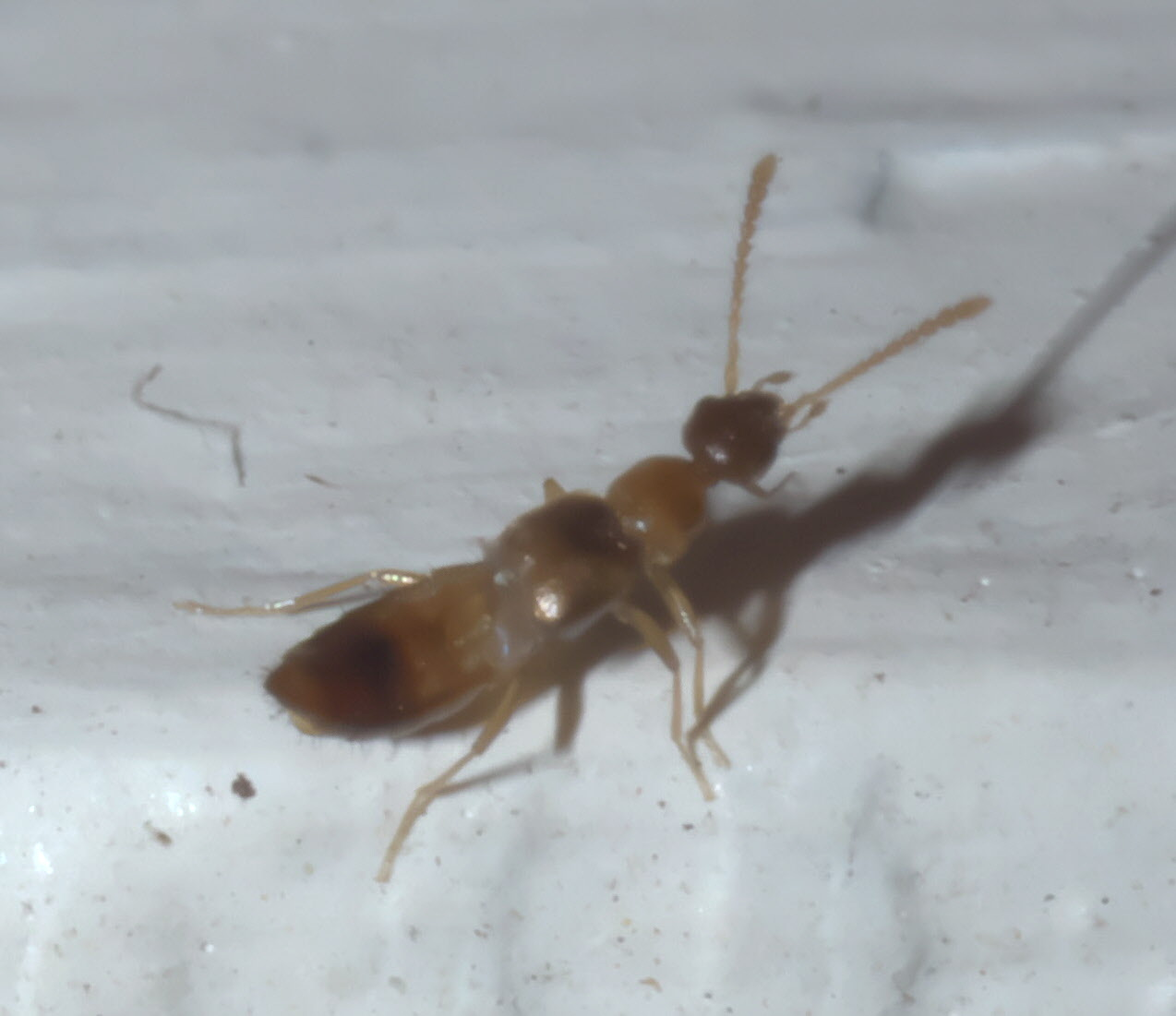
- Meronera venustula

Scientific classification
- Kingdom: Animalia
- Phylum: Arthropoda
- Class: Insecta
- Order: Coleoptera
- Suborder: Polyphaga
- Infraorder: Staphyliniformia
- Family: Staphylinidae
- Tribe: Athetini
- Genus: Meronera; Sharp, 1887

= Meronera =

Genus of beetles

Meronera is a genus of rove beetles in the family Staphylinidae. There are at least four described species in Meronera.

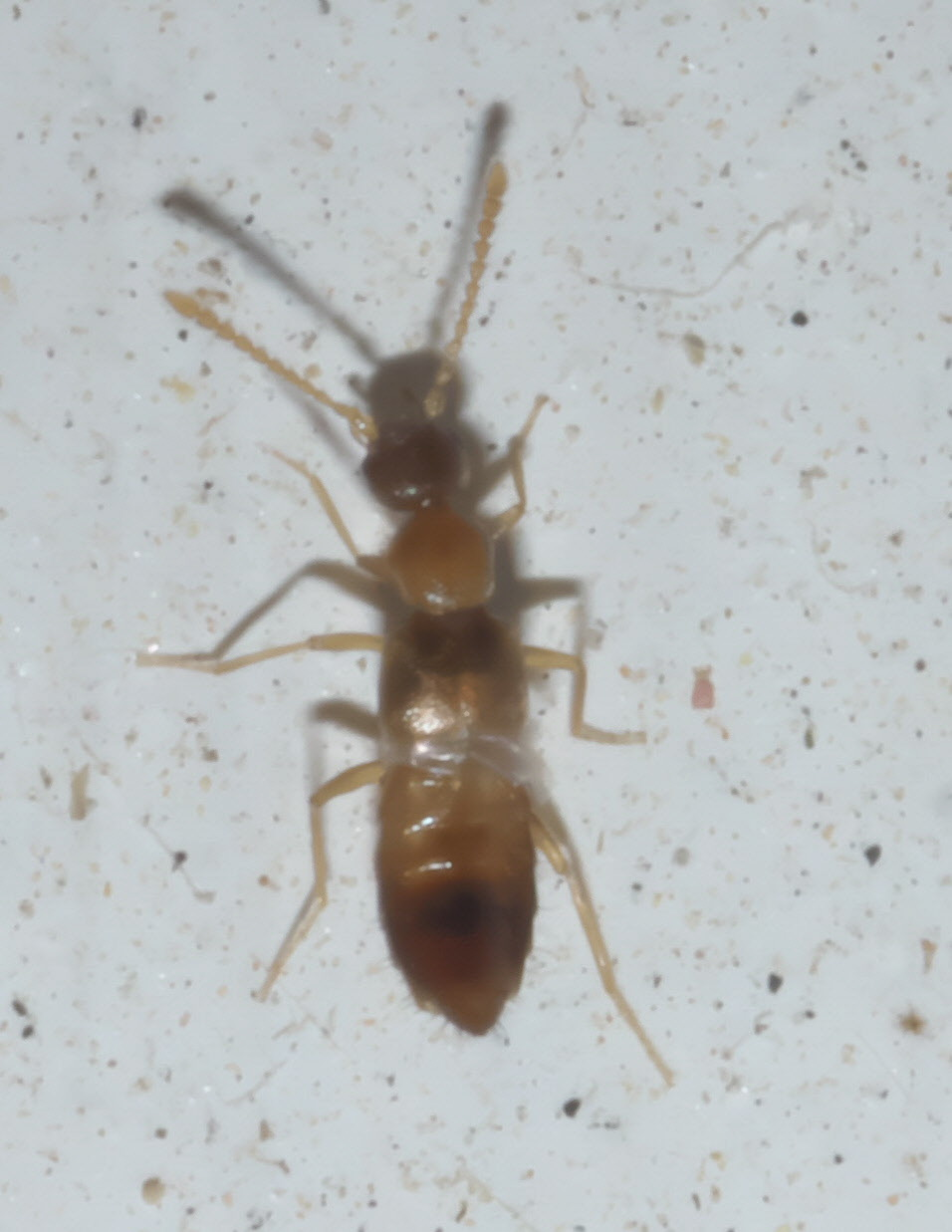
Meronera venustula

== Species ==
These four species belong to the genus Meronera:

- Meronera albicincta (Erichson, 1839)
- Meronera montana Casey, 1906
- Meronera obliqua Casey, 1906
- Meronera venustula (Erichson, 1839)
