= Acrotona austiniana =

Scientific classification
- Kingdom: Animalia
- Phylum: Arthropoda
- Class: Insecta
- Order: Coleoptera
- Suborder: Polyphaga
- Infraorder: Staphyliniformia
- Family: Staphylinidae
- Genus: Acrotona
- Species: A. austiniana

Binomial name
- Acrotona austiniana (Casey, 1910)

Species of beetle

Acrotona austiniana is a species of rove beetle in the family Staphylinidae. It is found in North America.
