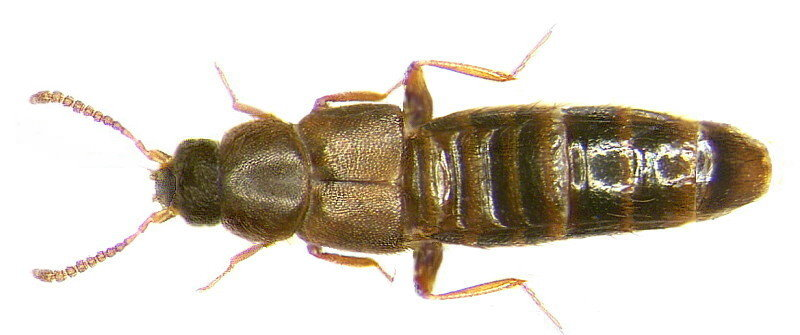
- 3.2–3.8 mm

Scientific classification
- Domain: Eukaryota
- Kingdom: Animalia
- Phylum: Arthropoda
- Class: Insecta
- Order: Coleoptera
- Suborder: Polyphaga
- Infraorder: Staphyliniformia
- Family: Staphylinidae
- Genus: Thamiaraea
- Species: T. hospita

Binomial name
- Thamiaraea hospita (Maerkel, 1844)

= Thamiaraea hospita =

Species of beetle

Thamiaraea hospita is a species of rove beetle native to Europe.
