= Alevonota rufotestacea =

Scientific classification
- Domain: Eukaryota
- Kingdom: Animalia
- Phylum: Arthropoda
- Class: Insecta
- Order: Coleoptera
- Suborder: Polyphaga
- Infraorder: Staphyliniformia
- Family: Staphylinidae
- Genus: Alevonota
- Species: A. rufotestacea

Binomial name
- Alevonota rufotestacea (Kraatz, 1856)

Species of beetle

Alevonota rufotestacea is a species of beetle belonging to the family Staphylinidae.

It is native to Europe.
