= Liogluta falcata =

Scientific classification
- Kingdom: Animalia
- Phylum: Arthropoda
- Clade: Pancrustacea
- Class: Insecta
- Order: Coleoptera
- Suborder: Polyphaga
- Infraorder: Staphyliniformia
- Family: Staphylinidae
- Genus: Liogluta
- Species: L. falcata

Binomial name
- Liogluta falcata Assing, 2010

Species of beetle

Liogluta falcata is a species of rove beetles first found in Turkey.
