= Thinusa fletcheri =

Scientific classification
- Kingdom: Animalia
- Phylum: Arthropoda
- Class: Insecta
- Order: Coleoptera
- Suborder: Polyphaga
- Infraorder: Staphyliniformia
- Family: Staphylinidae
- Genus: Thinusa
- Species: T. fletcheri

Binomial name
- Thinusa fletcheri Casey, 1906

Species of beetle

Thinusa fletcheri is a species of "sea shore genus" in the beetle family Staphylinidae. It is found in North America.
