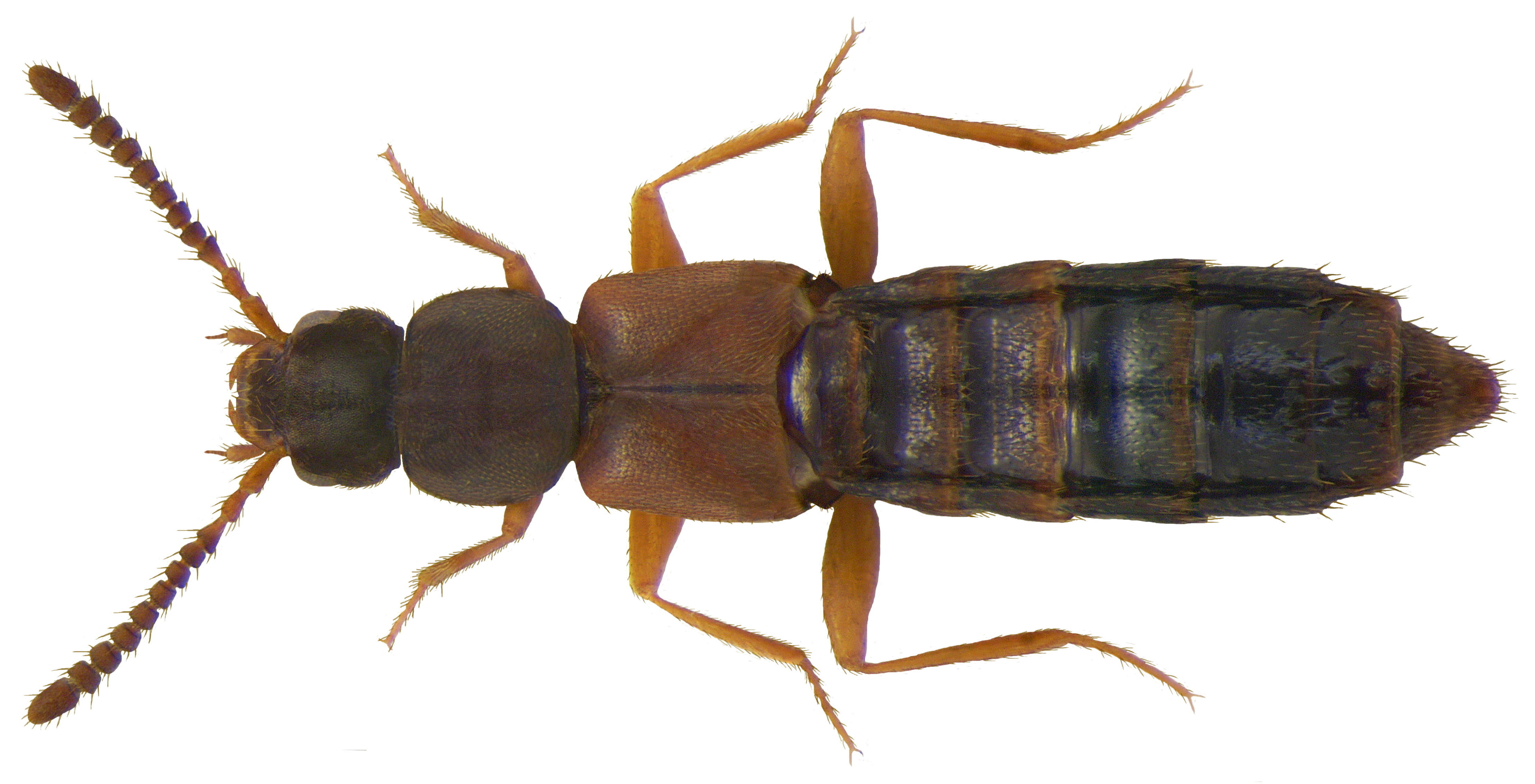

Scientific classification
- Kingdom: Animalia
- Phylum: Arthropoda
- Class: Insecta
- Order: Coleoptera
- Suborder: Polyphaga
- Infraorder: Staphyliniformia
- Family: Staphylinidae
- Genus: Dinaraea
- Species: D. aequata

Binomial name
- Dinaraea aequata (Erichson, 1837)

= Dinaraea aequata =

Species of beetle

Dinaraea aequata is a species of rove beetle native to Europe.
