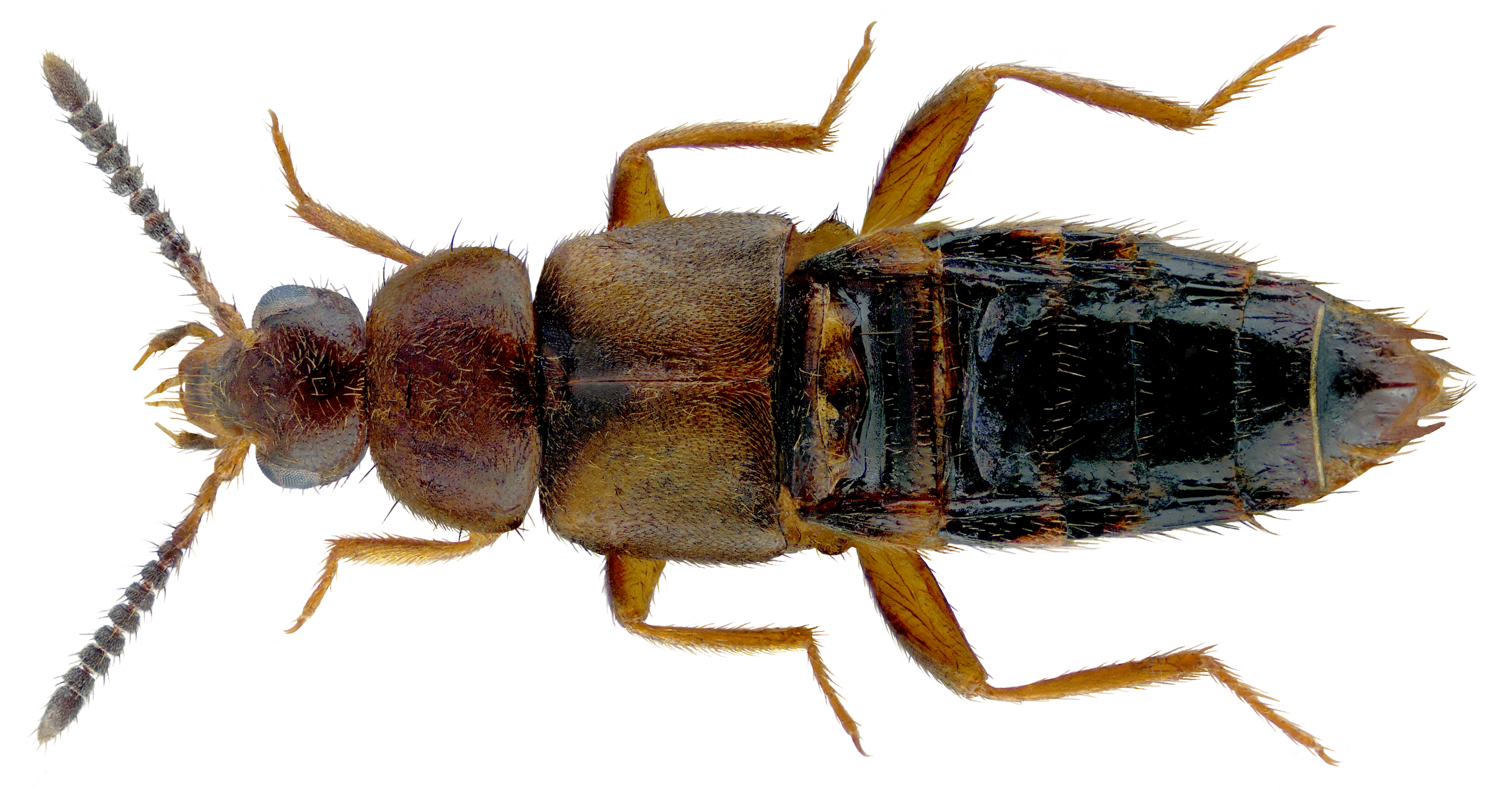
- Thamiaraea cinnamomea

Scientific classification
- Kingdom: Animalia
- Phylum: Arthropoda
- Clade: Pancrustacea
- Class: Insecta
- Order: Coleoptera
- Suborder: Polyphaga
- Infraorder: Staphyliniformia
- Family: Staphylinidae
- Subfamily: Aleocharinae
- Tribe: Athetini
- Genus: Thamiaraea; Thomson, 1858

= Thamiaraea =

Genus of beetles

Thamiaraea is a genus of beetles belonging to the family Staphylinidae. It was established in 1858 by Carl Gustaf Thomson.

This genus has cosmopolitan distribution.

Species include:

- Thamiaraea americana Bernhauer, 1907
- Thamiaraea brittoni (Casey, 1910) (= T.lira, T.paralira)
- Thamiaraea cinnamomea
- Thamiaraea cognata Sharp, 1883
- Thamiaraea hospita (Märkel, 1844)
- Thamiaraea salvini Sharp, 1883
- Thamiaraea tsitsilasi Pace
- Thamiaraea variegata Sharp, 1883
