= Goniusa =

Scientific classification
- Kingdom: Animalia
- Phylum: Arthropoda
- Class: Insecta
- Order: Coleoptera
- Suborder: Polyphaga
- Infraorder: Staphyliniformia
- Family: Staphylinidae
- Tribe: Athetini
- Genus: Goniusa; Casey, 1906

Genus of beetles

Goniusa is a genus of rove beetles in the family Staphylinidae. There are at least three described species in Goniusa.

== Species ==
These three species belong to the genus Goniusa:

- Goniusa alperti Kistner, 1976
- Goniusa carrorum Maruyama & Klimaszewski, 2004
- Goniusa caseyi Gusarov, 2003
