= Tarphiota geniculata =

Scientific classification
- Kingdom: Animalia
- Phylum: Arthropoda
- Clade: Pancrustacea
- Class: Insecta
- Order: Coleoptera
- Suborder: Polyphaga
- Infraorder: Staphyliniformia
- Family: Staphylinidae
- Genus: Tarphiota
- Species: T. geniculata

Binomial name
- Tarphiota geniculata (Mäklin in Mannerheim, 1852)

Species of beetle

Tarphiota geniculata is a species in the family of beetles known as Staphylinidae. It is found in North America,, preferring a habitat of sandy beaches associated with kelp wrack. They are active at night, hiding under kelp during the day.
