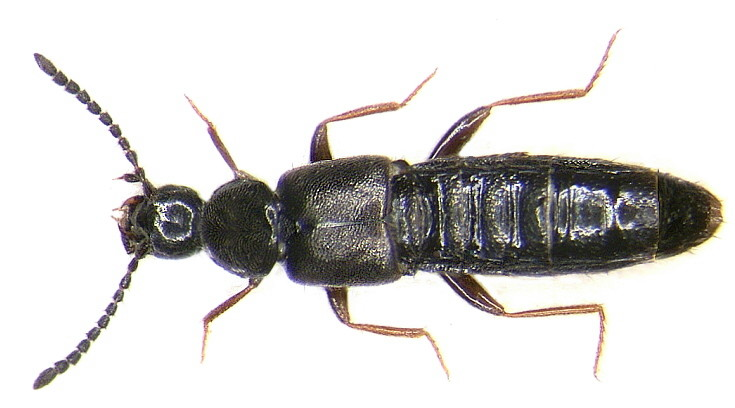
- 4.0–4.5 mm

Scientific classification
- Domain: Eukaryota
- Kingdom: Animalia
- Phylum: Arthropoda
- Class: Insecta
- Order: Coleoptera
- Suborder: Polyphaga
- Infraorder: Staphyliniformia
- Family: Staphylinidae
- Genus: Atheta
- Species: A. graminicola

Binomial name
- Atheta graminicola Gravenhorst, 1806

= Atheta graminicola =

Species of beetle

Atheta graminicola is a species of rove beetles native to Europe.
