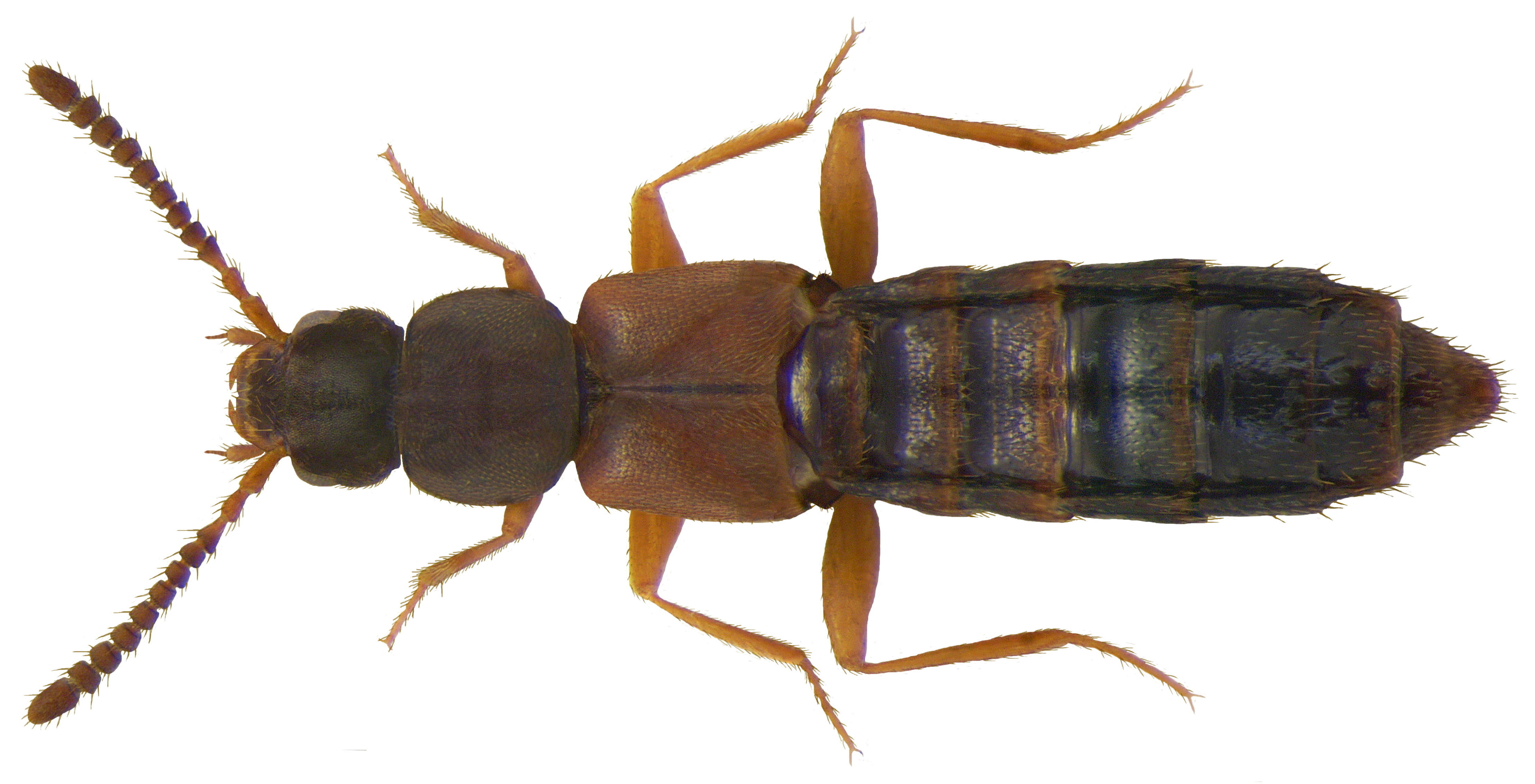
- Dinaraea aequata

Scientific classification
- Kingdom: Animalia
- Phylum: Arthropoda
- Clade: Pancrustacea
- Class: Insecta
- Order: Coleoptera
- Suborder: Polyphaga
- Infraorder: Staphyliniformia
- Family: Staphylinidae
- Subfamily: Aleocharinae
- Tribe: Athetini
- Subtribe: Athetina
- Genus: Dinaraea; Thomson, 1858

= Dinaraea =

Genus of beetles

Dinaraea is a genus of rove beetles in the family Staphylinidae. There are about 16 described species in Dinaraea.

== Species ==
These 16 species belong to the genus Dinaraea:

- Dinaraea aequata (Erichson, 1837)
- Dinaraea angustula (Gyllenhal, 1810)
- Dinaraea arcana (Erichson, 1839)
- Dinaraea backusensis Klimaszewski & Brunke, 2012
- Dinaraea bicornis Klimaszewski & Webster, 2013
- Dinaraea borealis Lohse in Lohse, Klimaszewski & Smetana, 1990
- Dinaraea curtipenis Klimaszewski & Webster, 2013
- Dinaraea linearis (Gravenhorst, 1802)
- Dinaraea longipenis Klimaszewski & Webster, 2013
- Dinaraea melanocornis Mulsant & Rey, 1873
- Dinaraea pacei Klimaszewski & Langor, 2011
- Dinaraea piceana Klimaszewski & Jacobs, 2013
- Dinaraea planaris (Mäklin in Mannerheim, 1852)
- Dinaraea quadricornis Klimaszewski & Webster, 2013
- Dinaraea subdepressa (Bernhauer, 1907)
- Dinaraea worki Klimaszewski & Jacobs, 2013
