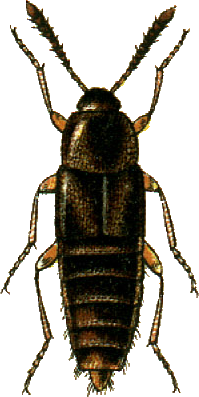

Scientific classification
- Kingdom: Animalia
- Phylum: Arthropoda
- Class: Insecta
- Order: Coleoptera
- Suborder: Polyphaga
- Infraorder: Staphyliniformia
- Family: Staphylinidae
- Genus: Nehemitropia
- Species: N. lividipennis

Binomial name
- Nehemitropia lividipennis (Mannerheim, 1830)

= Nehemitropia lividipennis =

Species of beetle

Nehemitropia lividipennis is a species of rove beetle in the family Staphylinidae. It is found in Europe and Northern Asia (excluding China) and North America.
