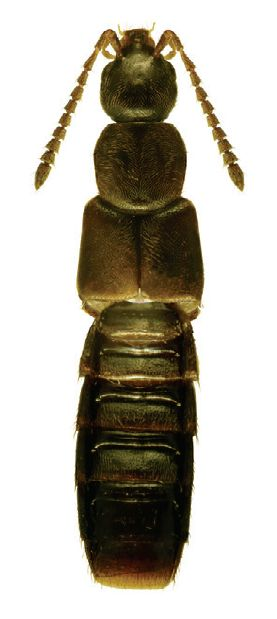

Scientific classification
- Domain: Eukaryota
- Kingdom: Animalia
- Phylum: Arthropoda
- Class: Insecta
- Order: Coleoptera
- Suborder: Polyphaga
- Infraorder: Staphyliniformia
- Family: Staphylinidae
- Genus: Aloconota
- Species: A. sulcifrons

Binomial name
- Aloconota sulcifrons Stephens, 1832

= Aloconota sulcifrons =

Species of beetle

Aloconota sulcifrons is a species of rove beetles native to Europe.
