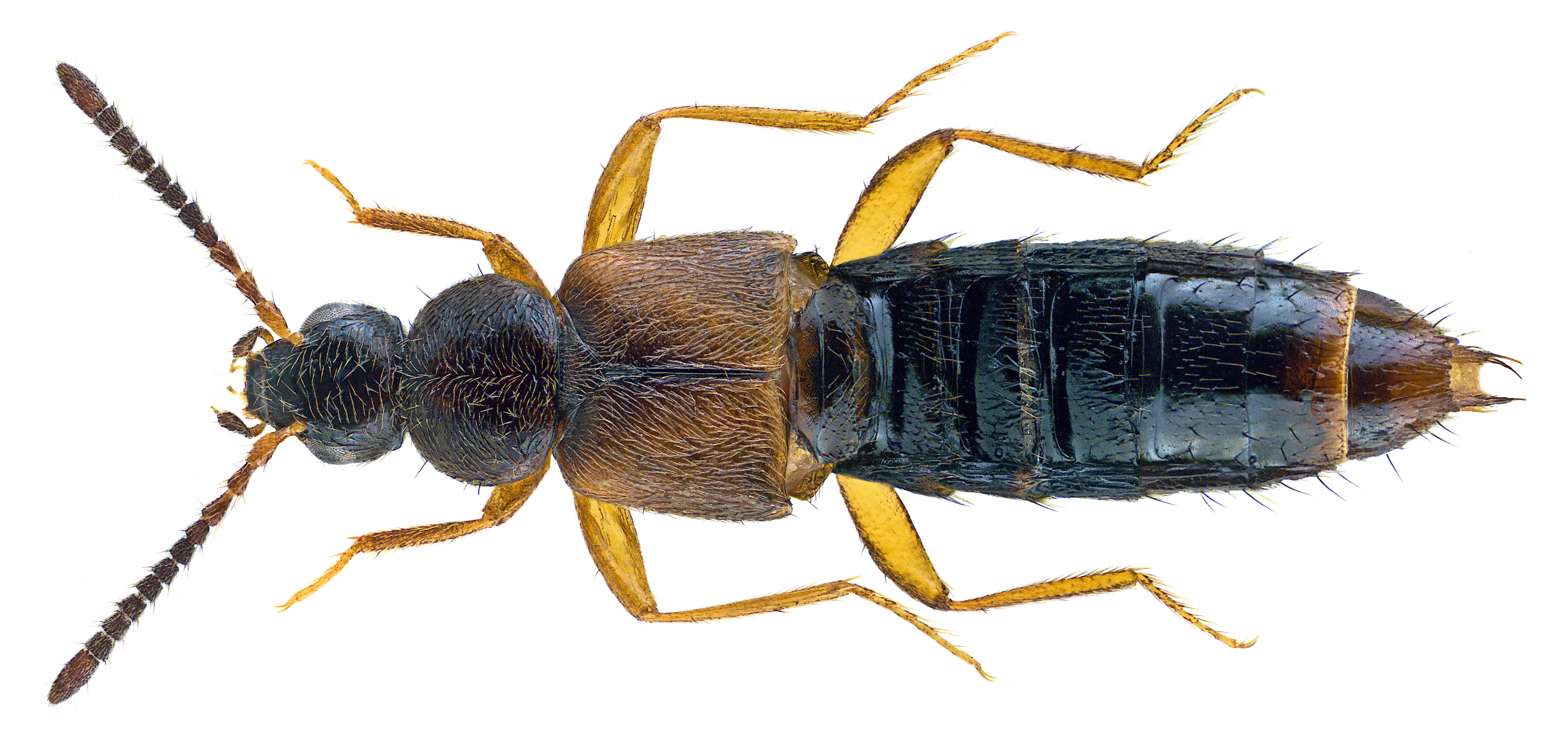
- 4.3 mm long

Scientific classification
- Domain: Eukaryota
- Kingdom: Animalia
- Phylum: Arthropoda
- Class: Insecta
- Order: Coleoptera
- Suborder: Polyphaga
- Infraorder: Staphyliniformia
- Family: Staphylinidae
- Genus: Atheta
- Species: A. brunneipennis

Binomial name
- Atheta brunneipennis Thomson, 1852

= Atheta brunneipennis =

Species of beetle

Atheta brunneipennis is a species of rove beetles native to Europe.
