= Amischa =

Scientific classification
- Kingdom: Animalia
- Phylum: Arthropoda
- Clade: Pancrustacea
- Class: Insecta
- Order: Coleoptera
- Suborder: Polyphaga
- Infraorder: Staphyliniformia
- Family: Staphylinidae
- Subfamily: Aleocharinae
- Tribe: Athetini
- Genus: Amischa; Thomson, 1858

Genus of beetles

Amischa is a genus of beetles belonging to the family Staphylinidae.

The genus was described in 1858 by Carl Gustaf Thomson.

The genus has cosmopolitan distribution.

Species:

- Amischa analis
- Amischa bifoveolata
- Amischa decipiens
- Amischa nigrofusca
- Amischa paolettii Pace
