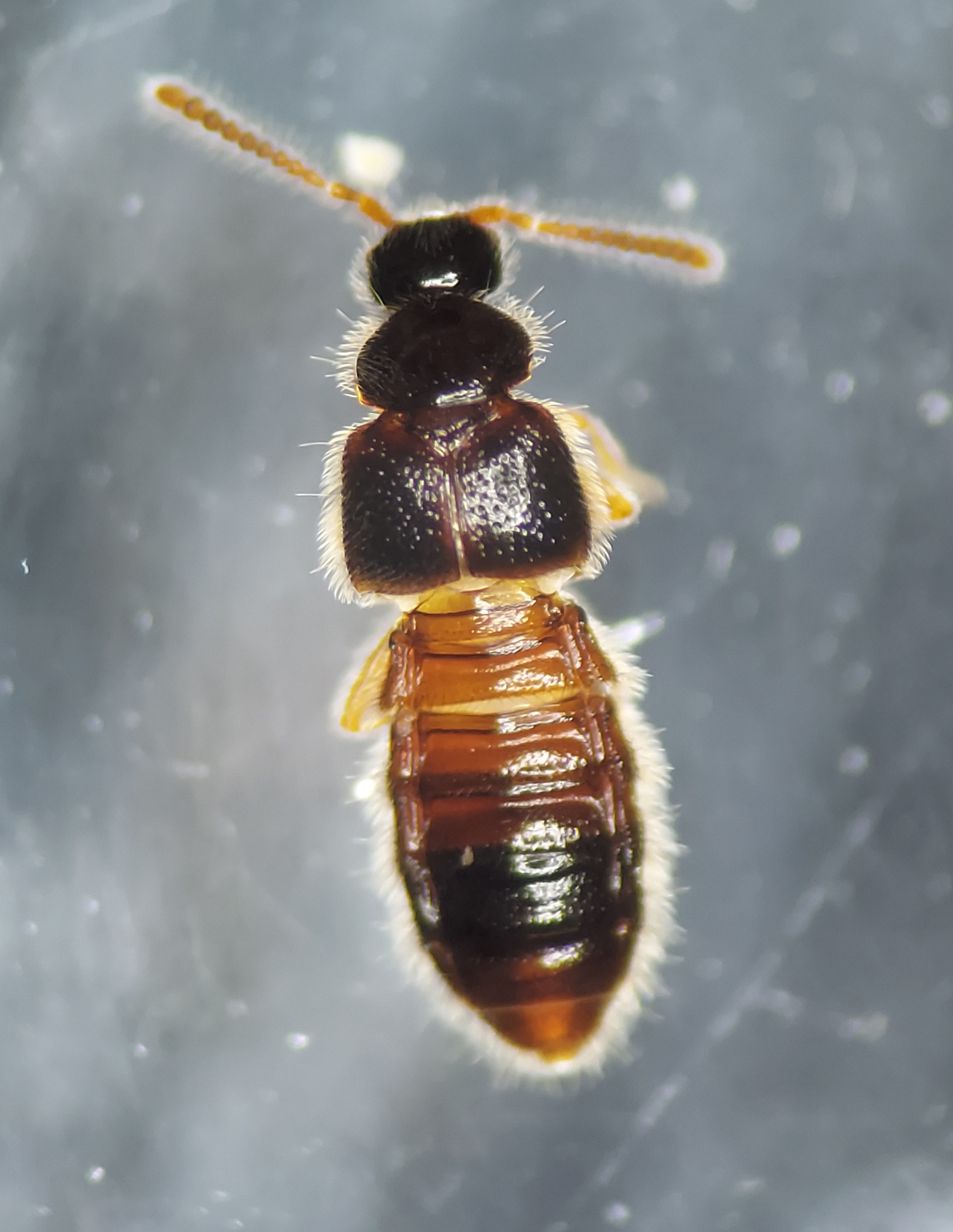
- Trichiusa, Virginia

Scientific classification
- Kingdom: Animalia
- Phylum: Arthropoda
- Class: Insecta
- Order: Coleoptera
- Suborder: Polyphaga
- Infraorder: Staphyliniformia
- Family: Staphylinidae
- Subfamily: Aleocharinae
- Tribe: Athetini
- Genus: Trichiusa; Casey, 1893

= Trichiusa =

Genus of beetles

Trichiusa is a genus of rove beetles in the family Staphylinidae. There are about 15 described species in Trichiusa, found in North America and Europe.

== Species ==
These 15 species belong to the genus Trichiusa:

- Trichiusa columbica Casey, 1911
- Trichiusa compacta Casey, 1893
- Trichiusa convergens Casey, 1906
- Trichiusa discreta Casey, 1906
- Trichiusa hirsuta Casey, 1906
- Trichiusa parvicollis Casey, 1893
- Trichiusa pilosa Casey, 1893
- Trichiusa polita Casey, 1906
- Trichiusa pseudopostica Klimaszewski & Langor, 2011
- Trichiusa rigida Casey, 1906
- Trichiusa robustula Casey, 1893
- Trichiusa setigera Casey, 1893
- Trichiusa ursina Notman, 1920
- Trichiusa varicolor Casey, 1906
- Trichiusa virginica Casey, 1906
