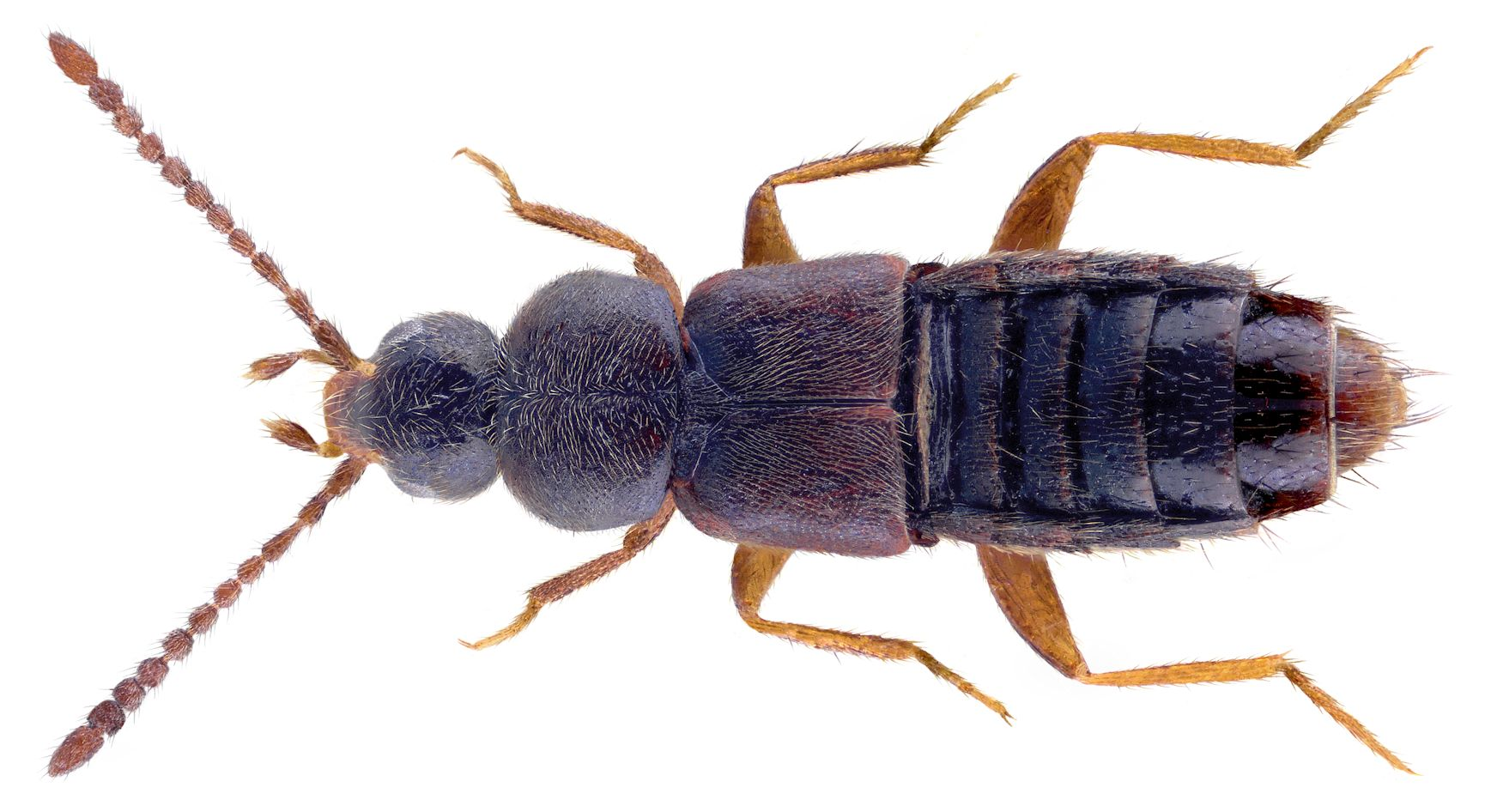
- Boreophilia eremita

Scientific classification
- Kingdom: Animalia
- Phylum: Arthropoda
- Class: Insecta
- Order: Coleoptera
- Suborder: Polyphaga
- Infraorder: Staphyliniformia
- Family: Staphylinidae
- Subfamily: Aleocharinae
- Tribe: Athetini
- Genus: Boreophilia; Benick, 1973

= Boreophilia =

Genus of beetles

Boreophilia is a genus of rove beetles in the family Staphylinidae. There are more than 20 described species in Boreophilia.

== Species ==
These 21 species belong to the genus Boreophilia:

- Boreophilia angusticornis (Bernhauer, 1907)
- Boreophilia beringi Klimaszewski & Brunke, 2019
- Boreophilia caseyi Lohse in Lohse, Klimaszewski and Smetana, 1990
- Boreophilia davidgei Klimaszewski & Godin, 2012
- Boreophilia eremita (Rye, 1866)
- Boreophilia fusca (C. Sahlberg, 1831)
- Boreophilia gelida (J. Sahlberg, 1887)
- Boreophilia hercynica (Renkonen, 1936)
- Boreophilia hyperborea (Brundin, 1940)
- Boreophilia insecuta (Eppelsheim, 1893)
- Boreophilia islandica (Kraatz, 1857)
- Boreophilia latifemorata (Brundin, 1940)
- Boreophilia manitobensis Lohse in Lohse, Klimaszewski and Smetana, 1990
- Boreophilia nearctica Lohse in Lohse, Klimaszewski and Smetana, 1990
- Boreophilia neoinsecuta Klimaszewski 2019
- Boreophilia nomensis (Casey, 1910)
- Boreophilia ovalis Klimaszewski & Langor, 2011
- Boreophilia piligera (J Sahlberg, 1876)
- Boreophilia subplana (J. Sahlberg, 1880)
- Boreophilia vega (Fenyes, 1920)
- Boreophilia venti (Lohse in Lohse, Klimaszewski and Smetana, 1990)
