= Liogluta =

Scientific classification
- Kingdom: Animalia
- Phylum: Arthropoda
- Class: Insecta
- Order: Coleoptera
- Suborder: Polyphaga
- Infraorder: Staphyliniformia
- Family: Staphylinidae
- Subfamily: Aleocharinae
- Tribe: Athetini
- Genus: Liogluta; Thomson, 1858

Genus of beetles

Liogluta is a genus of beetles belonging to the family Staphylinidae.

The species of this genus are found in Europe, Japan and North America.

Species:

- Liogluta abdominalis (Bernhauer, 1907)
- Liogluta akiana Assing, 2004
- Liogluta castoris Klimaszewski & Webster, 2016
- Liogluta falcata Assing, 2010
- Liogluta microgranulosa Klimaszewski & Webster, 2016
- Liogluta pseudocastoris Klimaszewski & Webster, 2016
