= Atheta esuriens =

Scientific classification
- Kingdom: Animalia
- Phylum: Arthropoda
- Class: Insecta
- Order: Coleoptera
- Suborder: Polyphaga
- Infraorder: Staphyliniformia
- Family: Staphylinidae
- Genus: Atheta
- Species: A. esuriens

Binomial name
- Atheta esuriens Assing, 2010

Species of beetle

Atheta esuriens is a species of rove beetle first found in Turkey.
