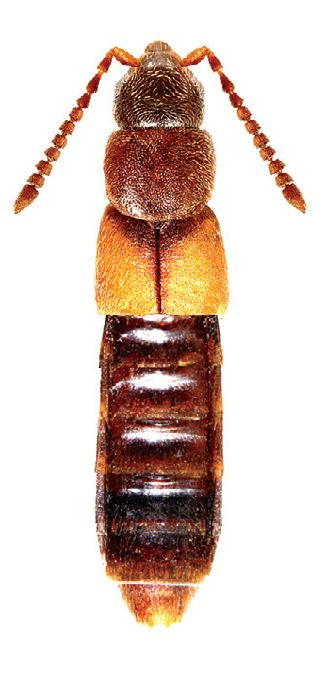
- Dinaraea Angustula

Scientific classification
- Kingdom: Animalia
- Phylum: Arthropoda
- Class: Insecta
- Order: Coleoptera
- Suborder: Polyphaga
- Infraorder: Staphyliniformia
- Family: Staphylinidae
- Genus: Dinaraea
- Species: D. angustula

Binomial name
- Dinaraea angustula (Gyllenhal, 1810)

= Dinaraea angustula =

Species of beetle

Dinaraea angustula is a species of rove beetle in the family Staphylinidae. It is found in Europe and Northern Asia (excluding China) and North America.
