= Tomoglossa =

Scientific classification
- Kingdom: Animalia
- Phylum: Arthropoda
- Clade: Pancrustacea
- Class: Insecta
- Order: Coleoptera
- Suborder: Polyphaga
- Infraorder: Staphyliniformia
- Family: Staphylinidae
- Tribe: Athetini
- Genus: Tomoglossa; Kraatz, 1856

Synonyms
- Noverota Casey, 1910

Genus of beetles

Tomoglossa is a genus of beetles belonging to the family Staphylinidae.

The genus was described in 1856 by Ernst Gustav Kraatz.

The species of this genus are found in Europe and North America.

Species:

- Tomoglossa aegyptiaca Scheerpeltz, 1963
- Tomoglossa arizonica Gusarov, 2002
- Tomoglossa decora (Casey, 1910)
