= Goniusa caseyi =

Scientific classification
- Kingdom: Animalia
- Phylum: Arthropoda
- Class: Insecta
- Order: Coleoptera
- Suborder: Polyphaga
- Infraorder: Staphyliniformia
- Family: Staphylinidae
- Genus: Goniusa
- Species: G. caseyi

Binomial name
- Goniusa caseyi Gusarov, 2003

Species of beetle

Goniusa caseyi is a species of rove beetle in the family Staphylinidae. It is found in North America.
