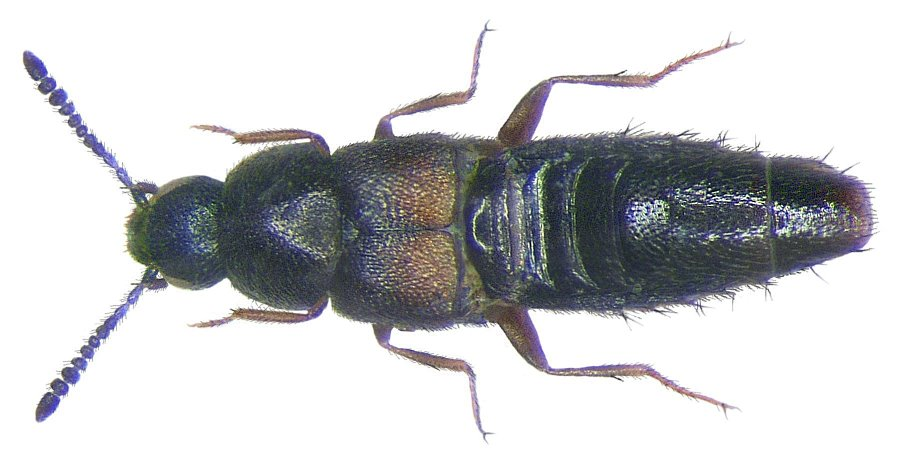
- Acrotona nigerrima

Scientific classification
- Kingdom: Animalia
- Phylum: Arthropoda
- Class: Insecta
- Order: Coleoptera
- Suborder: Polyphaga
- Infraorder: Staphyliniformia
- Family: Staphylinidae
- Tribe: Athetini
- Subtribe: Athetina
- Genus: Acrotona; Thomson, 1859

= Acrotona =

Genus of beetles

Acrotona is a genus of rove beetles in the family Staphylinidae. There are at least 30 described species in Acrotona.

== Species ==
- Acrotona absona Casey, 1910
- Acrotona acutella Casey, 1910
- Acrotona assecla (Casey, 1910)
- Acrotona austiniana (Casey, 1910)
- Acrotona cupiens (Casey, 1910)
- Acrotona curata (Casey, 1910)
- Acrotona dilutipennis (Motschulsky, 1858)
- Acrotona discreta (Casey, 1893)
- Acrotona egens Casey, 1910
- Acrotona egregiella (Casey, 1910)
- Acrotona fatigans (Casey, 1910)
- Acrotona fontinalis (Casey, 1910)
- Acrotona hebeticornis Notman, 1920
- Acrotona luteola (Erichson, 1839)
- Acrotona obliquata (Casey, 1910)
- Acrotona onthophila Lohse in Lohse, Klimaszewski and Smetana, 1990
- Acrotona opica (Casey, 1911)
- Acrotona pasadenae (Bernhauer, 1906)
- Acrotona petulans (Casey, 1910)
- Acrotona picescens Notman, 1920
- Acrotona reclusa (Casey, 1910)
- Acrotona recondita (Erichson, 1839)
- Acrotona scopula (Casey, 1893)
- Acrotona smithi (Casey, 1910)
- Acrotona sonomana (Casey, 1910)
- Acrotona subpygmaea (Bernhauer, 1909)
- Acrotona trossula (Casey, 1910)
- Acrotona turbans (Casey, 1910)
- Acrotona vafra (Casey, 1910)
- Acrotona zephyrina (Casey, 1910)
