= Atheta pilicornis =

Scientific classification
- Kingdom: Animalia
- Phylum: Arthropoda
- Clade: Pancrustacea
- Class: Insecta
- Order: Coleoptera
- Suborder: Polyphaga
- Infraorder: Staphyliniformia
- Family: Staphylinidae
- Genus: Atheta
- Species: A. pilicornis

Binomial name
- Atheta pilicornis (Thomson, 1852)

Species of beetle

Atheta pilicornis is a species of beetles belonging to the family Staphylinidae.

It is native to Europe. Adults of this species have been found on Armillaria borealis mushrooms.
