= Pontomalota =

Scientific classification
- Kingdom: Animalia
- Phylum: Arthropoda
- Class: Insecta
- Order: Coleoptera
- Suborder: Polyphaga
- Infraorder: Staphyliniformia
- Family: Staphylinidae
- Tribe: Athetini
- Genus: Pontomalota; Casey, 1885

Genus of beetles

Pontomalota is a genus of "sea shore genera" in the beetle family Staphylinidae. There are at least two described species in Pontomalota.

== Species ==
These two species belong to the genus Pontomalota:

- Pontomalota opaca (LeConte, 1863)
- Pontomalota terminalia Ahn & Ashe, 1992
