= Tarphiota fucicola =

Scientific classification
- Kingdom: Animalia
- Phylum: Arthropoda
- Class: Insecta
- Order: Coleoptera
- Suborder: Polyphaga
- Infraorder: Staphyliniformia
- Family: Staphylinidae
- Genus: Tarphiota
- Species: T. fucicola

Binomial name
- Tarphiota fucicola (Mäklin in Mannerheim, 1852)

Species of beetle

Tarphiota fucicola is a species of "sea shore genus" in the beetle family Staphylinidae. It is found in North America.
