= Atheta pennsylvanica =

Scientific classification
- Kingdom: Animalia
- Phylum: Arthropoda
- Class: Insecta
- Order: Coleoptera
- Suborder: Polyphaga
- Infraorder: Staphyliniformia
- Family: Staphylinidae
- Genus: Atheta
- Species: A. pennsylvanica

Binomial name
- Atheta pennsylvanica Bernhauer, 1907

Species of beetle

Atheta pennsylvanica is a species of rove beetle in the family Staphylinidae. It is found in North America.
