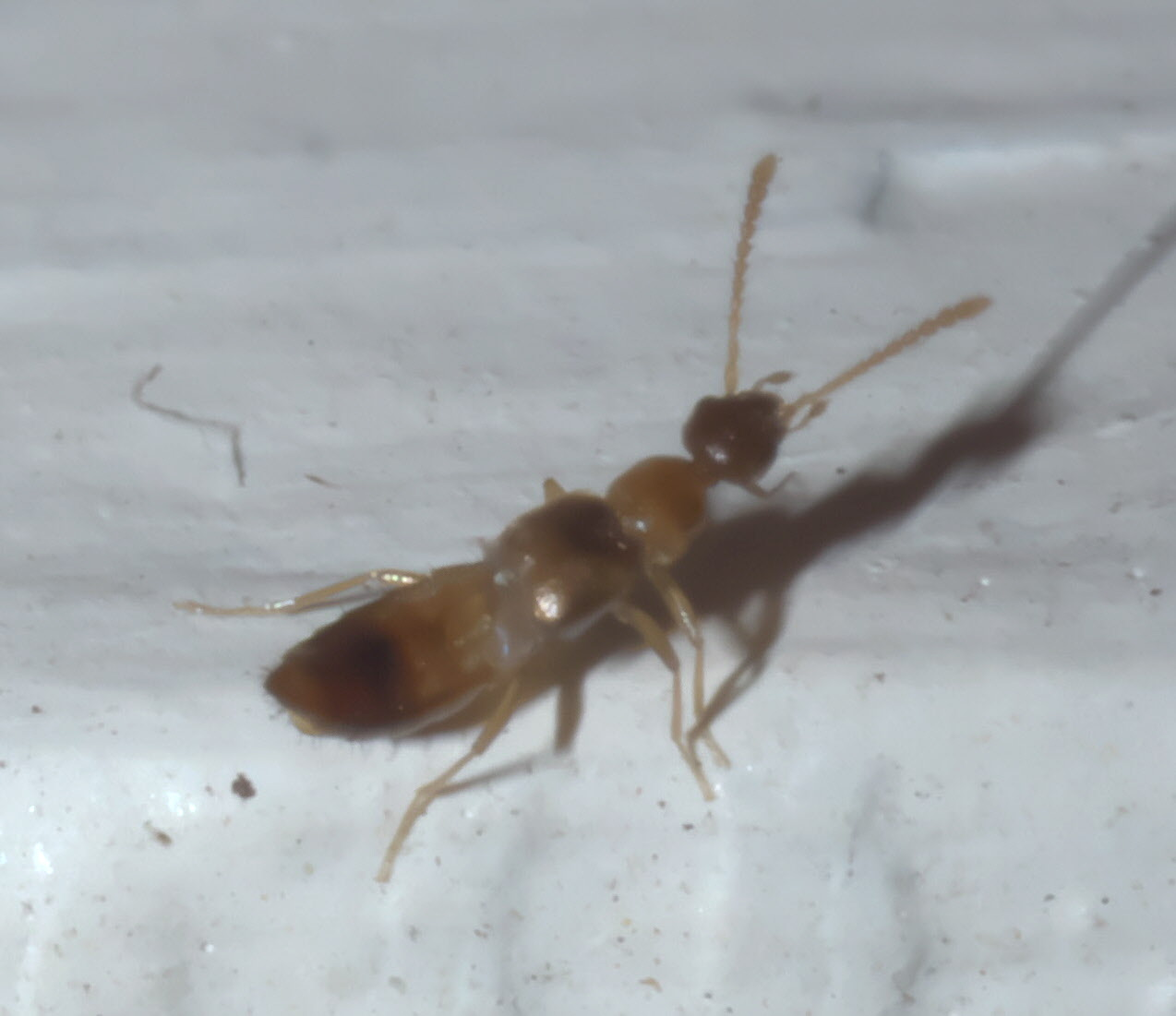

Scientific classification
- Kingdom: Animalia
- Phylum: Arthropoda
- Class: Insecta
- Order: Coleoptera
- Suborder: Polyphaga
- Infraorder: Staphyliniformia
- Family: Staphylinidae
- Genus: Meronera
- Species: M. venustula

Binomial name
- Meronera venustula (Erichson, 1839)

= Meronera venustula =

Species of beetle

Meronera venustula is a species of rove beetle in the family Staphylinidae. It is found in North America.

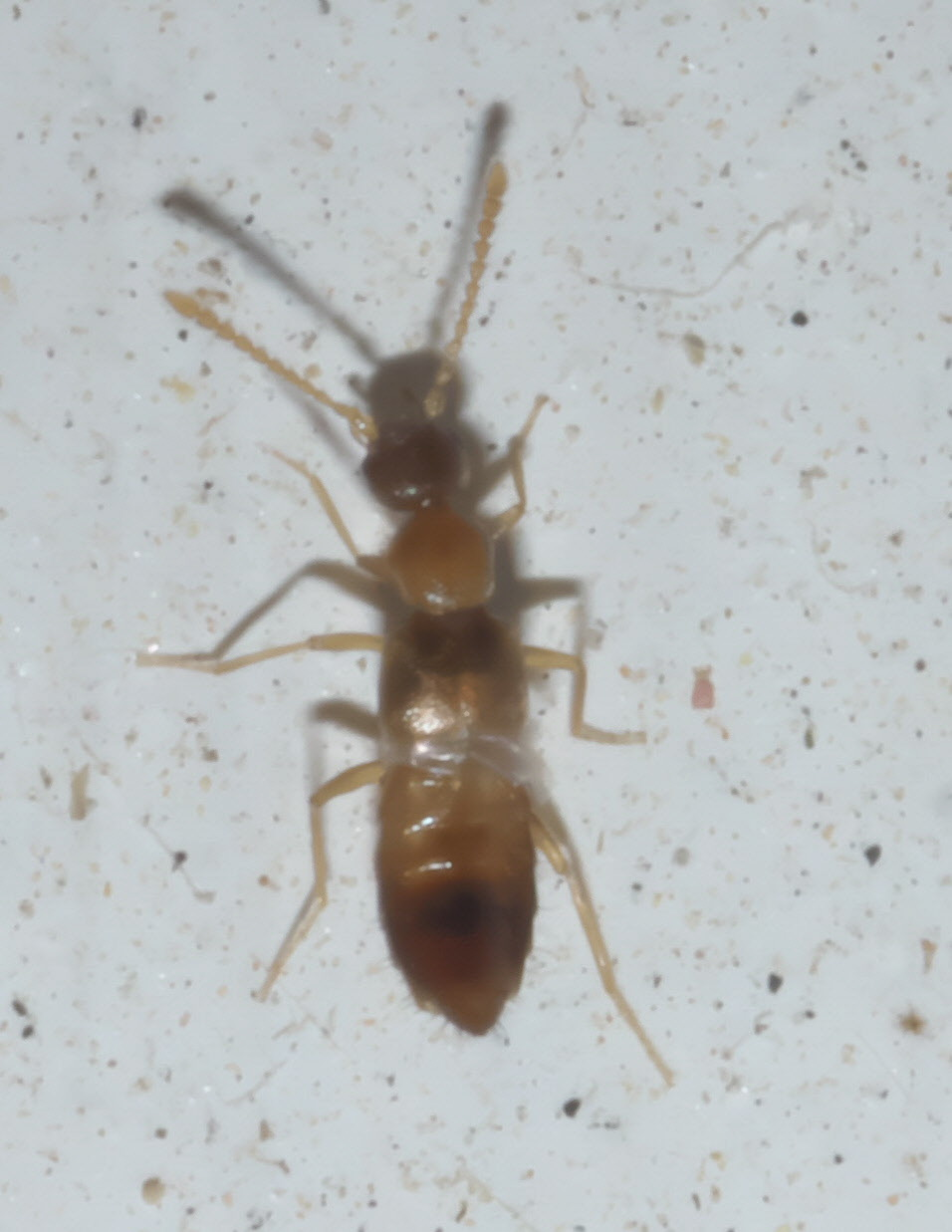
