= Atheta ventricosa =

Scientific classification
- Kingdom: Animalia
- Phylum: Arthropoda
- Class: Insecta
- Order: Coleoptera
- Suborder: Polyphaga
- Infraorder: Staphyliniformia
- Family: Staphylinidae
- Genus: Atheta
- Species: A. ventricosa

Binomial name
- Atheta ventricosa Bernhauer, 1907

Species of beetle

Atheta ventricosa is a species of rove beetle in the family Staphylinidae. It is found in North America.
