= Pontomalota opaca =

Scientific classification
- Kingdom: Animalia
- Phylum: Arthropoda
- Class: Insecta
- Order: Coleoptera
- Suborder: Polyphaga
- Infraorder: Staphyliniformia
- Family: Staphylinidae
- Genus: Pontomalota
- Species: P. opaca

Binomial name
- Pontomalota opaca (LeConte, 1863)

Synonyms
- Phytosus opacus LeConte, 1863; Pontomalota bakeri Bernhauer in Baker, 1912; Pontomalota californica Casey, 1885; Pontomalota luctuosa Casey, 1911; Pontomalota nigriceps Casey, 1885

Species of beetle

Pontomalota opaca is a species of "sea shore genus" in the beetle family Staphylinidae. It is found in North America.
