= Thinusa =

Scientific classification
- Kingdom: Animalia
- Phylum: Arthropoda
- Class: Insecta
- Order: Coleoptera
- Suborder: Polyphaga
- Infraorder: Staphyliniformia
- Family: Staphylinidae
- Tribe: Athetini
- Genus: Thinusa; Casey, 1893

Genus of beetles

Thinusa is a genus of "sea shore genera" in the beetle family Staphylinidae. There are at least two described species in Thinusa.

== Species ==
These two species belong to the genus Thinusa:

- Thinusa fletcheri Casey, 1906
- Thinusa maritima (Casey, 1885)
