= Tarphiota =

Scientific classification
- Kingdom: Animalia
- Phylum: Arthropoda
- Class: Insecta
- Order: Coleoptera
- Suborder: Polyphaga
- Infraorder: Staphyliniformia
- Family: Staphylinidae
- Tribe: Athetini
- Genus: Tarphiota; Casey, 1893

Genus of beetles

Tarphiota is a genus in the family of beetles known as Staphylinidae. There are at least three described species in Tarphiota. Members of this genus are found on seashores, in association with decaying seaweed.

== Species ==
These three species belong to the genus Tarphiota:

- Tarphiota densa (Moore, 1978)^{i c g}
- Tarphiota fucicola (Mäklin in Mannerheim, 1852)^{i c g b}
- Tarphiota geniculata (Mäklin in Mannerheim, 1852)^{i c g b}

Data sources: i = ITIS, c = Catalogue of Life, g = GBIF, b = Bugguide.net
