= Mocyta =

Scientific classification
- Kingdom: Animalia
- Phylum: Arthropoda
- Class: Insecta
- Order: Coleoptera
- Suborder: Polyphaga
- Infraorder: Staphyliniformia
- Family: Staphylinidae
- Genus: Mocyta; Mulsant & Rey, 1874

Genus of beetles

Mocyta is a genus of beetles belonging to the family Staphylinidae.

The species of this genus are found in Europe and Northern America.

Species:

- Mocyta amblystegii (Brundin, 1952)
- Mocyta amplicollis (Mulsant & Rey, 1873)
