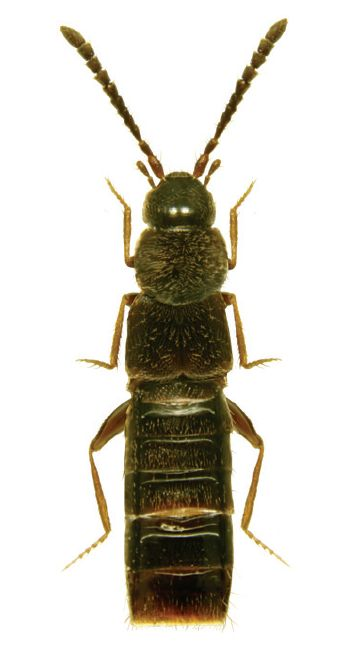

Scientific classification
- Kingdom: Animalia
- Phylum: Arthropoda
- Clade: Pancrustacea
- Class: Insecta
- Order: Coleoptera
- Suborder: Polyphaga
- Infraorder: Staphyliniformia
- Family: Staphylinidae
- Genus: Schistoglossa; Kraatz, 1856

= Schistoglossa =

Genus of beetles

Schistoglossa is a genus of beetles belonging to the family Staphylinidae.

The species of this genus are found in Europe and North America.

Species:

- Schistoglossa approximata (Bernhauer, 1909)
- Schistoglossa aubei (Brisout de Barneville, 1860)
