= Alevonota =

Scientific classification
- Kingdom: Animalia
- Phylum: Arthropoda
- Class: Insecta
- Order: Coleoptera
- Suborder: Polyphaga
- Infraorder: Staphyliniformia
- Family: Staphylinidae
- Genus: Alevonota; Thomson, 1858

Genus of beetles

Alevonota is a genus of beetle belonging to the family Staphylinidae.

The genus was first described by Carl Gustaf Thomson in 1858.

The genus has almost cosmopolitan distribution.

Species:

- Alevonota cretica (Assing & Wunderle, 2008) - Crete
- Alevonota flexa (Assing, 2017)
- Alevonota rufotestacea (Kraatz, 1856)
