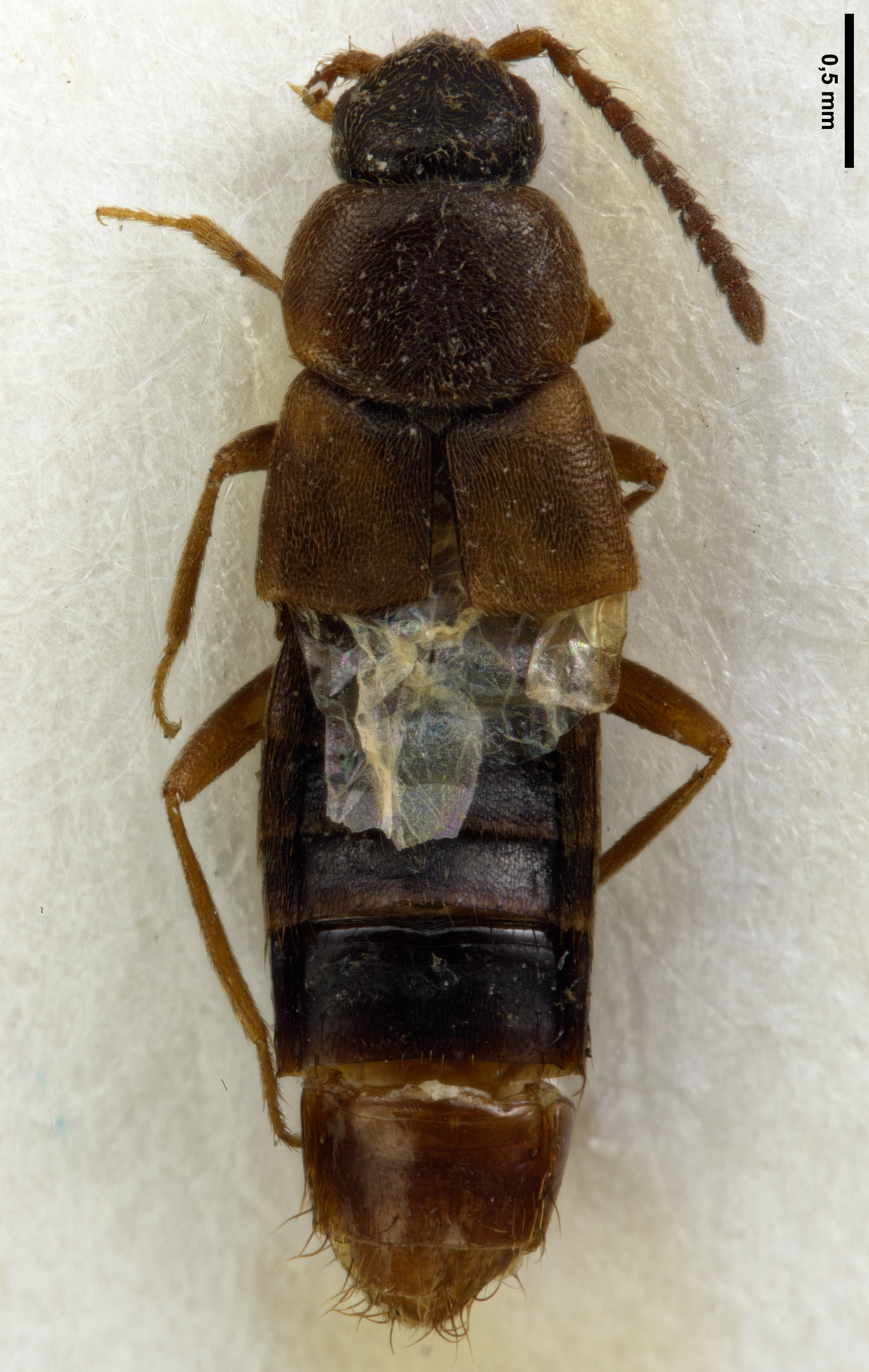
- Lypoglossa angularis

Scientific classification
- Kingdom: Animalia
- Phylum: Arthropoda
- Clade: Pancrustacea
- Class: Insecta
- Order: Coleoptera
- Suborder: Polyphaga
- Infraorder: Staphyliniformia
- Family: Staphylinidae
- Subfamily: Aleocharinae
- Genus: Lypoglossa; Fenyes, 1918

= Lypoglossa =

Genus of beetles

Lypoglossa is a genus of rove beetle in the subfamily Aleocharinae. Four species are known:

- Lypoglossa angularis (Mäklin, 1853) - Nearctic
- Lypoglossa franclemonti Hoebeke, 1992 - Nearctic
- Lypoglossa manitobae Gusarov, 2004 - (Canada)
- Lypoglossa lateralis (Mannerheim, 1830) -, Europe
