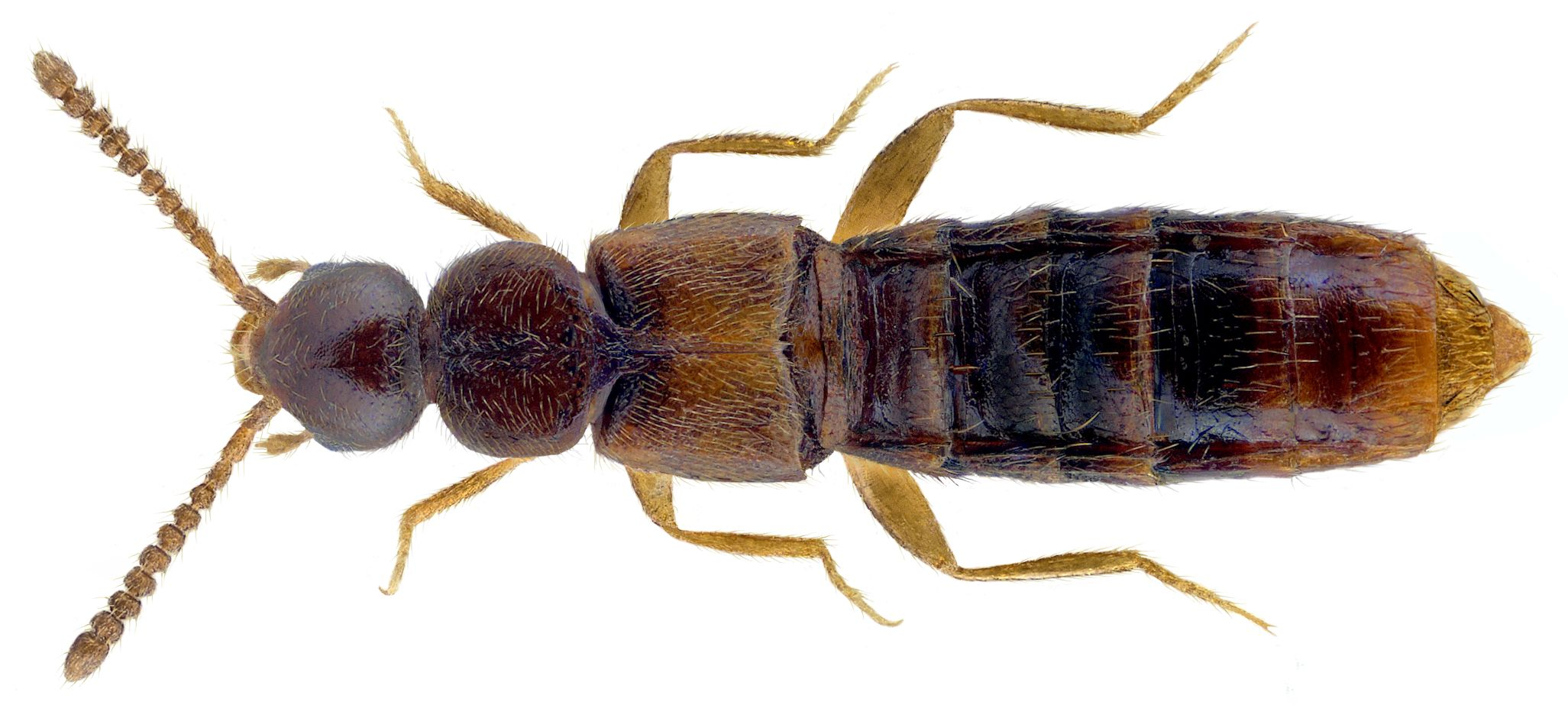
- Amidobia talpa (Heer, 1841)

Scientific classification
- Kingdom: Animalia
- Phylum: Arthropoda
- Clade: Pancrustacea
- Class: Insecta
- Order: Coleoptera
- Suborder: Polyphaga
- Infraorder: Staphyliniformia
- Family: Staphylinidae
- Genus: Amidobia; Thomson, 1858

= Amidobia =

Genus of beetles

Amidobia is a genus of beetles belonging to the family Staphylinidae.

The species of this genus are found in Europe.

GBIF recognizes nine species, including:

- Amidobia bacilliformis (Bernhauer, 1921)
- Amidobia creta Pace, 1985
