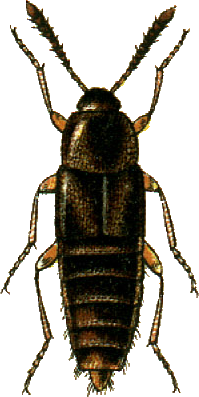
- Nehemitropia lividipennis

Scientific classification
- Kingdom: Animalia
- Phylum: Arthropoda
- Class: Insecta
- Order: Coleoptera
- Suborder: Polyphaga
- Infraorder: Staphyliniformia
- Family: Staphylinidae
- Subtribe: Athetina
- Genus: Nehemitropia; Lohse, 1971

= Nehemitropia =

Genus of beetles

Nehemitropia is a genus of rove beetles in the family Staphylinidae. There are at least two described species in Nehemitropia.

== Species ==
These two species belong to the genus Nehemitropia:

- Nehemitropia lividipennis (Mannerheim, 1830)
- Nehemitropia taiwanorum Pace, 2009
