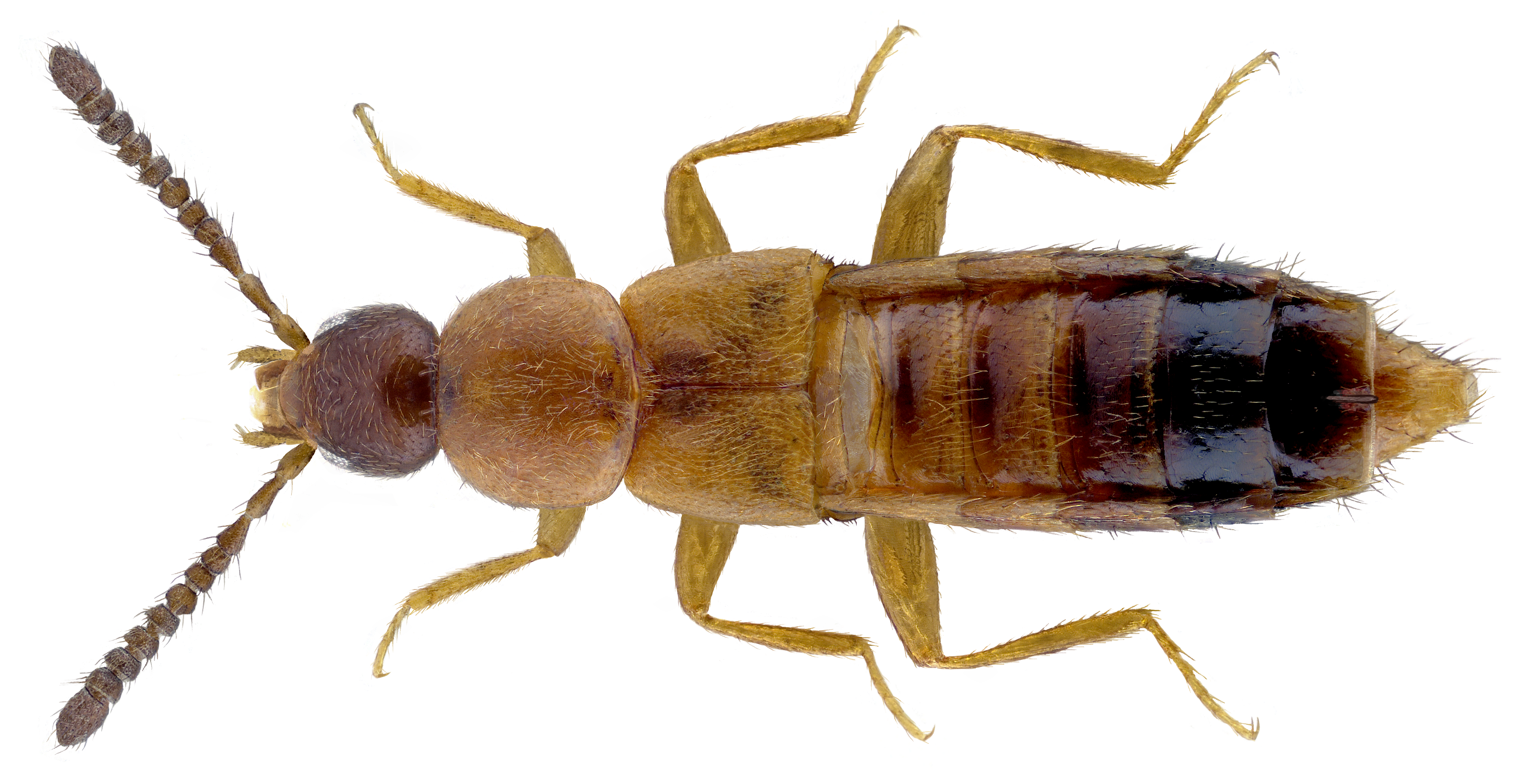
- Geostiba circellaris

Scientific classification
- Kingdom: Animalia
- Phylum: Arthropoda
- Clade: Pancrustacea
- Class: Insecta
- Order: Coleoptera
- Suborder: Polyphaga
- Infraorder: Staphyliniformia
- Family: Staphylinidae
- Genus: Geostiba; Thomson, 1858

= Geostiba =

Genus of beetles

Geostiba is a genus of beetles belonging to the family Staphylinidae.

The species of this genus are found in Europe, Australia and North America.

Species:

- Geostiba acifera Assing, 1999
- Geostiba aculeata (Coiffait, 1968)
- Geostiba ahaiaensis Assing, 1999
- Geostiba albacetensis Pace, 1983
- Geostiba alexandri Pace, 1977
- Geostiba amplicollis Pace, 1988
- Geostiba andalusa Pace, 2002
- Geostiba angelinii Pace, 2002
- Geostiba anxanensis Pace, 1977
- Geostiba apfelbecki Eppelsheim, 1892
- Geostiba appuana (Bernhauer, 1940)
- Geostiba araneaensis Pace, 1990
- Geostiba arazeccana (Bernhauer, 1909)
- Geostiba arida (Eppelsheim, 1881)
- Geostiba arieiroensis Assing & Wunderle, 1996
- Geostiba armata (Eppelsheim, 1878)
- Geostiba armicollis (Breit, 1917)
- Geostiba arundensis Pace, 1990
- Geostiba aspromontana Pace, 1977
- Geostiba asturiensis (Fagel, 1967)
- Geostiba australiae (Cameron, 1943)
- Geostiba baetica Pace, 1983
- Geostiba barcinonensis Pace, 1983
- Geostiba behnei Zerche, 2002
- Geostiba beieri (Scheerpeltz, 1959)
- Geostiba belasizaensis Zerche, 2002
- Geostiba bermejensis Pace, 2002
- Geostiba bernhaueri (Breit, 1912)
- Geostiba beroni (Coiffait, 1968)
- Geostiba besila Pace, 1996
- Geostiba besucheti (Fagel, 1961)
- Geostiba bicacanaensis Assing & Wunderle, 1996
- Geostiba bidens (Baudi, 1869)
- Geostiba biharica Pace, 1990
- Geostiba biokovensis Pace, 1990
- Geostiba brancomontis Assing & Wunderle, 1996
- Geostiba breviuter Assing, 2000
- Geostiba brigantii Pace, 1988
- Geostiba bulbifera Zerche, 1988
- Geostiba bulgarica Pace, 1983
- Geostiba cabrerensis Assing, 2003
- Geostiba calabra Pace, 1974
- Geostiba caligicola Assing & Wunderle, 1996
- Geostiba calva Pace, 1977
- Geostiba carinthiaca (Scheerpeltz, 1957)
- Geostiba cassagnaui (Coiffait, 1968)
- Geostiba catalanica (Scheerpeltz, 1961)
- Geostiba cavipennis (Mulsant & Rey, 1875)
- Geostiba cazorlensis (Fagel, 1961)
- Geostiba cerrutii Pace, 1977
- Geostiba chlorotica (Fairmaire, 1859)
- Geostiba circaea Pace, 1977
- Geostiba cirocchii Pace, 2002
- Geostiba coiffaiti Pace, 1983
- Geostiba coiffaitiana Pace, 1990
- Geostiba comellinii Pace, 1983
- Geostiba commingensis Pace, 1990
- Geostiba conifera Fauvel, 1900
- Geostiba consobrina Assing, 2003
- Geostiba cosentina Pace, 1977
- Geostiba couflesensis Pace, 1990
- Geostiba covadongensis (Fagel, 1967)
- Geostiba cribripennis Pace, 1990
- Geostiba croatica (Eppelsheim, 1880)
- Geostiba cryptophthalma (Scheerpeltz, 1951)
- Geostiba curtipennis (Aubé, 1863)
- Geostiba curzolae (Bernhauer, 1931)
- Geostiba cyprensis Pace, 1993
- Geostiba deubeli (Bernhauer, 1909)
- Geostiba diversiventris (Bernhauer, 1909)
- Geostiba doderoana (Roubal, 1912)
- Geostiba douradasensis Pace, 1983
- Geostiba ehlersi (Eppelsheim, 1884)
- Geostiba endogea Assing & Wunderle, 1996
- Geostiba ensifera (Ganglbauer, 1895)
- Geostiba ericicola Assing, 1997
- Geostiba euboica Pace, 1990
- Geostiba excaecata Assing, 2001
- Geostiba exsecta Assing, 1999
- Geostiba falakroensis Assing, 1999
- Geostiba feldmanni Assing, 2003
- Geostiba filiformis (Wollaston, 1854)
- Geostiba flava (Kraatz, 1856)
- Geostiba florentina Pace, 1977
- Geostiba focarilei (Scheerpeltz, 1956)
- Geostiba formicarum (Wollaston, 1854)
- Geostiba fretoria (Fagel, 1961)
- Geostiba fthiotisensis Assing, 1999
- Geostiba furcifera Fauvel, 1900
- Geostiba fuscula (Ganglbauer, 1895)
- Geostiba gadesensis Pace, 1990
- Geostiba gaditana (Fagel, 1961)
- Geostiba galicicana Assing, 2000
- Geostiba gardensis Pace, 1990
- Geostiba gardinii Pace, 1988
- Geostiba garganica Pace, 2002
- Geostiba gerundensis Pace, 2002
- Geostiba glacialis (Brisout, 1967)
- Geostiba graminicola Assing & Wunderle, 1996
- Geostiba granollersensis Pace, 2002
- Geostiba gyorffyi (Bernhauer, 1929)
- Geostiba hachoensis Assing, 2003
- Geostiba heraultensis Pace, 1990
- Geostiba hernica Pace, 1977
- Geostiba hervei Pace, 1990
- Geostiba hickeri (Scheerpeltz, 1963)
- Geostiba hispalensis Pace, 1990
- Geostiba hummleri (Bernhauer, 1931)
- Geostiba icaria Pace, 1996
- Geostiba idaea Pace, 1996
- Geostiba ilievi Zerche, 2002
- Geostiba impressa (Mulsant & Rey, 1875)
- Geostiba incisa (Peyerimhoff, 1900)
- Geostiba infirma (Weise, 1878)
- Geostiba insularis (Bernhauer, 1909)
- Geostiba ionica Pace, 1977
- Geostiba italica Pace, 1988
- Geostiba itiensis Assing, 1999
- Geostiba jarasteparensis Pace, 2002
- Geostiba josephi Pace, 1977
- Geostiba kasyi (Scheerpeltz, 1959)
- Geostiba killiniensis Assing, 1999
- Geostiba korbi (Eppelsheim, 1889)
- Geostiba krapinensis Pace, 1990
- Geostiba laevata (Mulsant & Rey, 1875)
- Geostiba laevigata (Brisout, 1866)
- Geostiba lagrecai Pace, 1979
- Geostiba lanzarotensis (Palm, 1975)
- Geostiba lapurdensis Pace, 1990
- Geostiba laticornis (Fauvel, 1890)
- Geostiba lauricola Assing & Wunderle, 1996
- Geostiba lavagnei Peyerimhoff, 1917
- Geostiba leonhardi (Bernhauer, 1908)
- Geostiba lepinensis Pace, 1977
- Geostiba leridensis Pace, 1990
- Geostiba leucadiae (Scheerpeltz, 1931)
- Geostiba ligurica Pace, 1988
- Geostiba lindrothi Franz, 1981
- Geostiba linearis (Brisout, 1867)
- Geostiba linkei (Bernhauer, 1940)
- Geostiba lonai (Scheerpeltz, 1957)
- Geostiba longicollis Fauvel, 1900
- Geostiba lozerensis Pace, 1990
- Geostiba lucana Pace, 2002
- Geostiba lucens (Benick, 1970)
- Geostiba luigionii Bernhauer, 1899
- Geostiba maderi Pace, 1996
- Geostiba magistrettii (Scheerpeltz, 1958)
- Geostiba magrinii Pace, 1996
- Geostiba maritima Pace, 1990
- Geostiba maroneiensis Pace, 1979
- Geostiba matajurensis (Scheerpeltz, 1957)
- Geostiba matsakisi (Coiffait, 1968)
- Geostiba meixneri (Bernhauer, 1910)
- Geostiba melanocephala (Crotch, 1876)
- Geostiba melitensis Pace, 1999
- Geostiba menalonensis Assing, 1999
- Geostiba mendax Pace, 1977
- Geostiba menikioensis Assing, 1999
- Geostiba menozzii Pace, 1988
- Geostiba meschniggi Pace, 1996
- Geostiba meschniggiana (Bernhauer, 1936)
- Geostiba meybohmi Assing, 2000
- Geostiba mihoki (Bernhauer, 1931)
- Geostiba moczarskii (Scheerpeltz, 1951)
- Geostiba molitgensis Pace, 2002
- Geostiba monogranulata Pace, 1990
- Geostiba montivaga (Brisout, 1863)
- Geostiba moreli (Bernhauer, 1898)
- Geostiba mostarensis Pace, 2002
- Geostiba muscicola (Wollaston, 1864)
- Geostiba myops (Kiesenwetter, 1850)
- Geostiba nebrodensis Pace, 1979
- Geostiba nitida (Fauvel, 1871)
- Geostiba nivicola (Fairmaire & Laboulbène, 1854)
- Geostiba noctis Assing, 1997
- Geostiba numantensis Pace, 1983
- Geostiba obtusicollis Assing, 2000
- Geostiba occulta Assing & Wunderle, 1996
- Geostiba oertzeni (Eppelsheim, 1888)
- Geostiba optima Pace, 1983
- Geostiba orhyensis Pace, 1990
- Geostiba osellai Pace, 1977
- Geostiba ossalensis Pace, 1990
- Geostiba ossogovskaensis Zerche, 2002
- Geostiba othrisensis Assing, 2001
- Geostiba pacei Zerche, 1988
- Geostiba padana (Weise, 1878)
- Geostiba paganettiana (Bernhauer, 1936)
- Geostiba pandellei (Brisout, 1867)
- Geostiba pangeoensis Assing, 1999
- Geostiba panormitana Pace, 1979
- Geostiba paracoiffaitiana Pace, 1990
- Geostiba parnoniensis Assing, 1999
- Geostiba pauli Assing, 1999
- Geostiba picena Pace, 1977
- Geostiba plicatella (Fauvel, 1878)
- Geostiba pluricarinata Pace, 2002
- Geostiba poggii Pace, 1988
- Geostiba portosantoi Franz, 1981
- Geostiba portuscomtensis Tronquet, 2000
- Geostiba pulchella (Baudi, 1869)
- Geostiba quadrisignata Pace, 1990
- Geostiba revelieri (Mulsant & Rey, 1875)
- Geostiba rhilensis (Rambousek, 1924)
- Geostiba rhodiensis Pace, 1993
- Geostiba rhunensis Fauvel, 1900
- Geostiba rodopensis Pace, 1990
- Geostiba romana (Bernhauer, 1909)
- Geostiba rossii Pace, 1977
- Geostiba rugosipennis (Scriba, 1867)
- Geostiba ruivomontis Assing & Wunderle, 1996
- Geostiba sacra Pace, 1977
- Geostiba salatensis Pace, 1990
- Geostiba samai Pace, 1977
- Geostiba samnitica Pace, 1977
- Geostiba sardoa Pace, 1988
- Geostiba schneideri (Bernhauer, 1940)
- Geostiba schuelkei Assing, 1999
- Geostiba sculpticollis (Apfelbeck, 1907)
- Geostiba segurensis Pace, 1990
- Geostiba sibyllinica Pace, 2002
- Geostiba siciliana Pace, 1979
- Geostiba siculifera Assing, 1999
- Geostiba simbruinica Pace, 1977
- Geostiba skalitzkyi (Oliveira, 1893)
- Geostiba slaviankaensis Zerche, 2002
- Geostiba solarii (Bernhauer, 1902)
- Geostiba solifuga (Ganglbauer, 1895)
- Geostiba spinicollis (Kraatz, 1862)
- Geostiba spizzana (Bernhauer, 1931)
- Geostiba straneoi (Bernhauer, 1940)
- Geostiba stussineri (Bernhauer, 1914)
- Geostiba subasiensis Pace, 2002
- Geostiba subcarinulata (Bernhauer, 1909)
- Geostiba sublaevis (Mulsant & Rey, 1875)
- Geostiba subterranea Assing & Wunderle, 1996
- Geostiba tamaninii (Scheerpeltz, 1956)
- Geostiba tarifensis Pace, 2002
- Geostiba taygetana (Bernhauer, 1936)
- Geostiba temeris Assing, 1997
- Geostiba tenebrarum Assing, 1997
- Geostiba tenenbaumi (Bernhauer, 1940)
- Geostiba tergestina Pace, 1988
- Geostiba thermarum Fauvel, 1900
- Geostiba thryptisensis Assing, 2001
- Geostiba torisuturalis Assing, 2000
- Geostiba tronqueti Pace, 2002
- Geostiba turcica (Bernhauer, 1900)
- Geostiba turrensis Pace, 1990
- Geostiba tyrrhenica Pace, 1977
- Geostiba ulcerifera Assing, 1999
- Geostiba unituberculata Assing, 2003
- Geostiba vaccinicola Assing & Wunderle, 1996
- Geostiba valentiana Pace, 1990
- Geostiba vallierensis Pace, 1990
- Geostiba varensis Pace, 2002
- Geostiba vascona Pace, 1996
- Geostiba veneta Pace, 1977
- Geostiba ventosa Pace, 1996
- Geostiba vermionensis Assing, 1999
- Geostiba vidua Pace, 1983
- Geostiba vivesi (Coiffait, 1976)
- Geostiba weiratheri Pace, 1984
- Geostiba winkleriana Pace, 1996
- Geostiba wunderlei Pace, 1996
- Geostiba xerovuniana (Scheerpeltz, 1959)
- Geostiba zeithammeri (Bernhauer, 1940)
- Geostiba zercheana Assing, 1999
- Geostiba zoufali (Rambousek, 1915)
