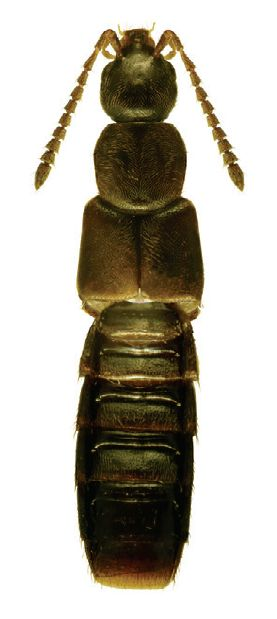
- Aloconota

Scientific classification
- Kingdom: Animalia
- Phylum: Arthropoda
- Class: Insecta
- Order: Coleoptera
- Suborder: Polyphaga
- Infraorder: Staphyliniformia
- Family: Staphylinidae
- Genus: Aloconota; Thomson, 1858

Extant species
- See text

Synonyms
- Disopora Thomson, 1859

= Aloconota =

Genus of beetles

Aloconota is a genus of beetles belonging to the family Staphylinidae.

The genus was described in 1858 by Carl Gustaf Thomson.

The genus has cosmopolitan distribution.

Species:

- Aloconota currax
- Aloconota debilicornis
- Aloconota gregaria
- Aloconota insecta
- Aloconota planifrons
- Aloconota sulcifrons
