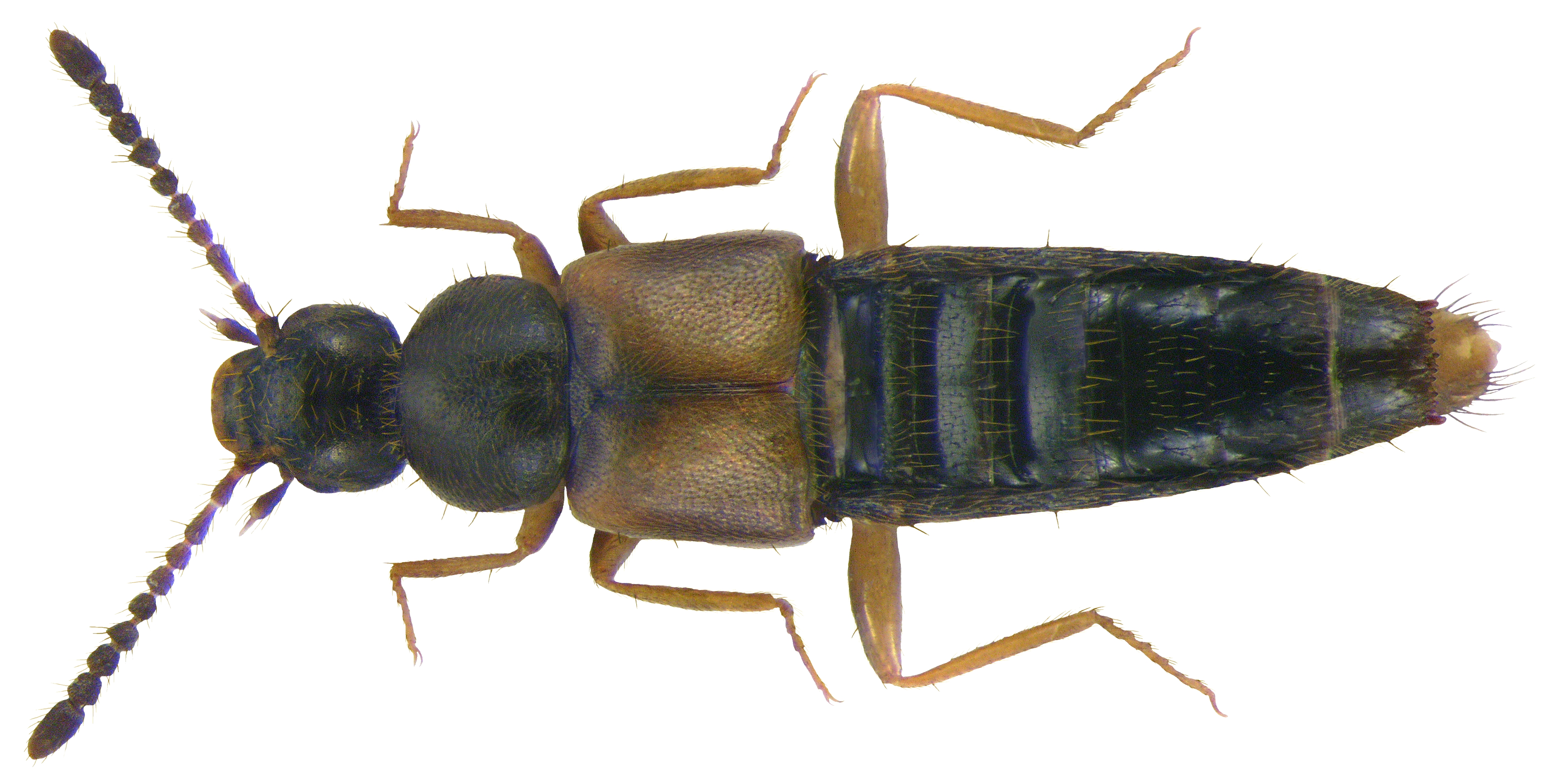
- Atheta aeneicollis

Scientific classification
- Kingdom: Animalia
- Phylum: Arthropoda
- Class: Insecta
- Order: Coleoptera
- Suborder: Polyphaga
- Infraorder: Staphyliniformia
- Family: Staphylinidae
- Subtribe: Athetina
- Genus: Atheta; Thomson, 1858

Diversity
- at least 440 species

Synonyms
- Iotota Casey, 1910; Anopleta Mulsant & Rey, 1875; Cadaverota Yosii & Sawada, 1976; Coprothassa Thomson, 1859; Bessobia Thomson, 1858

= Atheta =

Genus of beetles

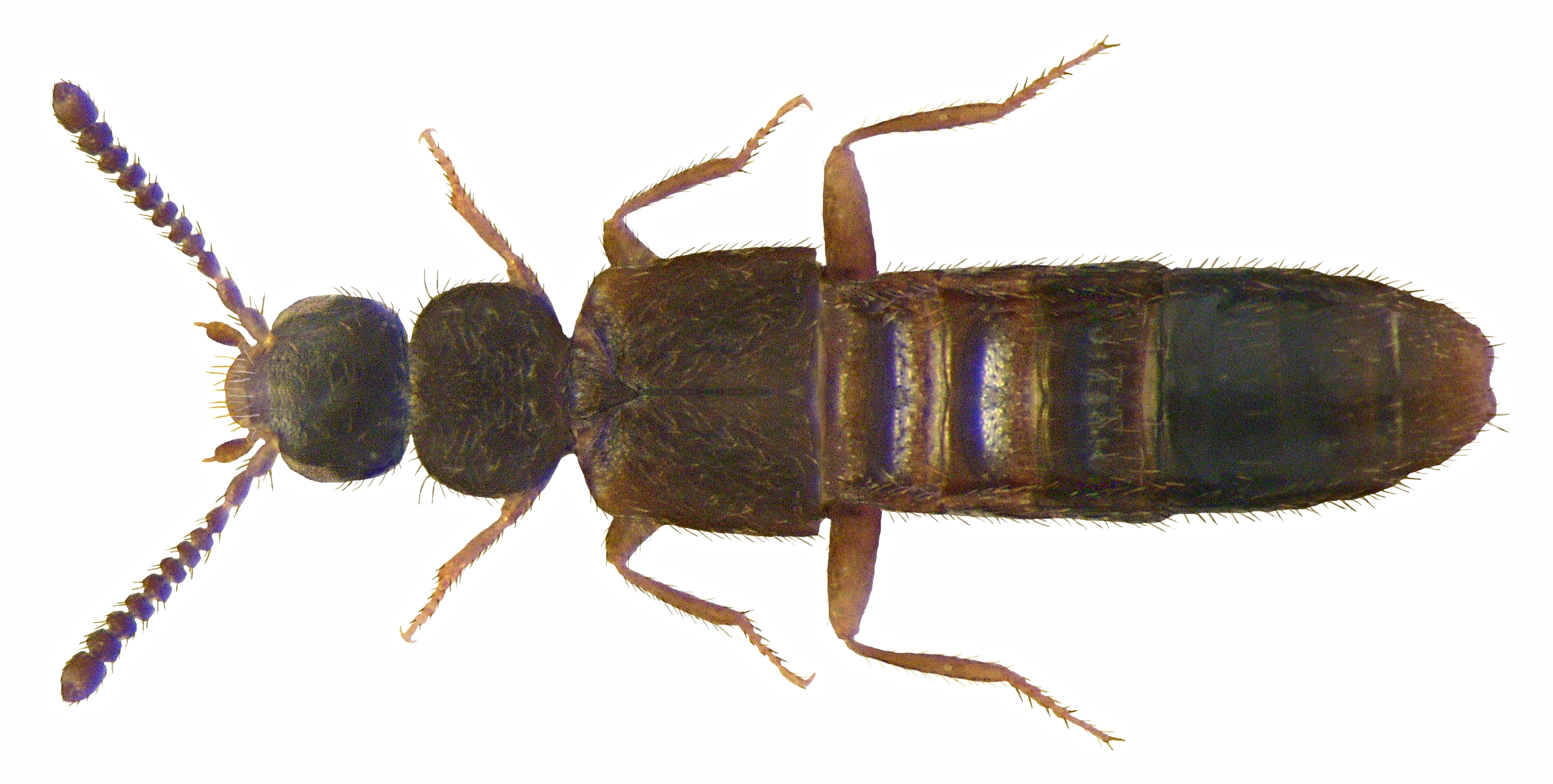
Atheta pittionii

Atheta is a genus of rove beetles in the family Staphylinidae. There are more than 640 described species in the genus Atheta.

== See also ==
- List of Atheta species
