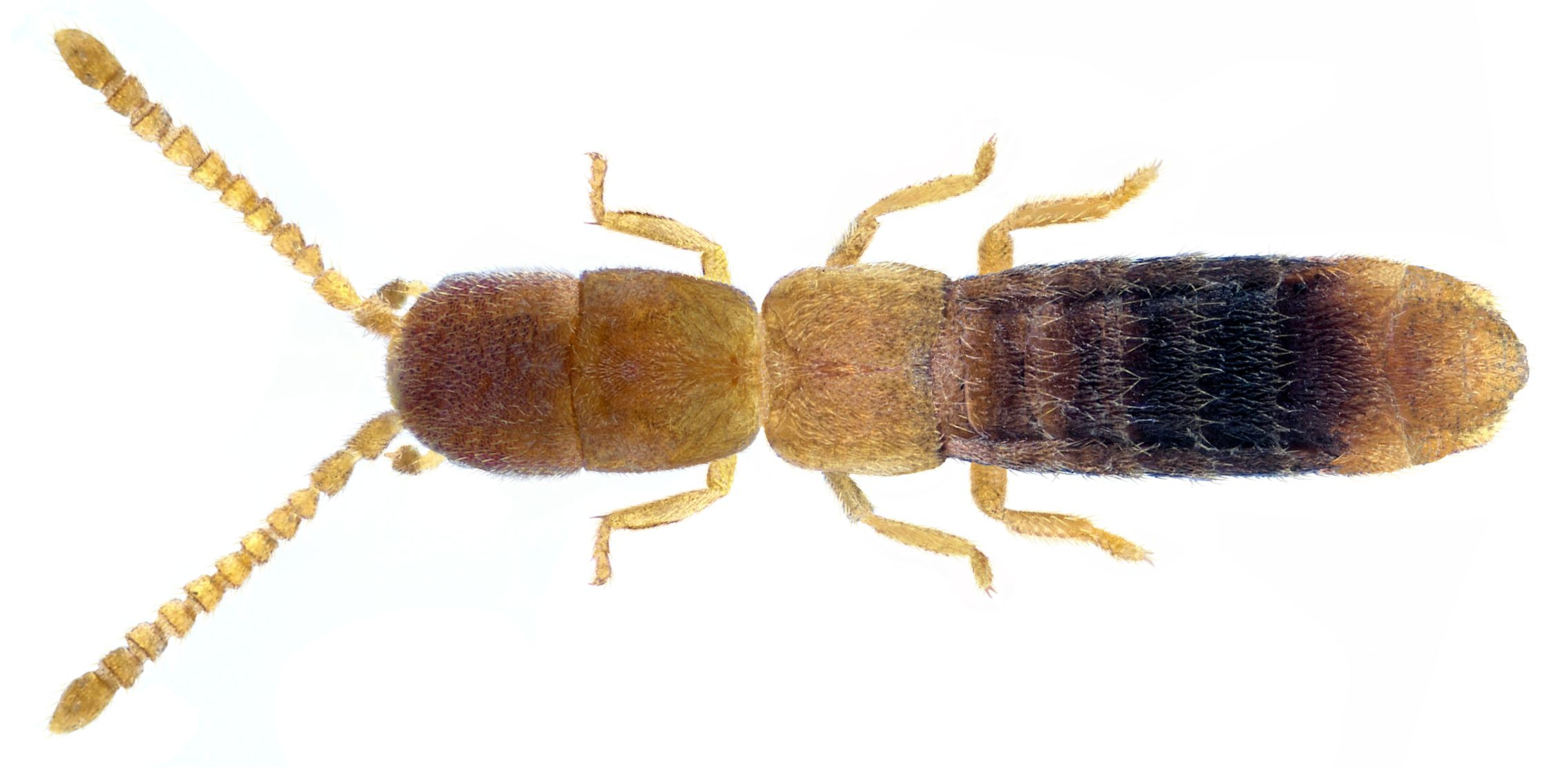
- Actocharis readingii

Scientific classification
- Kingdom: Animalia
- Phylum: Arthropoda
- Class: Insecta
- Order: Coleoptera
- Suborder: Polyphaga
- Infraorder: Staphyliniformia
- Family: Staphylinidae
- Subfamily: Aleocharinae
- Tribe: Actocharini; Bernhauer & Schubert, 1911
- Genus: Actocharis; Sharp, 1870

Species
- Actocharis calabrica Assing, 2004; Actocharis cassandrensis Assing, 1992; Actocharis readingii Sharp, 1870

= Actocharis =

Genus of beetles

Actocharis is a genus of beetles and the only genus in the tribe Actocharini.

== Distribution ==
Actocharis species are found underneath seaweed and other debris in the intertidal zone of sandy beaches along the Atlantic and Mediterranean coasts of Europe and are rarely collected due to this restricted habitat.

== Description ==
Members of this genus are 1–1.5 mm (0.039–0.059 in) long, narrow, and parallel sided. They can be identified by their 4-4-5 tarsal formula and by the structure of their mouthparts, which include two-segmented labial palps and lacinia that are longer than the galea.

== Taxonomy ==
Actocharis is placed in the tribe Actocharini, which was erected in 1911, as its only genus. The genus has been placed in several other tribes by different authors, including Homalotini, Myllaenini, and Phytosini, and in the 1920s it was briefly placed in a different subfamily Oxytelinae. Recent studies have revealed morphological and phylogenetic similarities between Actocharini and another coastal tribe, the Liparocephalini, which raises the hypothesis that they should be synonymized.

=== Species ===
Three species have been recognized:

- Actocharis calabrica Assing, 2004
- Actocharis cassandrensis Assing, 1992
- Actocharis readingii Sharp, 1870
