= List of Gyrophaena species =

This is a list of 121 species in Gyrophaena, a genus of rove beetles in the family Staphylinidae.

== Gyrophaena species ==
- Gyrophaena affinis C. Sahlberg, 1834^{i c g}
- Gyrophaena alligatrix Pace, 2007^{g}
- Gyrophaena anguiculus Pace, 2007^{g}
- Gyrophaena angustata (Stephens, 1832)^{g}
- Gyrophaena anmamontis Pace, 2007^{g}
- Gyrophaena antennalis Casey, 1906^{i c g}
- Gyrophaena arcus Pace, 2007^{g}
- Gyrophaena arizonae Seevers, 1951^{i c g}
- Gyrophaena atropatena Enushchenko^{g}
- Gyrophaena barberi Seevers, 1951^{i c g}
- Gyrophaena bihamata Thomson, 1867^{g}
- Gyrophaena bilobata Seevers, 1951^{i c g}
- Gyrophaena blackwelderi Seevers, 1951^{i c g}
- Gyrophaena blatchleyi Seevers, 1951^{i c g}
- Gyrophaena boleti (Linnaeus, 1758)^{g}
- Gyrophaena brevicollis Seevers, 1951^{i c g}
- Gyrophaena bucranium Pace, 2007^{g}
- Gyrophaena californica (Casey, 1906)^{i c g}
- Gyrophaena caputserpentis Pace, 2007^{g}
- Gyrophaena caseyi Seevers, 1951^{i c g}
- Gyrophaena caucasica A.Strand, 1939^{g}
- Gyrophaena chippewa Seevers, 1951^{i c g}
- Gyrophaena compacta Casey, 1906^{i c g}
- Gyrophaena congrua Erichson, 1837^{g}
- Gyrophaena coniciventris Casey, 1906^{i c g}
- Gyrophaena criddlei Casey, 1911^{i c g}
- Gyrophaena deprehendens Pace, 2007^{g}
- Gyrophaena draconis Pace, 2007^{g}
- Gyrophaena dybasi Seevers, 1951^{i c g}
- Gyrophaena egena Casey, 1906^{i c g}
- Gyrophaena fasciata (Marsham, 1802)^{g}
- Gyrophaena flammula Pace, 2007^{g}
- Gyrophaena flavicornis Melsheimer, 1844^{i c g b}
- Gyrophaena foraminis Pace, 2007^{g}
- Gyrophaena franciscana Seevers, 1951^{i c g}
- Gyrophaena frosti Seevers, 1951^{i c g}
- Gyrophaena fuscicollis Casey, 1906^{i c g}
- Gyrophaena gaudens Casey, 1906^{i c g}
- Gyrophaena geniculata Méklin, 1853^{g}
- Gyrophaena gentilis Erichson, 1839^{g}
- Gyrophaena gerhardi Seevers, 1951^{i c g}
- Gyrophaena gilvicollis Casey, 1906^{i c g}
- Gyrophaena gomyi Pace, 1984^{g}
- Gyrophaena gracilis Seevers, 1951^{i c g}
- Gyrophaena guadelupensis Pace, 1987^{g}
- Gyrophaena hanseni Strand, 1946^{g}
- Gyrophaena huachucae Seevers, 1951^{i c g}
- Gyrophaena illiana Seevers, 1951^{i c g}
- Gyrophaena indiana Seevers, 1951^{i c g}
- Gyrophaena insolens Casey, 1906^{i c g}
- Gyrophaena involuta Casey, 1906^{i c g}
- Gyrophaena joyi Wendeler, 1924^{g}
- Gyrophaena joyioides Wüsthoff, 1937^{g}
- Gyrophaena kangasi Rutanen, 1994^{g}
- Gyrophaena kansana Seevers, 1951^{i c g}
- Gyrophaena kaunshanchiensis Pace, 2007^{g}
- Gyrophaena keeni Casey, 1911^{i c g}
- Gyrophaena korbi A.Strand, 1939^{g}
- Gyrophaena kuanensis Pace, 2007^{g}
- Gyrophaena laetula Casey, 1906^{i c g}
- Gyrophaena laurana Casey, 1906^{i c g}
- Gyrophaena lobata Casey, 1906^{i c g}
- Gyrophaena longispinosa Seevers, 1951^{i c g}
- Gyrophaena lucidula Erichson, 1837^{g}
- Gyrophaena manca Erichson, 1839^{g}
- Gyrophaena meduxnekeagensis Klimaszewski & Webster, 2009^{g}
- Gyrophaena michigana Seevers, 1951^{i c g}
- Gyrophaena microanmashanicola Pace, 2007^{g}
- Gyrophaena minima Erichson, 1837^{g}
- Gyrophaena minimostruosa Pace, 2007^{g}
- Gyrophaena mirantennalis Pace, 2007^{g}
- Gyrophaena modesta Casey, 1906^{i c g}
- Gyrophaena monstruosa Pace, 2007^{g}
- Gyrophaena monticola Casey, 1906^{i c g}
- Gyrophaena munsteri Strand, 1935^{g}
- Gyrophaena nana (Paykull, 1800)^{i c g}
- Gyrophaena nanoides Seevers, 1951^{i c g}
- Gyrophaena neomexicana Seevers, 1951^{i c g}
- Gyrophaena neonana Seevers, 1951^{i c g}
- Gyrophaena nitidula (Gyllenhal, 1810)^{g}
- Gyrophaena obesula Casey, 1906^{i c g}
- Gyrophaena obsoleta Ganglbauer, 1895^{g}
- Gyrophaena orientalis Strand, 1938^{g}
- Gyrophaena pectinis Pace, 2007^{g}
- Gyrophaena peniculi Pace, 2007^{g}
- Gyrophaena pileusmeni Pace, 2007^{g}
- Gyrophaena piscatrix Pace, 2007^{g}
- Gyrophaena polita (Gravenhorst, 1802)^{g}
- Gyrophaena poweri Crotch, 1866^{g}
- Gyrophaena pseudocriddlei Klimaszewski & Webster, 2009^{g}
- Gyrophaena pseudonana Strand, 1939^{g}
- Gyrophaena pulchella Heer, 1839^{g}
- Gyrophaena pulli Pace, 2007^{g}
- Gyrophaena rhodeana Casey, 1906^{i c g}
- Gyrophaena rousi Dvořák, 1966^{g}
- Gyrophaena rufa Melsheimer, 1844^{i c g}
- Gyrophaena rugipennis Mulsant & Rey, 1861^{g}
- Gyrophaena sculptipennis Casey, 1906^{i c g}
- Gyrophaena sierrae Seevers, 1951^{i c g}
- Gyrophaena simpliciformis Seevers, 1951^{i c g}
- Gyrophaena simulans Seevers, 1951^{i c g}
- Gyrophaena spatulata Seevers, 1951^{i c g}
- Gyrophaena stella Pace, 2007^{g}
- Gyrophaena strictula Erichson, 1839^{g}
- Gyrophaena stroheckeri Seevers, 1951^{i c g}
- Gyrophaena subnitens Casey, 1906^{i c g}
- Gyrophaena taeniae Pace, 2007^{g}
- Gyrophaena taiwacicatricosa Pace, 2007^{g}
- Gyrophaena taiwaculeifera Pace, 2007^{g}
- Gyrophaena taiwainopinata Pace, 2007^{g}
- Gyrophaena taiwanana Pace, 2007^{g}
- Gyrophaena taiwanensis Pace, 2007^{g}
- Gyrophaena taiwanova Pace, 2007^{g}
- Gyrophaena taiwaspinosa Pace, 2007^{g}
- Gyrophaena tenebrosa Casey, 1906^{i c g}
- Gyrophaena tonensis Pace, 2007^{g}
- Gyrophaena transversalis Strand, 1939^{g}
- Gyrophaena uteana Casey, 1906^{i c g}
- Gyrophaena vitrina Casey, 1906^{i c g}
- Gyrophaena williamsi Strand, 1935^{g}
- Gyrophaena wisconsinica Seevers, 1951^{i c g}

Data sources: i = ITIS, c = Catalogue of Life, g = GBIF, b = Bugguide.net
