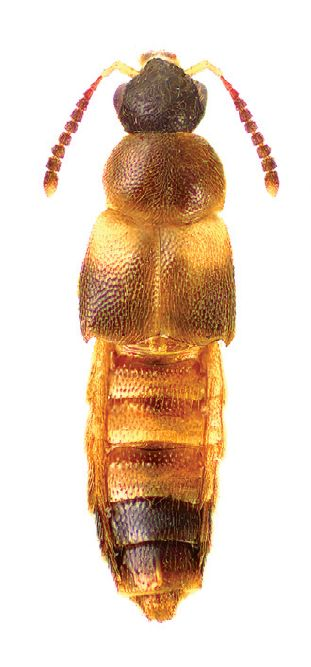
- Phymatura blanchardi

Scientific classification
- Kingdom: Animalia
- Phylum: Arthropoda
- Clade: Pancrustacea
- Class: Insecta
- Order: Coleoptera
- Suborder: Polyphaga
- Infraorder: Staphyliniformia
- Family: Staphylinidae
- Subfamily: Aleocharinae
- Tribe: Homalotini; Heer, 1839

= Homalotini =

Tribe of beetles

Homalotini is a tribe of rove beetles in the family Staphylinidae. There are at least 30 genera and 200 described species in Homalotini.

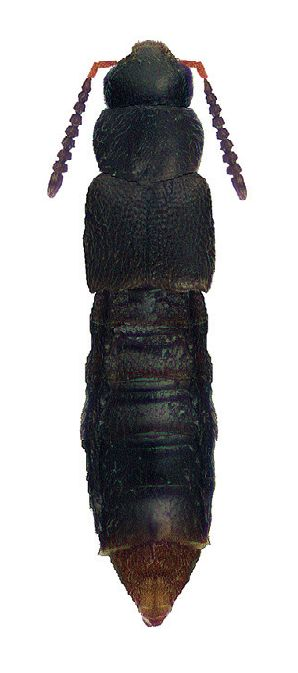
Leptusa carolinensis

== Genera ==
- Agaricochara Kraatz, 1856
- Agaricomorpha Ashe, 1984
- Anomognathus Solier, 1849
- Bolitochara Mannerheim, 1831
- Cephaloxynum Bernhauer, 1907
- Coenonica Kraatz, 1857
- Cyphea Fauvel, 1863
- Dianusa Casey, 1906
- Diestota Mulsant and Rey, 1870
- Encephalus Kirby, 1832
- Eudiestota Sharp, 1908
- Eumicrota Casey, 1906
- Eusipalia Sharp, 1908
- Gyrophaena Mannerheim, 1831
- Heterota Mulsant and Rey, 1873
- Holisomimus Cameron, 1920
- Homalota Mannerheim, 1831
- Hongophila Ashe, 1992
- Leptusa Kraatz, 1856
- Neodemosoma Pace, 1989
- Neotobia Ashe, 1992
- Orthodiatelus Notman, 1920
- Phanerota Casey, 1906
- Phymatura J. Sahlberg, 1876
- Pleurotobia Casey, 1906
- Silusa Erichson, 1837
- Silusida Casey, 1906
- Stictalia Casey, 1906
- Thecturota Casey, 1893
