= Diaulota fulviventris =

Scientific classification
- Kingdom: Animalia
- Phylum: Arthropoda
- Class: Insecta
- Order: Coleoptera
- Suborder: Polyphaga
- Infraorder: Staphyliniformia
- Family: Staphylinidae
- Subfamily: Aleocharinae
- Tribe: Liparocephalini
- Genus: Diaulota
- Species: D. fulviventris

Binomial name
- Diaulota fulviventris Moore, 1956

Species of beetle

Diaulota fulviventris is a species of rove beetle in the family Staphylinidae. It is found in Central America, North America, and Mexico.
