= Myllaena cuneata =

Scientific classification
- Kingdom: Animalia
- Phylum: Arthropoda
- Class: Insecta
- Order: Coleoptera
- Suborder: Polyphaga
- Infraorder: Staphyliniformia
- Family: Staphylinidae
- Genus: Myllaena
- Species: M. cuneata

Binomial name
- Myllaena cuneata Notman, 1920

Species of beetle

Myllaena cuneata is a species of rove beetle in the family Staphylinidae. It is found in North America.
