= Myllaenini =

Scientific classification
- Kingdom: Animalia
- Phylum: Arthropoda
- Clade: Pancrustacea
- Class: Insecta
- Order: Coleoptera
- Suborder: Polyphaga
- Infraorder: Staphyliniformia
- Family: Staphylinidae
- Subfamily: Aleocharinae
- Tribe: Myllaenini; Ganglbauer, 1895

Tribe of beetles

Myllaenini is a tribe of rove beetles in the subfamily Aleocharinae. It was first described by Ganglbauer in 1895. It contains 14 genera and 347 accepted species.

== Genera ==
- Amazonopora
- Bracypronomaea
- Bryothinusa
- Corallis
- Dimonomera
- Dysacrita
- Lautaea
- Madecamllaena
- Myllaena
- Paramyllaena
- Perupore
- Philomina
- Polypea
- Rothium
