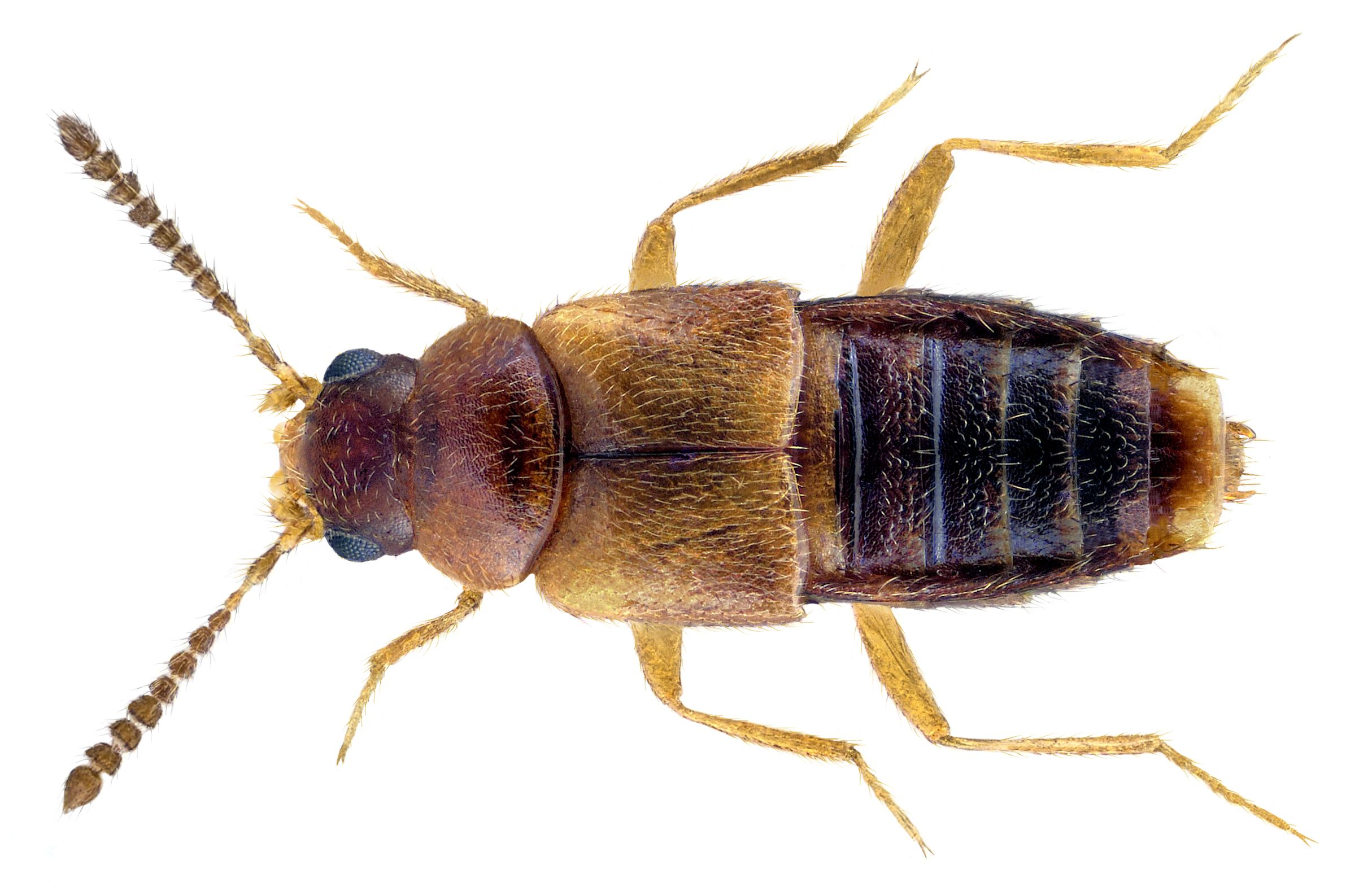

Scientific classification
- Domain: Eukaryota
- Kingdom: Animalia
- Phylum: Arthropoda
- Class: Insecta
- Order: Coleoptera
- Suborder: Polyphaga
- Infraorder: Staphyliniformia
- Family: Staphylinidae
- Genus: Agaricochara
- Species: A. latissima

Binomial name
- Agaricochara latissima Stephens, 1832)

= Agaricochara latissima =

Species of beetle

Agaricochara latissima is a species of beetle belonging to the family Staphylinidae.

It is native to Europe.
