= Gyrophaena joyi =

Scientific classification
- Domain: Eukaryota
- Kingdom: Animalia
- Phylum: Arthropoda
- Class: Insecta
- Order: Coleoptera
- Suborder: Polyphaga
- Infraorder: Staphyliniformia
- Family: Staphylinidae
- Genus: Gyrophaena
- Species: G. joyi

Binomial name
- Gyrophaena joyi Wendeler, 1924

Species of beetle

Gyrophaena joyi is a species of beetle belonging to the family Staphylinidae.

It is native to Europe.
