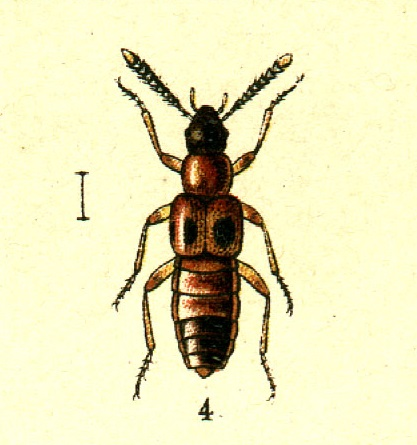

Scientific classification
- Kingdom: Animalia
- Phylum: Arthropoda
- Clade: Pancrustacea
- Class: Insecta
- Order: Coleoptera
- Suborder: Polyphaga
- Infraorder: Staphyliniformia
- Family: Staphylinidae
- Subfamily: Aleocharinae
- Tribe: Homalotini
- Genus: Bolitochara; Mannerheim, 1830

= Bolitochara =

Genus of beetles

Bolitochara is a genus of beetles belonging to the family Staphylinidae.

The genus was first described by Carl Gustaf Mannerheim in 1830.

The genus has almost cosmopolitan distribution.

Species:

- Bolitochara lucida
- Bolitochara mulsanti
- Bolitochara obliqua
- Bolitochara pulchra
