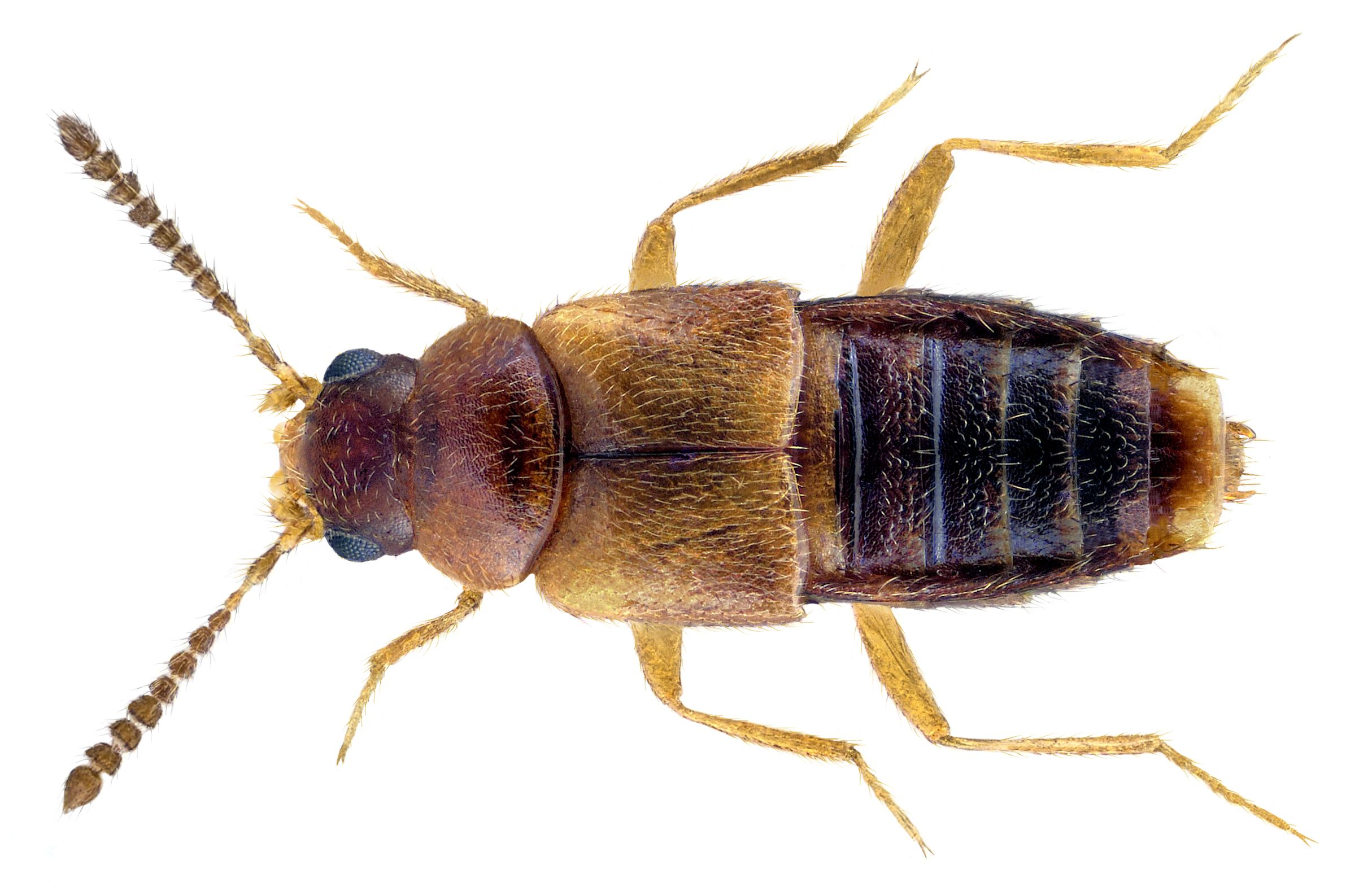
- Agaricochara latissima

Scientific classification
- Kingdom: Animalia
- Phylum: Arthropoda
- Clade: Pancrustacea
- Class: Insecta
- Order: Coleoptera
- Suborder: Polyphaga
- Infraorder: Staphyliniformia
- Family: Staphylinidae
- Subfamily: Aleocharinae
- Tribe: Homalotini
- Genus: Agaricochara; Kraatz, 1856

= Agaricochara =

Genus of beetles

Agaricochara is a genus of beetle belonging to the family Staphylinidae.

The genus was first described by Ernst Gustav Kraatz in 1856.

The species of this genus are found in Eurasia and North America.

Species:

- Agaricochara aspera (Fauvel, 1875)
- Agaricochara latissima (Stephens, 1832)
- Agaricochara fujimotoi Hashizume, 2022
