= Phanerota =

Scientific classification
- Kingdom: Animalia
- Phylum: Arthropoda
- Clade: Pancrustacea
- Class: Insecta
- Order: Coleoptera
- Suborder: Polyphaga
- Infraorder: Staphyliniformia
- Family: Staphylinidae
- Tribe: Homalotini
- Subtribe: Gyrophaenina
- Genus: Phanerota; Casey, 1906

Genus of beetles

Phanerota is a genus of rove beetles in the family Staphylinidae.

== Selected species ==
These species belong to the genus Phanerota:

- Phanerota brunnessa Ashe, 1986
- Phanerota carinata Seevers, 1951
- Phanerota cubensis Casey, 1906
- Phanerota dissimilis (Erichson, 1839)
- Phanerota fasciata (Say, 1834)
- Phanerota vecta (Pace, 1990)
