= Gyrophaena flavicornis =

Scientific classification
- Kingdom: Animalia
- Phylum: Arthropoda
- Class: Insecta
- Order: Coleoptera
- Suborder: Polyphaga
- Infraorder: Staphyliniformia
- Family: Staphylinidae
- Genus: Gyrophaena
- Species: G. flavicornis

Binomial name
- Gyrophaena flavicornis Melsheimer, 1844

Species of beetle

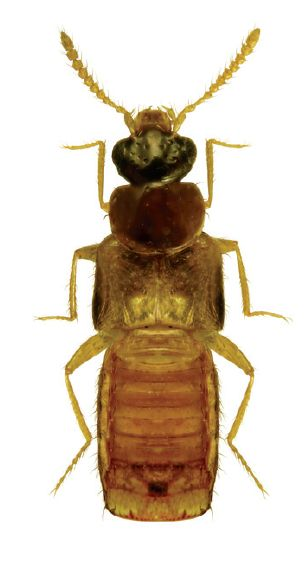

Gyrophaena flavicornis is a species of rove beetle in the family Staphylinidae. It is found in North America.
