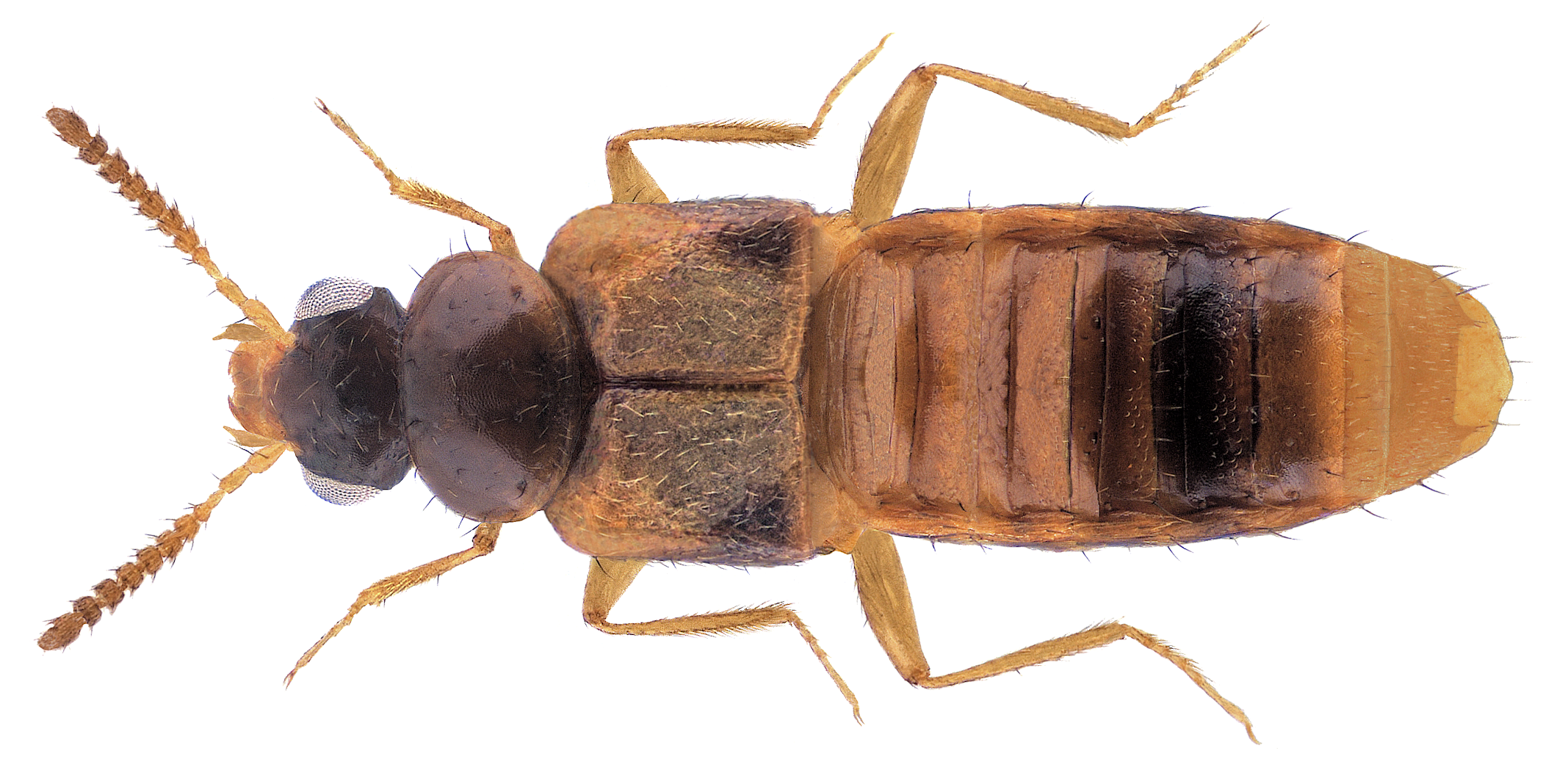
- Gyrophaena joyioides

Scientific classification
- Domain: Eukaryota
- Kingdom: Animalia
- Phylum: Arthropoda
- Class: Insecta
- Order: Coleoptera
- Suborder: Polyphaga
- Infraorder: Staphyliniformia
- Family: Staphylinidae
- Genus: Gyrophaena
- Species: G. joyioides

Binomial name
- Gyrophaena joyioides Wüsthoff, 1937

= Gyrophaena joyioides =

Species of beetle

Gyrophaena joyioides is a species of beetle belonging to the family Staphylinidae.

It is native to Europe.
