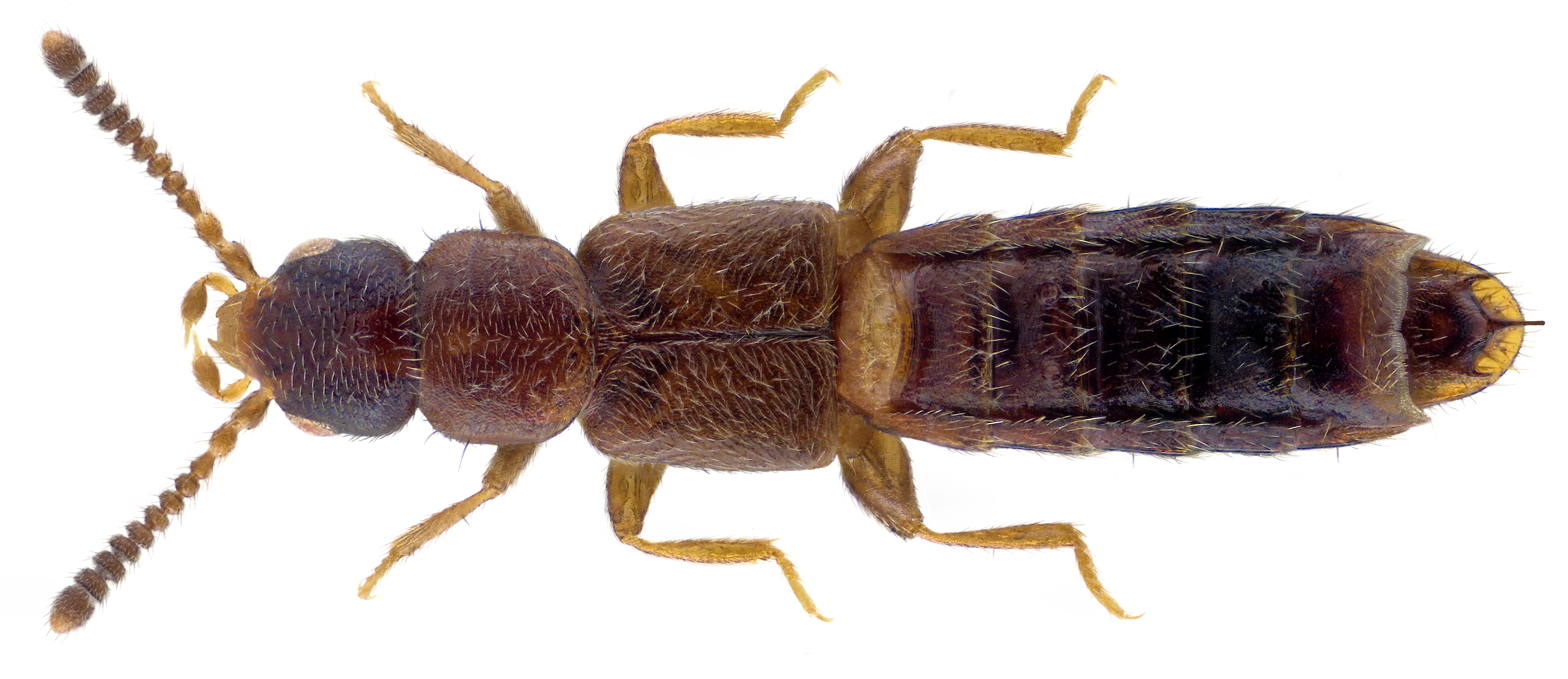
- Male Anomognathus cuspidatus specimine

Scientific classification
- Kingdom: Animalia
- Phylum: Arthropoda
- Clade: Pancrustacea
- Class: Insecta
- Order: Coleoptera
- Suborder: Polyphaga
- Infraorder: Staphyliniformia
- Family: Staphylinidae
- Subfamily: Aleocharinae
- Tribe: Homalotini
- Genus: Anomognathus; Solier, 1849

= Anomognathus =

Genus of beetles

Anomognathus is a genus of beetle belonging to the family Staphylinidae.

The genus was first described by Antoine Joseph Jean Solier in 1849.

The species of this genus are found in Europe and North America.

Species:

- Anomognathus athabascensis Klimaszewski, Hammond & Langor, 2016
- Anomognathus cuspidatus (Erichson, 1839)
