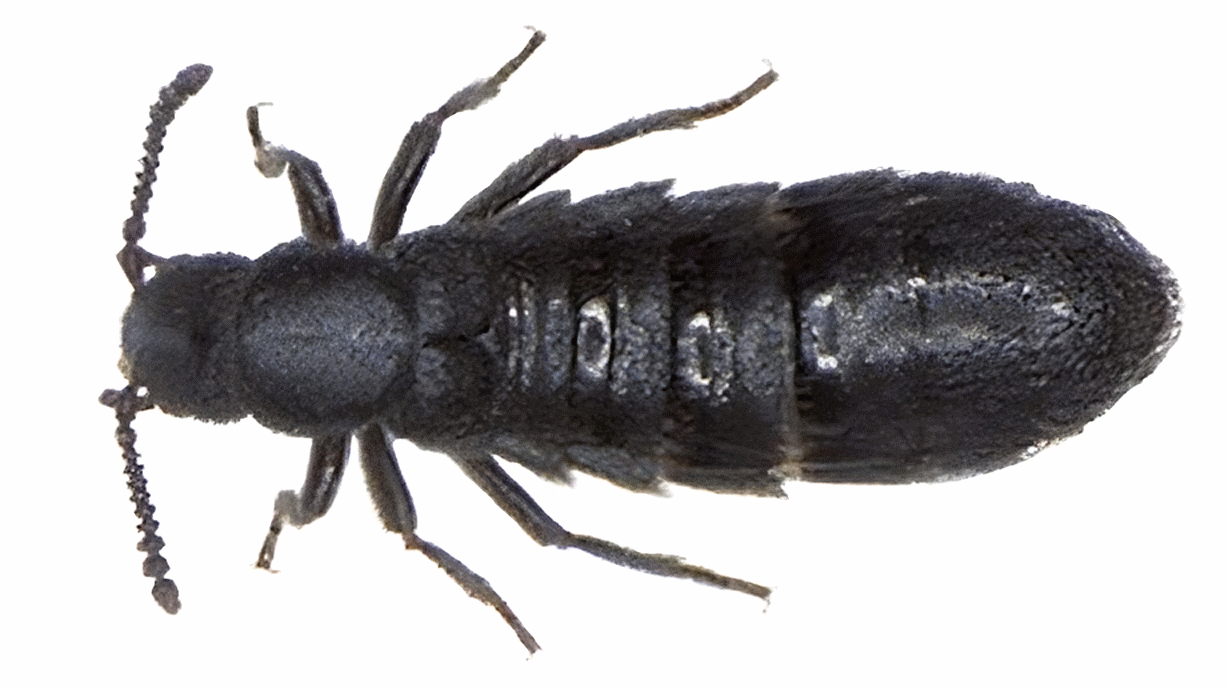
- Diaulota aokii beetle

Scientific classification
- Kingdom: Animalia
- Phylum: Arthropoda
- Class: Insecta
- Order: Coleoptera
- Suborder: Polyphaga
- Infraorder: Staphyliniformia
- Family: Staphylinidae
- Subfamily: Aleocharinae
- Tribe: Liparocephalini
- Genus: Diaulota; Casey, 1893

= Diaulota =

Genus of beetles

Diaulota is a genus of rove beetles in the family Staphylinidae. There are about eight described species in Diaulota.

== Species ==
These eight species belong to the genus Diaulota:

- Diaulota alaskana Ahn, 1996
- Diaulota aokii Sawada, 1971
- Diaulota densissima Casey, 1893
- Diaulota fulviventris Moore, 1956
- Diaulota harteri Moore, 1956
- Diaulota pacifica Sawada, 1971
- Diaulota uenoi (Sawada, 1955)
- Diaulota vandykei Moore, 1956
