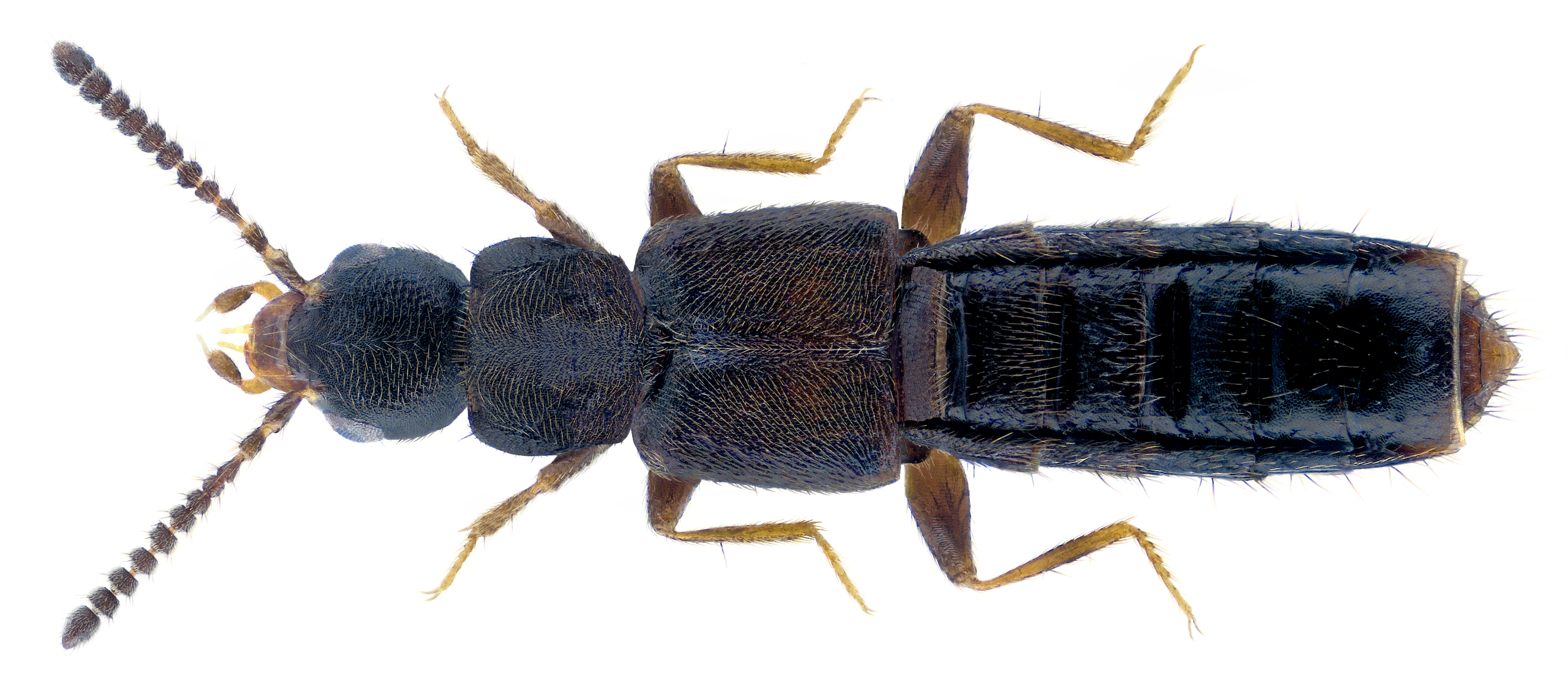
- Homalota plana

Scientific classification
- Kingdom: Animalia
- Phylum: Arthropoda
- Class: Insecta
- Order: Coleoptera
- Suborder: Polyphaga
- Infraorder: Staphyliniformia
- Family: Staphylinidae
- Genus: Homalota
- Species: H. plana

Binomial name
- Homalota plana (Gyllenhal, 1810)

= Homalota plana =

Species of beetle

Homalota plana is a species of rove beetle in the family Staphylinidae. It is found in Europe and Northern Asia (excluding China) and North America.
