= Phanerota vecta =

Scientific classification
- Kingdom: Animalia
- Phylum: Arthropoda
- Clade: Pancrustacea
- Class: Insecta
- Order: Coleoptera
- Suborder: Polyphaga
- Infraorder: Staphyliniformia
- Family: Staphylinidae
- Genus: Phanerota
- Species: P. vecta

Binomial name
- Phanerota vecta (Pace, 1990)

Synonyms
- Gyrophaena (Phanerota) vecta Pace, 1990

Species of beetle

Phanerota vecta is a species of beetle of the family Staphylinidae. It is found in French Guiana, Brazil, Peru and Argentina.

== Description ==
Adults reach a length of about 2.7 mm (0.11 in) for males and 2.5 mm (0.098 in) for females. The body is reddish-brown except for the head and the height of abdominal segments VI, which are dark brown, and tergites V and/or VII, which are paler.

== Life history ==
The recorded host fungus is a Favolus species.
