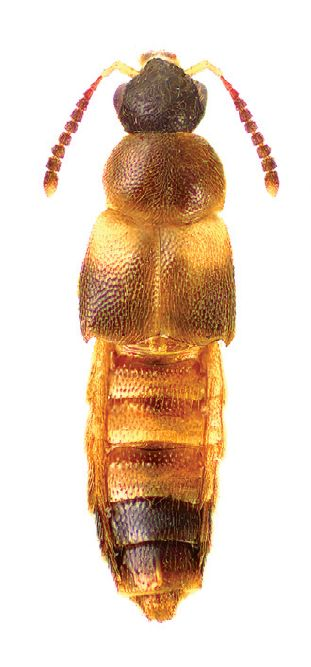

Scientific classification
- Kingdom: Animalia
- Phylum: Arthropoda
- Class: Insecta
- Order: Coleoptera
- Suborder: Polyphaga
- Infraorder: Staphyliniformia
- Family: Staphylinidae
- Genus: Phymatura
- Species: P. blanchardi

Binomial name
- Phymatura blanchardi (Casey, 1893)

= Phymatura blanchardi =

Species of beetle

Phymatura blanchardi is a species of rove beetle in the family Staphylinidae.
