= Silusida =

Scientific classification
- Kingdom: Animalia
- Phylum: Arthropoda
- Class: Insecta
- Order: Coleoptera
- Suborder: Polyphaga
- Infraorder: Staphyliniformia
- Family: Staphylinidae
- Tribe: Homalotini
- Subtribe: Bolitocharina
- Genus: Silusida; Casey, 1906

Genus of beetles

Silusida is a genus of rove beetles in the family Staphylinidae. There is one described species in Silusida, S. marginella.
