= Liparocephalus cordicollis =

Scientific classification
- Kingdom: Animalia
- Phylum: Arthropoda
- Class: Insecta
- Order: Coleoptera
- Suborder: Polyphaga
- Infraorder: Staphyliniformia
- Family: Staphylinidae
- Genus: Liparocephalus
- Species: L. cordicollis

Binomial name
- Liparocephalus cordicollis LeConte, 1880

Species of beetle

Liparocephalus cordicollis is a species of rove beetle in the family Staphylinidae. It is found in North America.
