= Liparocephalus =

Scientific classification
- Kingdom: Animalia
- Phylum: Arthropoda
- Class: Insecta
- Order: Coleoptera
- Suborder: Polyphaga
- Infraorder: Staphyliniformia
- Family: Staphylinidae
- Tribe: Liparocephalini
- Genus: Liparocephalus; Maklin, 1853

Genus of beetles

Liparocephalus is a genus of rove beetles in the family Staphylinidae. There are at least four described species in Liparocephalus.

== Species ==
These four species belong to the genus Liparocephalus:

- Liparocephalus brevipennis Mäklin, 1853
- Liparocephalus cordicollis LeConte, 1880
- Liparocephalus litoralis Kirschenblatt, 1938
- Liparocephalus tokunagai Sakaguti, 1944
