= Phanerota fasciata =

Scientific classification
- Kingdom: Animalia
- Phylum: Arthropoda
- Class: Insecta
- Order: Coleoptera
- Suborder: Polyphaga
- Infraorder: Staphyliniformia
- Family: Staphylinidae
- Genus: Phanerota
- Species: P. fasciata

Binomial name
- Phanerota fasciata (Say, 1834)

Species of beetle

Phanerota fasciata is a species of rove beetle in the family Staphylinidae. It is found in North America. It lives in the gills of mushrooms both as a larva and adult.
