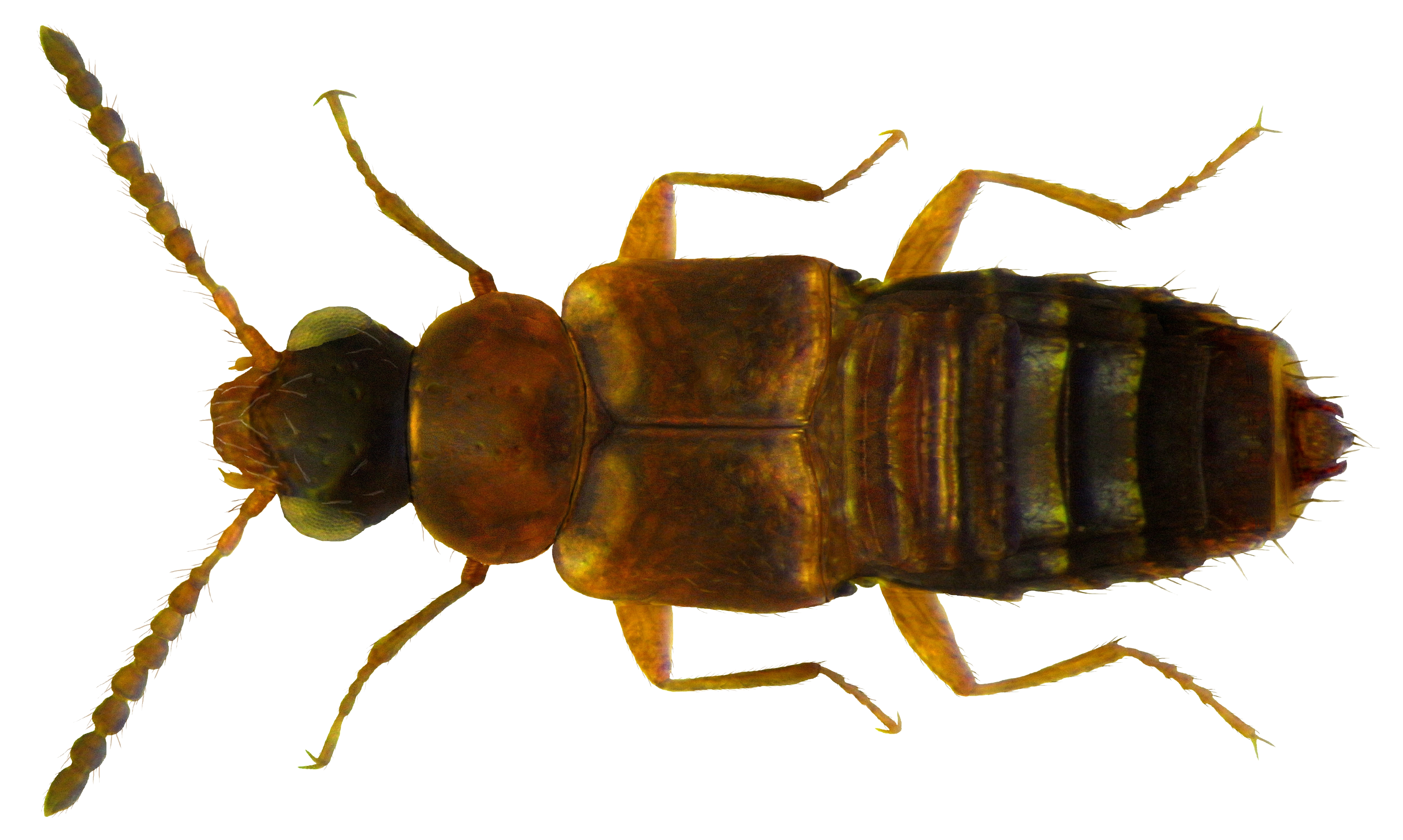
- Gyrophaena affinis 1,8-2,3 mm

Scientific classification
- Kingdom: Animalia
- Phylum: Arthropoda
- Class: Insecta
- Order: Coleoptera
- Suborder: Polyphaga
- Infraorder: Staphyliniformia
- Family: Staphylinidae
- Genus: Gyrophaena
- Species: G. affinis

Binomial name
- Gyrophaena affinis (Sahlberg, 1830)

= Gyrophaena affinis =

Species of beetle

Gyrophaena affinis is a species of rove beetle native to Europe.
