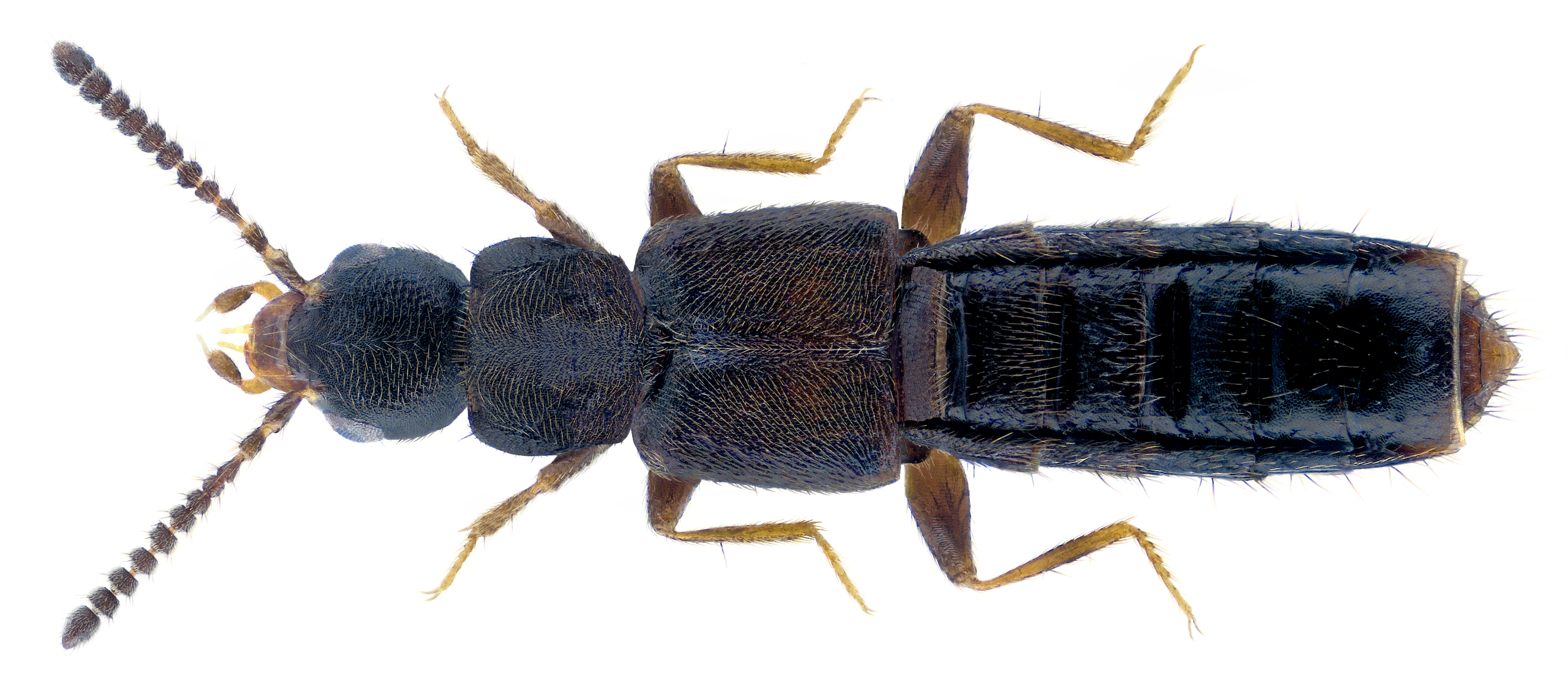
- Homalota plana (Gyllenhal, c.1810)

Scientific classification
- Kingdom: Animalia
- Phylum: Arthropoda
- Clade: Pancrustacea
- Class: Insecta
- Order: Coleoptera
- Suborder: Polyphaga
- Infraorder: Staphyliniformia
- Family: Staphylinidae
- Subtribe: Homalotina
- Genus: Homalota; Mannerheim, 1831

= Homalota =

Genus of beetles

Homalota is a genus of rove beetles in the family Staphylinidae. There are more than 80 described species in Homalota.

== Species ==
These 86 species belong to the genus Homalota:

- Epipeda angusticeps Sharp, 1883
- Epipeda brevicornis Sharp, 1883
- Epipeda debilis Sharp, 1883
- Epipeda delicatula Sharp, 1883
- Epipeda discedens Sharp, 1883
- Epipeda linearis Sharp, 1883
- Epipeda longiceps Sharp, 1883
- Epipeda longula Sharp, 1883
- Epipeda minor Sharp, 1883
- Epipeda minuta Sharp, 1883
- Epipeda pumila Sharp, 1883
- Epipeda puncticeps Sharp, 1883
- Epipeda reyi Sharp, 1883
- Epipeda sordida Sharp, 1883
- Homalota alticola Sharp, 1883
- Homalota annulata Sharp, 1883
- Homalota basiventris Sharp, 1883
- Homalota brevis Sharp, 1876
- Homalota capta Sharp, 1876
- Homalota carinata Sharp, 1883
- Homalota centralis Sharp, 1883
- Homalota certata Sharp, 1883
- Homalota championi Sharp, 1883
- Homalota chiriquensis Sharp, 1883
- Homalota cingulifera Sharp, 1883
- Homalota cognata Sharp, 1883
- Homalota colorata Sharp, 1883
- Homalota consimilis Sharp, 1883
- Homalota consors Sharp, 1883
- Homalota culpa Sharp, 1876
- Homalota debilis (Sharp, 1883)
- Homalota depressiuscula Mannerheim, 1831
- Homalota despecta Sharp, 1883
- Homalota diffinis Sharp, 1883
- Homalota difformis Mulsant & Rey, 1853
- Homalota discrepans Sharp, 1883
- Homalota dissimilis Sharp, 1883
- Homalota evanescens Sharp, 1883
- Homalota flavicauda Sharp, 1883
- Homalota flexibilis Casey, 1911
- Homalota fraterna (Sharp, 1888)
- Homalota frigidula Casey, 1911
- Homalota funesta Casey, 1911
- Homalota gilva Sharp, 1876
- Homalota godmani Sharp, 1883
- Homalota guatemalae Sharp, 1883
- Homalota hesperica Casey, 1911
- Homalota heterocera Sharp, 1883
- Homalota hirtiventris Sharp, 1883
- Homalota humilis Casey, 1911
- Homalota jugicola Sharp, 1883
- Homalota laeticula Sharp, 1883
- Homalota lepidula Casey, 1911
- Homalota leucoptera Sharp, 1883
- Homalota libera Sharp, 1883
- Homalota longifrons Sharp, 1883
- Homalota megacephala Fauvel, 1867
- Homalota mikado Likovsky, 1984
- Homalota moesta Mäklin, 1852
- Homalota mollis Sharp, 1883
- Homalota montium Sharp, 1883
- Homalota mundula Sharp, 1883
- Homalota nitens Mäklin, 1852
- Homalota opacicollis (Bernhauer, 1907)
- Homalota pectoralis Sharp, 1883
- Homalota perdita Sharp, 1883
- Homalota plana (Gyllenhal, 1810)
- Homalota prolixa Sharp, 1883
- Homalota pumila Sharp, 1883
- Homalota quaesticula Sharp, 1883
- Homalota recisa Scudder, 1890
- Homalota rufiventris Sharp, 1883
- Homalota sallaei Sharp, 1883
- Homalota sauteri Bernhauer, 1907
- Homalota semiobscura Sharp, 1883
- Homalota serrata Assing
- Homalota sobrina Sharp, 1883
- Homalota spergula Sharp, 1883
- Homalota tenax Sharp, 1876
- Homalota terminicornis Sharp, 1883
- Homalota thoracica Sharp, 1883
- Homalota traili Sharp, 1876
- Homalota trisignata Sharp, 1883
- Homalota tristicula Mulsant & Rey, 1873
- Homalota vexata Sharp, 1883
- Homalota wickhami Casey, 1911
