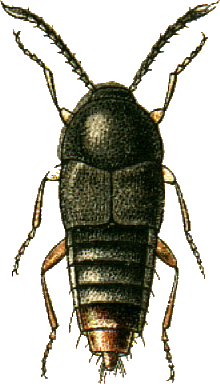
- Myllaena intermedia

Scientific classification
- Kingdom: Animalia
- Phylum: Arthropoda
- Class: Insecta
- Order: Coleoptera
- Suborder: Polyphaga
- Infraorder: Staphyliniformia
- Family: Staphylinidae
- Subfamily: Aleocharinae
- Genus: Myllaena; Erichson, 1837

= Myllaena =

Genus of beetles

Myllaena is a genus of rove beetles in the family Staphylinidae. There are more than 60 described species in Myllaena.

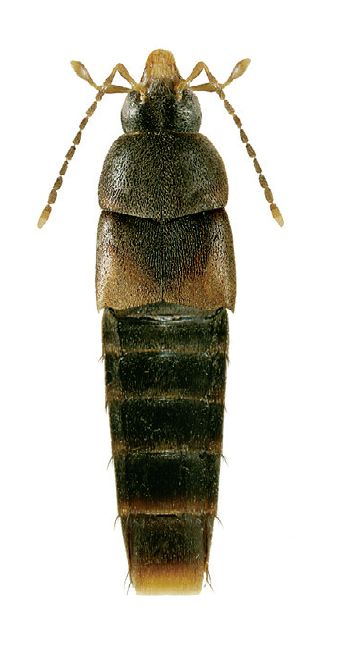
Myllaena vulpina

== Species ==
These 66 species belong to the genus Myllaena:

- Centroglossa conuroides Matthews, 1838
- Myllaena apetina Sharp, 1908
- Myllaena arcana Casey, 1911
- Myllaena audax Casey, 1911
- Myllaena brasiliensis Caron & Klimaszewski, 2008
- Myllaena brevicollis Casey, 1911
- Myllaena brevicornis (Matthews, 1838)
- Myllaena cognata Sharp, 1908
- Myllaena cornelli Pace, 1997
- Myllaena cuneata Notman, 1920
- Myllaena currax Notman, 1920
- Myllaena curtipes Sharp, 1880
- Myllaena debilicornis Sharp, 1883
- Myllaena decreta Casey, 1911
- Myllaena dinahae Klimaszewski, 1992
- Myllaena discedens Sharp, 1880
- Myllaena dubia (Gravenhorst, 1806)
- Myllaena elongata (Matthews, 1838)
- Myllaena esuriens Casey
- Myllaena familiaris Sharp, 1880
- Myllaena fenyesi Bernhauer, 1907
- Myllaena fragilis Sharp, 1883
- Myllaena frivola Casey
- Myllaena gourvesi Coiffait, 1976
- Myllaena gracilis (Matthews, 1838)
- Myllaena graeca Kraatz, 1858
- Myllaena guadalupensis Pace, 1987
- Myllaena haleakalae Sharp, 1908
- Myllaena hopi Klimaszewski, 1982
- Myllaena hopkinton Klimaszewski, 1982
- Myllaena hyperborea Strand, 1943
- Myllaena impellens Casey
- Myllaena infuscata Kraatz, 1853
- Myllaena insipiens Casey, 1911
- Myllaena insomnis Casey, 1911
- Myllaena insularis Fenyes
- Myllaena intermedia Erichson, 1837
- Myllaena kaskaskia Klimaszewski, 1982
- Myllaena koasati Klimaszewski, 1982
- Myllaena kraatzi Sharp, 1871
- Myllaena ludificans Casey, 1911
- Myllaena magnicollis Cameron
- Myllaena magnolia Klimaszewski, 1982
- Myllaena masoni Matthews, 1883
- Myllaena minuta (Gravenhorst, 1806)
- Myllaena mollis Sharp, 1883
- Myllaena neozelandensis Pace, 2008
- Myllaena nivium Pace, 1984
- Myllaena numeensis Pace, 1991
- Myllaena oahuensis Blackburn, 1885
- Myllaena obtusa Sharp, 1883
- Myllaena oxypodina Sharp, 1908
- Myllaena pacifica Sharp, 1880
- Myllaena potawatomi Klimaszewski, 1982
- Myllaena procidua Casey, 1911
- Myllaena pubescens Last, 1966
- Myllaena reunionensis Pace, 1984
- Myllaena robusta Sharp, 1883
- Myllaena rufescens Sharp, 1908
- Myllaena schauenbergi Pace, 1984
- Myllaena seminole Klimaszewski, 1982
- Myllaena serrano Klimaszewski, 1982
- Myllaena tangarakauensis Pace, 2015
- Myllaena tenuicornis Fauvel, 1900
- Myllaena vicina Sharp, 1880
- Myllaena vulpina Bernhauer, 1907
