= Phytosini =

Scientific classification
- Kingdom: Animalia
- Phylum: Arthropoda
- Clade: Pancrustacea
- Class: Insecta
- Order: Coleoptera
- Suborder: Polyphaga
- Infraorder: Staphyliniformia
- Family: Staphylinidae
- Subfamily: Aleocharinae
- Tribe: Phytosini; Thomson, 1867

Tribe of beetles

Phytosini is a tribe of rove beetles in the subfamily Aleocharinae. It was first described by C.G. Thomson in 1867. It contains 3 genera and 10 species.

== Genera and species ==
- Arena
  - Arena fultoni
  - Arena tabida
- Euphytosus
  - Euphytosus schenklingi
- Phytosus
  - Phytosus andalusiaensis
  - Phytosus balticus
  - Phytosus nigriventris
  - Phytosus schatzmayri
  - Phytosus caribeanus
  - Phytosus fenyesi
  - Phytosus spinifer
