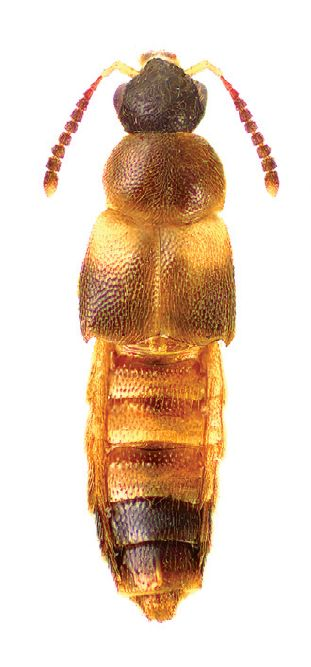
- Phymatura blanchardi

Scientific classification
- Kingdom: Animalia
- Phylum: Arthropoda
- Class: Insecta
- Order: Coleoptera
- Suborder: Polyphaga
- Infraorder: Staphyliniformia
- Family: Staphylinidae
- Subtribe: Bolitocharina
- Genus: Phymatura; J. Sahlberg, 1876

= Phymatura =

Genus of beetles

Phymatura is a genus of rove beetles in the family Staphylinidae. There are at least 2 described species in Phymatura.

== Species ==
- Phymatura blanchardi
- Phymatura brevicollis (Kraatz, 1857)
