= Liparocephalini =

Scientific classification
- Kingdom: Animalia
- Phylum: Arthropoda
- Class: Insecta
- Order: Coleoptera
- Suborder: Polyphaga
- Infraorder: Staphyliniformia
- Family: Staphylinidae
- Subfamily: Aleocharinae
- Tribe: Liparocephalini; Fenyes, 1918

Tribe of beetles

Liparocephalini is a tribe of rove beetles in the family Staphylinidae. There are about 5 genera and more than 20 described species in Liparocephalini.

== Genera ==
These five genera belong to the tribe Liparocephalini:

- Amblopusa Casey, 1893
- Diaulota Casey, 1893
- Liparocephalus Maklin, 1853
- Paramblopusa Ahn & Ashe, 1996
- Salinamexus Moore & Legner, 1977
