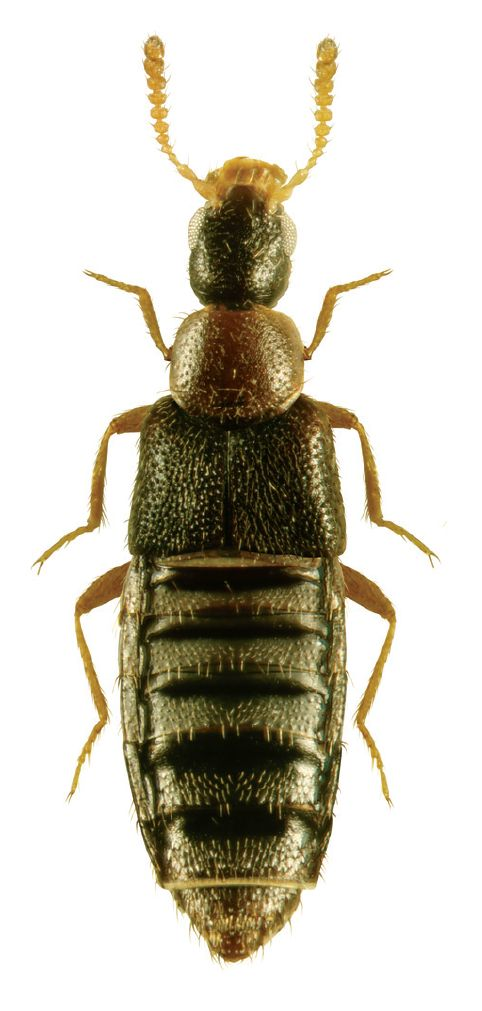
- Gyrophaena gracilis

Scientific classification
- Kingdom: Animalia
- Phylum: Arthropoda
- Clade: Pancrustacea
- Class: Insecta
- Order: Coleoptera
- Suborder: Polyphaga
- Infraorder: Staphyliniformia
- Family: Staphylinidae
- Subfamily: Aleocharinae
- Tribe: Homalotini
- Subtribe: Gyrophaenina
- Genus: Gyrophaena; Mannerheim, 1831

Diversity
- At least 120 species

= Gyrophaena =

Genus of beetles

Gyrophaena is a genus of rove beetles in the family Staphylinidae. There are more than 160 described species in Gyrophaena.

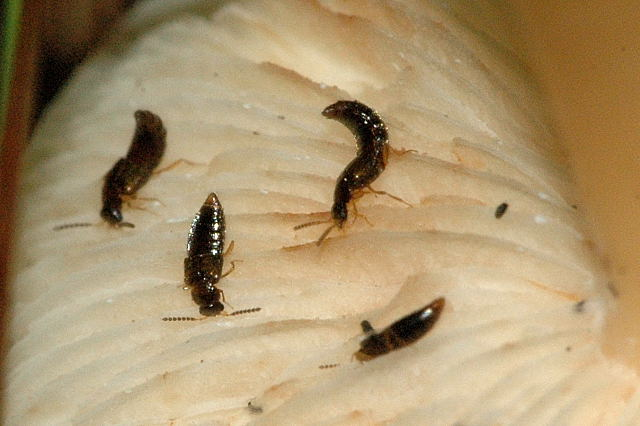

== See also ==
- List of Gyrophaena species
