= Lissagria laeviuscula =

Scientific classification
- Kingdom: Animalia
- Phylum: Arthropoda
- Class: Insecta
- Order: Coleoptera
- Suborder: Polyphaga
- Infraorder: Staphyliniformia
- Family: Staphylinidae
- Genus: Lissagria
- Species: L. laeviuscula

Binomial name
- Lissagria laeviuscula (LeConte, 1866)

Species of beetle

Lissagria laeviuscula is a species of rove beetle in the family Staphylinidae. It is found in North America.
