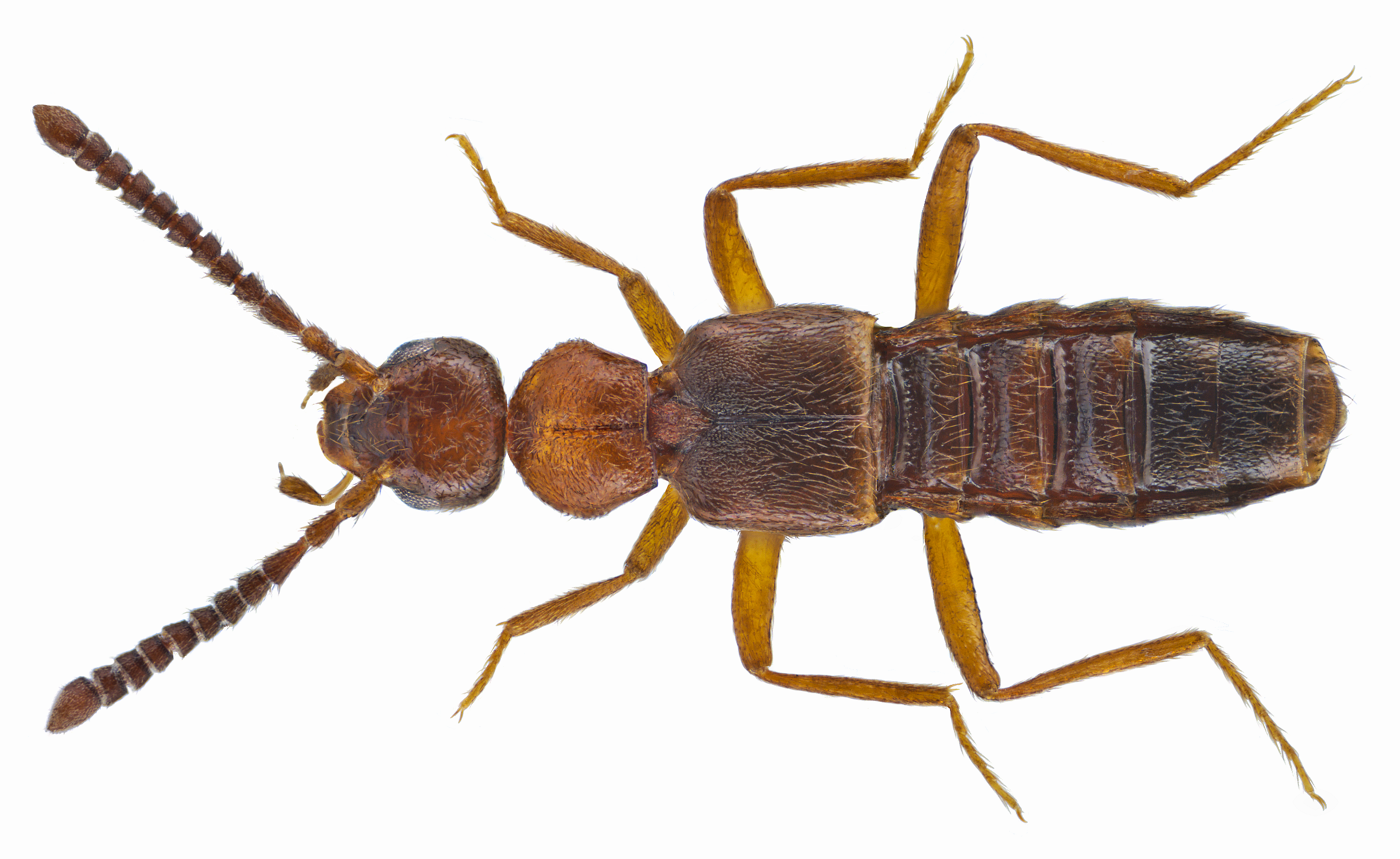
- Falagrioma thoracica

Scientific classification
- Kingdom: Animalia
- Phylum: Arthropoda
- Class: Insecta
- Order: Coleoptera
- Suborder: Polyphaga
- Infraorder: Staphyliniformia
- Family: Staphylinidae
- Subfamily: Aleocharinae
- Tribe: Falagriini; Mulsant & Rey, 1873

= Falagriini =

Tribe of beetles

Falagriini is a tribe of rove beetles in the family Staphylinidae. There are about 11 genera and at least 20 described species in Falagriini.

== Genera ==
These 11 genera belong to the tribe Falagriini:

- Aleodorus Say, 1830^{i c g b}
- Borboropora Kraatz, 1862^{i c g}
- Bryobiota Casey, 1893^{i c g}
- Cordalia Jacobs, 1925^{i c g b}
- Falagria Leach, 1819^{i c g b}
- Falagrioma Casey, 1906^{i c g}
- Falagriota Casey, 1906^{i c g}
- Leptagria Casey, 1906^{i c g}
- Lissagria Casey, 1906^{i c g b}
- Myrmecocephalus MacLeay, 1873^{i c g b}
- Myrmecopora Saulcy, 1864^{i c g}

Data sources: i = ITIS, c = Catalogue of Life, g = GBIF, b = Bugguide.net
