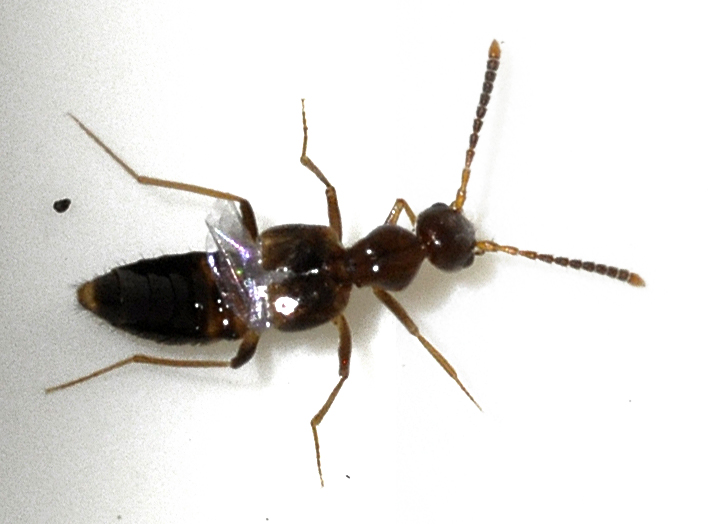
- Myrmecocephalus concinnus

Scientific classification
- Kingdom: Animalia
- Phylum: Arthropoda
- Class: Insecta
- Order: Coleoptera
- Suborder: Polyphaga
- Infraorder: Staphyliniformia
- Family: Staphylinidae
- Tribe: Falagriini
- Genus: Myrmecocephalus; MacLeay, 1871

Synonyms
- Lorinota Casey, 1906; Stenagria Sharp, 1883; Stilicioides Broun, 1880

= Myrmecocephalus =

Genus of beetles

Myrmecocephalus is a genus of beetles belonging to the family Staphylinidae. It has a nearly cosmopolitan distribution.

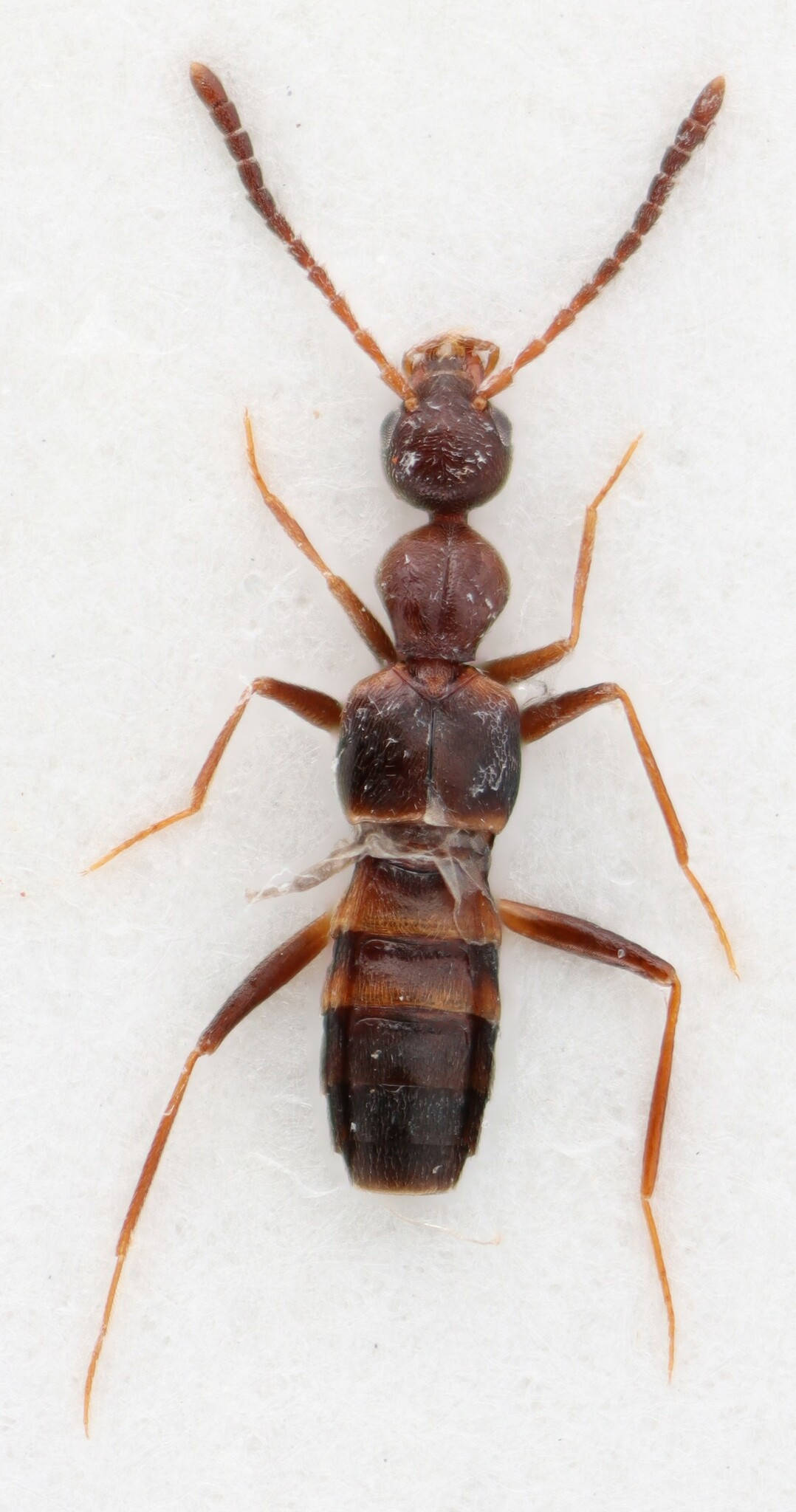
Myrmecocephalus cingulatus

== Species ==
As of early 2026, there are 115 recognized species:

- Myrmecocephalus alluaudi (Fauvel, 1907)
- Myrmecocephalus alutipennis (Cameron, 1939)
- Myrmecocephalus amiculus (Last, 1980)
- Myrmecocephalus andrewesi (Cameron, 1939)
- Myrmecocephalus angusticeps (Cameron, 1941)
- Myrmecocephalus anommatophilus (Cameron, 1926)
- Myrmecocephalus arizonicus (Casey, 1906)
- Myrmecocephalus asperatus (Cameron, 1920)
- Myrmecocephalus australicus (Bernhauer & Scheerpeltz, 1926)
- Myrmecocephalus basalis (Fauvel, 1878)
- Myrmecocephalus basiventrides Newton, 2017
- Myrmecocephalus basiventris (Cameron, 1923)
- Myrmecocephalus becquarti (Bernhauer, 1938)
- Myrmecocephalus bipunctatus (Tottenham, 1957)
- Myrmecocephalus brevicornis (Cameron, 1920)
- Myrmecocephalus brevisulcus (Pace, 2008)
- Myrmecocephalus bruneiensis (Pace, 2004)
- Myrmecocephalus cameroni Hoebeke, 1985
- Myrmecocephalus caviceps (Casey, 1906)
- Myrmecocephalus chakratanus (Cameron, 1944)
- Myrmecocephalus championi (Cameron, 1939)
- Myrmecocephalus chang (Pace, 1993)
- Myrmecocephalus cingulatus (LeConte, J. L., 1866)
- Myrmecocephalus concavus (Pace, 1986)
- Myrmecocephalus concinnus (Erichson, 1839)
- Myrmecocephalus constrictus (Sharp, 1883)
- Myrmecocephalus derougemonti (Pace, 1986)
- Myrmecocephalus differens (Cameron, 1936)
- Myrmecocephalus dimidiatus (Motschulsky, 1858)
- Myrmecocephalus distractus (Pace, 1991)
- Myrmecocephalus divisus (Erichson, 1839)
- Myrmecocephalus ecustricta (Pace, 2011)
- Myrmecocephalus excisus (Last, 1980)
- Myrmecocephalus fauveli (Solsky, 1868)
- Myrmecocephalus festivus (Cameron, 1939)
- Myrmecocephalus fictus (Pace, 1992)
- Myrmecocephalus flavocinctus (Kraatz, 1859)
- Myrmecocephalus formicarius (Fauvel, 1879)
- Myrmecocephalus gatineauensis Hoebeke, 1985
- Myrmecocephalus genalis (Cameron, 1939)
- Myrmecocephalus gonzalezi (Pace, 1999)
- Myrmecocephalus gracilipes (Sharp, 1883)
- Myrmecocephalus gracilis (Casey, 1906)
- Myrmecocephalus granulatus (Cameron, 1939)
- Myrmecocephalus hartmanni (Pace, 2006)
- Myrmecocephalus himalayicus (Cameron, 1939)
- Myrmecocephalus hisamatsui (Sawada, K. & Nakane, 1954)
- Myrmecocephalus houlberti (Coiffait, 1987)
- Myrmecocephalus humeralis (Sharp, 1883)
- Myrmecocephalus impressicollis (Cameron, 1946)
- Myrmecocephalus japonicus (Bernhauer, 1939)
- Myrmecocephalus javanicus (Cameron, 1939)
- Myrmecocephalus latesulcatus (Cameron, 1939)
- Myrmecocephalus longiceps (Cameron, 1939)
- Myrmecocephalus madafulva (Pace, 2010)
- Myrmecocephalus madurensis (Bernhauer, 1915)
- Myrmecocephalus magnificus (Pace, 2010)
- Myrmecocephalus malaisei (Scheerpeltz, 1965)
- Myrmecocephalus malayanus (Cameron, 1950)
- Myrmecocephalus materculus (Last, 1980)
- Myrmecocephalus mendax (Pace, 1986)
- Myrmecocephalus mexicanus (Pace, 1990)
- Myrmecocephalus micans (Broun, 1880)
- Myrmecocephalus mixtus (Cameron, 1943)
- Myrmecocephalus moluccanus (Pace, 2012)
- Myrmecocephalus monnoti (Coiffait, 1987)
- Myrmecocephalus monticolus (Cameron, 1928)
- Myrmecocephalus mudranus (Pace, 1991)
- Myrmecocephalus myrmecolucidus (Pace, 2008)
- Myrmecocephalus nakuruensis (Pace, 1994)
- Myrmecocephalus neoguineana (Pace, 2015)
- Myrmecocephalus nepalhimalayica (Pace, 2013)
- Myrmecocephalus newarus (Pace, 1991)
- Myrmecocephalus nigrita (Cameron, 1939)
- Myrmecocephalus nilgiriensis (Fauvel, 1904)
- Myrmecocephalus opacellus (Cameron, 1939)
- Myrmecocephalus opacicollis (Kraatz, 1859)
- Myrmecocephalus opaculus (Sharp, 1883)
- Myrmecocephalus optimatus (Last, 1980)
- Myrmecocephalus orientalis (Cameron, 1925)
- Myrmecocephalus otongensis (Pace, 2008)
- Myrmecocephalus pahari (Pace, 2013)
- Myrmecocephalus pallipennis (Cameron, 1939)
- Myrmecocephalus paranitens (Pace, 2004)
- Myrmecocephalus peinantamontis (Pace, 2008)
- Myrmecocephalus philippinus (Cameron, 1941)
- Myrmecocephalus picticornis (Pace, 1987)
- Myrmecocephalus pinalicus (Casey, 1906)
- Myrmecocephalus pravatis (Last, 1980)
- Myrmecocephalus proximus (Cameron, 1933)
- Myrmecocephalus pseudosoror (Pace, 1986)
- Myrmecocephalus quaesitus (Pace, 1993)
- Myrmecocephalus santiaganus (Pace, 1999)
- Myrmecocephalus sapidus (Sharp, 1874)
- Myrmecocephalus schawalleri (Coiffait, 1982)
- Myrmecocephalus schola (Last, 1980)
- Myrmecocephalus sculpturatus Hoebeke, 1985
- Myrmecocephalus selangorensis (Cameron, 1950)
- Myrmecocephalus semilucens (Cameron, 1950)
- Myrmecocephalus semilucidus (Cameron, 1939)
- Myrmecocephalus seminitens (Cameron, 1933)
- Myrmecocephalus semipolitus (Cameron, 1944)
- Myrmecocephalus siamensis (Pace, 1986)
- Myrmecocephalus sikharianus (Pace, 1991)
- Myrmecocephalus sinogilva (Pace, 2017)
- Myrmecocephalus smetanai (Pace, 1991)
- Myrmecocephalus soror (Cameron, 1939)
- Myrmecocephalus sororellus (Pace, 1986)
- Myrmecocephalus sparsipennis (Cameron, 1933)
- Myrmecocephalus strictus (Erichson, 1839)
- Myrmecocephalus taiwaelegans (Pace, 2008)
- Myrmecocephalus taiwaroridus (Pace, 2008)
- Myrmecocephalus tonkinensis (Cameron, 1946)
- Myrmecocephalus tsin (Pace, 1993)
- Myrmecocephalus valparaisensis (Pace, 1999)
- Myrmecocephalus vexans (Cameron, 1939)
- Myrmecocephalus xishanensis (Pace, 1998)
- Myrmecocephalus zerchei (Pace, 1993)
- Myrmecocephalus zhejiangensis (Pace, 1998)
