= Aleodorus =

Scientific classification
- Kingdom: Animalia
- Phylum: Arthropoda
- Class: Insecta
- Order: Coleoptera
- Suborder: Polyphaga
- Infraorder: Staphyliniformia
- Family: Staphylinidae
- Tribe: Falagriini
- Genus: Aleodorus; Say, 1830

Genus of beetles

Aleodorus is a genus of rove beetles in the family Staphylinidae. It is distributed in the Americas. There are about 15–18 recognized species.

== Species ==
The genus Aleodorus includes these four North American species:

- Aleodorus bilobatus (Say, 1830)^{i g b}
- Aleodorus intricatus (Casey, 1906)^{i g b}
- Aleodorus partitus (LeConte, 1866)^{i g}
- Aleodorus scutellaris (LeConte, 1866)^{i b g}

Data sources: i = ITIS, g = GBIF, b = Bugguide.net
