= Falagria sulcata =

Scientific classification
- Kingdom: Animalia
- Phylum: Arthropoda
- Clade: Pancrustacea
- Class: Insecta
- Order: Coleoptera
- Suborder: Polyphaga
- Infraorder: Staphyliniformia
- Family: Staphylinidae
- Genus: Falagria
- Species: F. sulcata

Binomial name
- Falagria sulcata (Paykull, 1789)

Species of beetle

Falagria sulcata is a species of rove beetle in the family Staphylinidae. It is found in North America and Europe.
