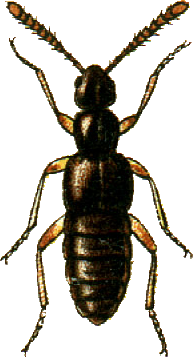

Scientific classification
- Kingdom: Animalia
- Phylum: Arthropoda
- Class: Insecta
- Order: Coleoptera
- Suborder: Polyphaga
- Infraorder: Staphyliniformia
- Family: Staphylinidae
- Genus: Cordalia
- Species: C. obscura

Binomial name
- Cordalia obscura (Gravenhorst, 1802)

= Cordalia obscura =

Species of beetle

Cordalia obscura is a species of rove beetle in the family Staphylinidae. It is found in Europe and Northern Asia (excluding China) and North America.
