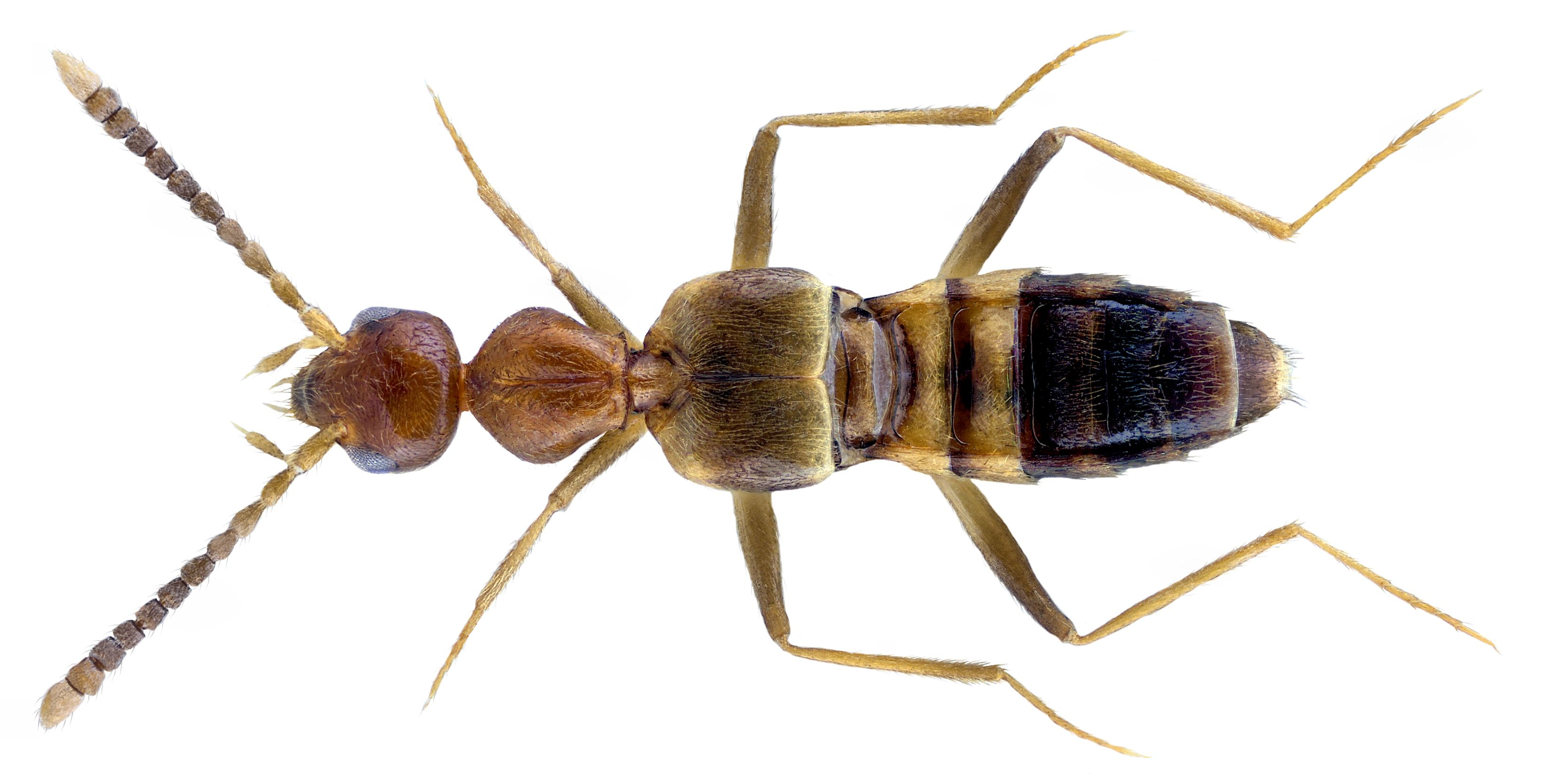

Scientific classification
- Kingdom: Animalia
- Phylum: Arthropoda
- Class: Insecta
- Order: Coleoptera
- Suborder: Polyphaga
- Infraorder: Staphyliniformia
- Family: Staphylinidae
- Genus: Myrmecocephalus
- Species: M. concinnus

Binomial name
- Myrmecocephalus concinnus (Erichson, 1840)

Synonyms
- Falagria concinna Erichson, 1840

= Myrmecocephalus concinnus =

Species of beetle

Myrmecocephalus concinnus is a species of rove beetle in the family Staphylinidae. It is found in Africa, North America, Oceania, South America, Southern Asia, and Europe.
