= Aleodorus bilobatus =

Scientific classification
- Kingdom: Animalia
- Phylum: Arthropoda
- Class: Insecta
- Order: Coleoptera
- Suborder: Polyphaga
- Infraorder: Staphyliniformia
- Family: Staphylinidae
- Genus: Aleodorus
- Species: A. bilobatus

Binomial name
- Aleodorus bilobatus (Say, 1830)

Synonyms
- Aleochara bilobata Say, 1830

Species of beetle

Aleodorus bilobatus is a species of rove beetle in the family Staphylinidae. It is found in eastern North America and inhabits wet biotopes such as vegetation along rivers or ditches.

Aleodorus bilobatus measure 2.8–4.1 mm (0.11–0.16 in) and are light to dark piceous-brown or piceous-black in color.
