= Falagria =

Scientific classification
- Kingdom: Animalia
- Phylum: Arthropoda
- Class: Insecta
- Order: Coleoptera
- Suborder: Polyphaga
- Infraorder: Staphyliniformia
- Family: Staphylinidae
- Tribe: Falagriini
- Genus: Falagria; Leach, 1819

Genus of beetles

Falagria is a genus of rove beetles in the family Staphylinidae. There are more than 30 described species in Falagria.

== Species ==
These 32 species belong to the genus Falagria:

- Falagria alutipennis Cameron, 1939
- Falagria angulata Casey
- Falagria brevisulcus Pace, 2008
- Falagria caesa Erichson, 1837
- Falagria cingulata LeConte, 1866
- Falagria coarcticollis Fauvel, 1898
- Falagria cribata Pace, 1984
- Falagria currax Sharp, 1880
- Falagria dissecta Erichson, 1840
- Falagria furoris Pace, 2008
- Falagria infima Sharp, 1883
- Falagria inornata Sharp, 1883
- Falagria iowana Casey
- Falagria ithacana Casey
- Falagria latesulcata Cameron, 1939
- Falagria myrmecolucida Pace, 2008
- Falagria neozealandicola Pace, 2015
- Falagria nitidula Sharp, 1883
- Falagria pallipennis Cameron, 1939
- Falagria peinantamontis Pace, 2008
- Falagria quadrata Sharp, 1883
- Falagria schawalleri Coiffait
- Falagria seminitens Cameron, 1933
- Falagria splendens Kraatz, 1858
- Falagria sterilis Casey
- Falagria subsimilis Casey
- Falagria sulcata (Paykull, 1789)
- Falagria sulcatula (Gravenhorst, 1806)
- Falagria taiwaelegans Pace, 2008
- Falagria taiwarorida Pace, 2008
- Falagria texana Casey
- Falagria tranquillitatis Pace, 2008
