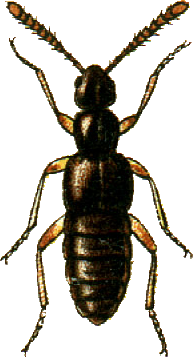
- Cordalia obscura

Scientific classification
- Kingdom: Animalia
- Phylum: Arthropoda
- Class: Insecta
- Order: Coleoptera
- Suborder: Polyphaga
- Infraorder: Staphyliniformia
- Family: Staphylinidae
- Tribe: Falagriini
- Genus: Cordalia; Jacobs, 1925

= Cordalia =

Genus of rove beetles

Cordalia is an extant genus of aleocharine rove beetle in the tribe Falagriini. It was discovered by Jacobs.

== Species ==
These three species belong to the genus Cordalia:

- Cordalia obscura (Gravenhorst, 1802)^{i c g b}
- Cordalia permutata Assing, 2002^{g}
- Cordalia taiwanensis Pace, 2008^{g}

Data sources: i = ITIS, c = Catalogue of Life, g = GBIF, b = Bugguide.net
