= Lissagria =

Scientific classification
- Kingdom: Animalia
- Phylum: Arthropoda
- Class: Insecta
- Order: Coleoptera
- Suborder: Polyphaga
- Infraorder: Staphyliniformia
- Family: Staphylinidae
- Tribe: Falagriini
- Genus: Lissagria; Casey, 1906

Genus of beetles

Lissagria is a genus of rove beetles in the family Staphylinidae. There are about eight described species in Lissagria.

== Species ==
These eight species belong to the genus Lissagria:

- Lissagria fissilis Casey
- Lissagria foveolata Eldredge
- Lissagria impressifrons Casey
- Lissagria laeviuscula (LeConte, 1866)
- Lissagria laticeps (Notman, 1920)
- Lissagria longicollis Casey
- Lissagria minuscula Casey
- Lissagria robusta Casey
