= Falagria dissecta =

Scientific classification
- Kingdom: Animalia
- Phylum: Arthropoda
- Class: Insecta
- Order: Coleoptera
- Suborder: Polyphaga
- Infraorder: Staphyliniformia
- Family: Staphylinidae
- Genus: Falagria
- Species: F. dissecta

Binomial name
- Falagria dissecta Erichson, 1840

Species of beetle

Falagria dissecta is a species of rove beetle in the family Staphylinidae. It is found in North America.
