= Aleodorus intricatus =

Scientific classification
- Kingdom: Animalia
- Phylum: Arthropoda
- Class: Insecta
- Order: Coleoptera
- Suborder: Polyphaga
- Infraorder: Staphyliniformia
- Family: Staphylinidae
- Genus: Aleodorus
- Species: A. intricatus

Binomial name
- Aleodorus intricatus (Casey, 1906)

Species of beetle

Aleodorus intricatus is a species of rove beetle in the family Staphylinidae. It is found in western North America from Arizona and New Mexico (USA) to southern Alberta and Saskatchewan (Canada).

Aleodorus intricatus measure 3.1–4.1 mm (0.12–0.16 in) and are uniformly light to dark brownish-testaceous in color.
