= Philotermitini =

Scientific classification
- Kingdom: Animalia
- Phylum: Arthropoda
- Clade: Pancrustacea
- Class: Insecta
- Order: Coleoptera
- Suborder: Polyphaga
- Infraorder: Staphyliniformia
- Family: Staphylinidae
- Subfamily: Aleocharinae
- Genus: Philotermitini; Seevers, 1957

Tribe of beetles

Philotermitini is a tribe of rove beetles in the subfamily Aleocharinae. It was first described by Seevers in 1957. It contains 2 genera and 12 species.

== Genera and species ==
- Philotermes
  - Philotermes cubitopilis
  - Philotermes emersoni
  - Philotermes fuchsii
  - Philotermes howardi
  - Philotermes pensylvanicus
  - Philotermes pilosus
  - Philotermes werneri
- Pseudophilotermes
  - Pseudophilotermes bruchi
  - Pseudophilotermes costaricensis
  - Pseudophilotermes dybasi
  - Pseudophilotermes laxicornis
  - Pseudophilotermes mcmahanae
