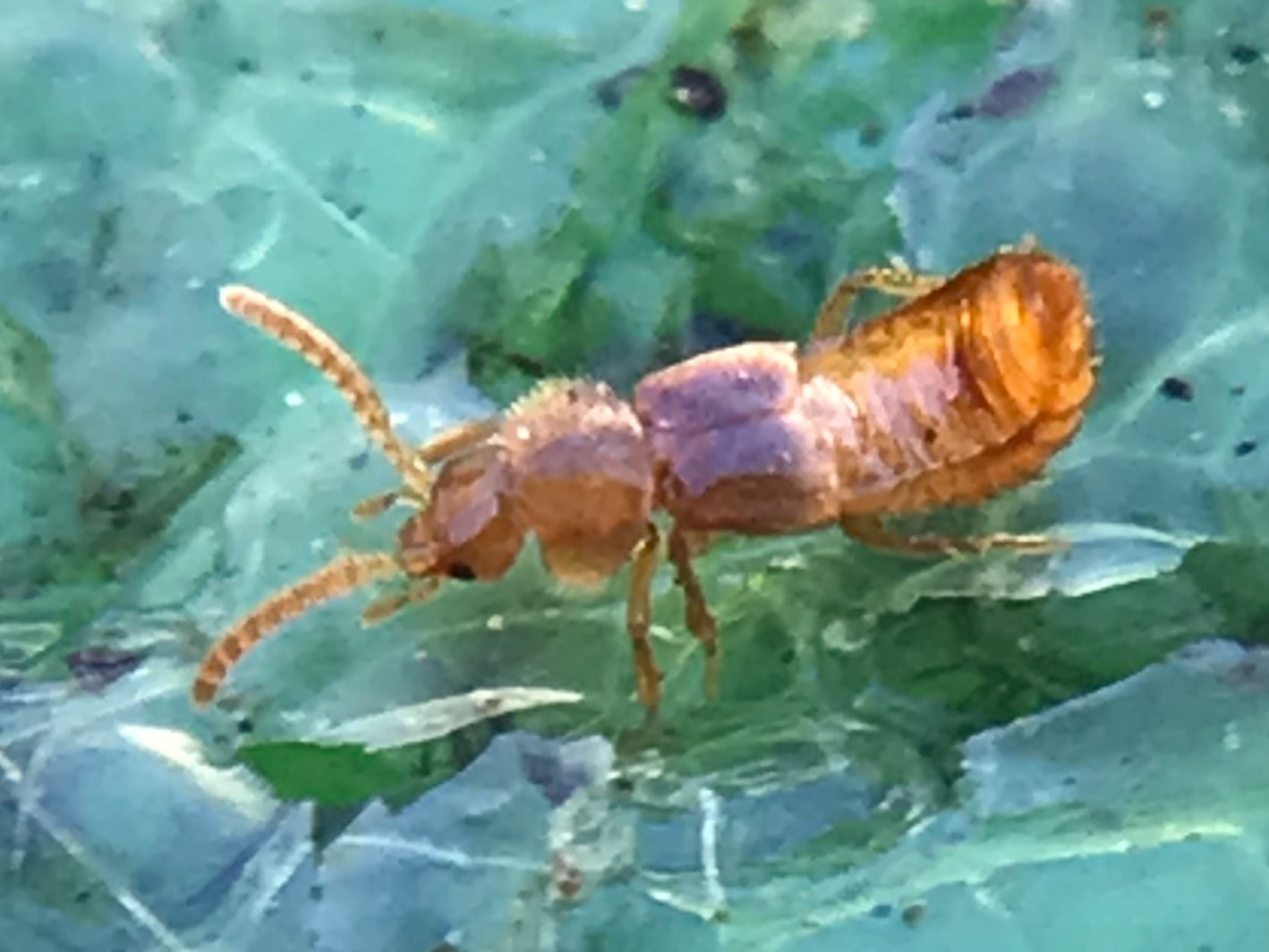

Scientific classification
- Kingdom: Animalia
- Phylum: Arthropoda
- Clade: Pancrustacea
- Class: Insecta
- Order: Coleoptera
- Suborder: Polyphaga
- Infraorder: Staphyliniformia
- Family: Staphylinidae
- Subfamily: Aleocharinae
- Tribe: Philotermitini
- Genus: Philotermes; Kraatz, 1857

= Philotermes =

Genus of beetles

Philotermes is a genus of rove beetles in the family Staphylinidae. There are about seven described species in the genus Philotermes.

== Species ==
These seven species belong to the genus Philotermes:

- Philotermes cubitopilis Seevers, 1957
- Philotermes emersoni Seevers, 1938
- Philotermes fuchsii Kraatz, 1857
- Philotermes laxicornis Sharp, 1883
- Philotermes pennsylvanicus Kraatz, 1857
- Philotermes pilosus Kraatz, 1857
- Philotermes werneri Seevers, 1957
