= Philotermes pilosus =

Scientific classification
- Kingdom: Animalia
- Phylum: Arthropoda
- Class: Insecta
- Order: Coleoptera
- Suborder: Polyphaga
- Infraorder: Staphyliniformia
- Family: Staphylinidae
- Genus: Philotermes
- Species: P. pilosus

Binomial name
- Philotermes pilosus Kraatz, 1857

Species of beetle

Philotermes pilosus is a species of rove beetle in the family Staphylinidae. It is found in North America.
