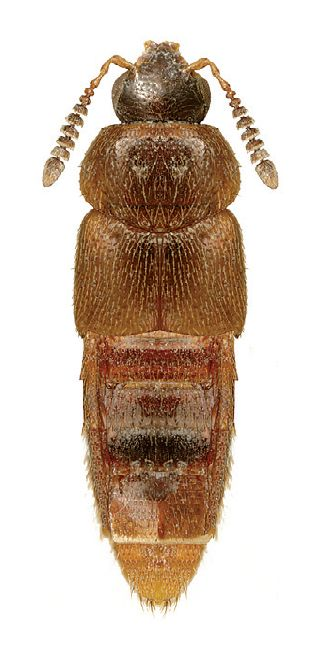

Scientific classification
- Kingdom: Animalia
- Phylum: Arthropoda
- Class: Insecta
- Order: Coleoptera
- Suborder: Polyphaga
- Infraorder: Staphyliniformia
- Family: Staphylinidae
- Genus: Hoplandria
- Species: H. lateralis

Binomial name
- Hoplandria lateralis (Melsheimer, 1844)

= Hoplandria lateralis =

Species of beetle

Hoplandria lateralis is a species of rove beetle in the family Staphylinidae. It is found in Central America, North America, and South America.
