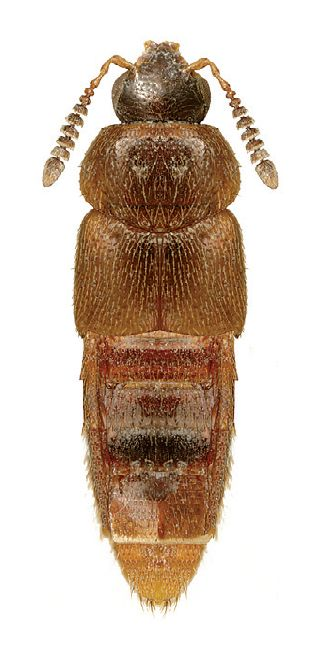
- Hoplandria lateralis

Scientific classification
- Kingdom: Animalia
- Phylum: Arthropoda
- Class: Insecta
- Order: Coleoptera
- Suborder: Polyphaga
- Infraorder: Staphyliniformia
- Family: Staphylinidae
- Tribe: Hoplandriini
- Subtribe: Hoplandriina
- Genus: Hoplandria; Kraatz, 1857

= Hoplandria =

Genus of beetles

Hoplandria is a genus of rove beetles in the family Staphylinidae. There are about 13 described species in Hoplandria.

== Species ==
These 13 species belong to the genus Hoplandria:

- Hoplandria alternans Génier, 1989^{i c g}
- Hoplandria guadeloupensis Pace, 1987^{g}
- Hoplandria isabellae Génier, 1989^{i c g}
- Hoplandria kisatchie Génier, 1989^{i c g}
- Hoplandria klimaszewskii Génier, 1989^{i c g}
- Hoplandria laevicollis (Notman, 1920)^{i c g}
- Hoplandria laeviventris Casey, 1910^{i c g}
- Hoplandria lateralis (Melsheimer, 1844)^{i c g b}
- Hoplandria oconee Génier, 1989^{i c g}
- Hoplandria okaloosa Génier, 1989^{i c g}
- Hoplandria pulchra Kraatz, 1857^{i c g}
- Hoplandria sanbornei Génier, 1989^{i c g}
- Hoplandria smetanai Génier, 1989^{i c g}

Data sources: i = ITIS, c = Catalogue of Life, g = GBIF, b = Bugguide.net
