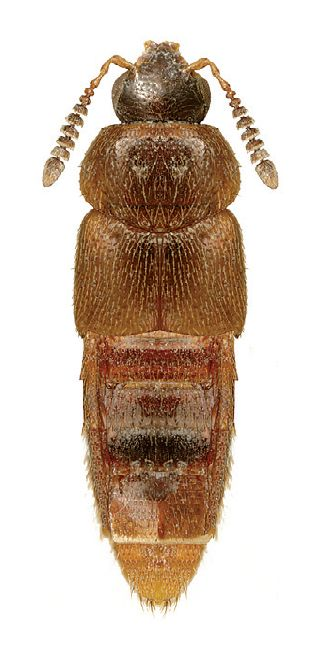
- Hoplandria lateralis

Scientific classification
- Kingdom: Animalia
- Phylum: Arthropoda
- Clade: Pancrustacea
- Class: Insecta
- Order: Coleoptera
- Suborder: Polyphaga
- Infraorder: Staphyliniformia
- Family: Staphylinidae
- Subfamily: Aleocharinae
- Tribe: Hoplandriini; Casey, 1910

= Hoplandriini =

Tribe of beetles

Hoplandriini is a tribe of rove beetles in the family Staphylinidae. There are at least 5 genera and 21 described species in Hoplandriini.

== Genera ==
These five genera belong to the tribe Hoplandriini:

- Hoplandria Kraatz, 1857^{i c g b}
- Microlia Casey, 1910^{i c g b}
- Platandria Casey, 1893^{i c g b}
- Pseudoplandria Fenyes, 1921^{c g}
- Tetrallus Bernhauer, 1905^{i c g}

Data sources: i = ITIS, c = Catalogue of Life, g = GBIF, b = Bugguide.net
