= Crematoxenini =

Scientific classification
- Kingdom: Animalia
- Phylum: Arthropoda
- Class: Insecta
- Order: Coleoptera
- Suborder: Polyphaga
- Infraorder: Staphyliniformia
- Family: Staphylinidae
- Subfamily: Aleocharinae
- Tribe: Crematoxenini; Mann, 1921

Tribe of beetles

Crematoxenini is a tribe of rove beetles in the family Staphylinidae. There are eleven genera and about eighteen described species in Crematoxenini.

== Genera ==
These eleven genera belong to the tribe Crematoxenini:

- Beyeria Fenyes, 1910^{i c g b}
- Crematoxenus Mann, 1921
- Cryptomimus Reichensperger, 1926
- Diploeciton Wasmann, 1923
- Ecitosius Seevers, 1965
- Ecitotima Seevers, 1965
- Neivaphilus Jacobson & Kistner, 1992
- Neobeyeria Jacobson, Kistner & Abdel-Galil, 1987^{i c g b}
- Philacamatus Bruch, 1933
- Probeyeria Seevers, 1965^{i c g}
- Pulicomorpha Mann, 1924^{i c g}

Data sources: i = ITIS, c = Catalogue of Life, g = GBIF, b = Bugguide.net
