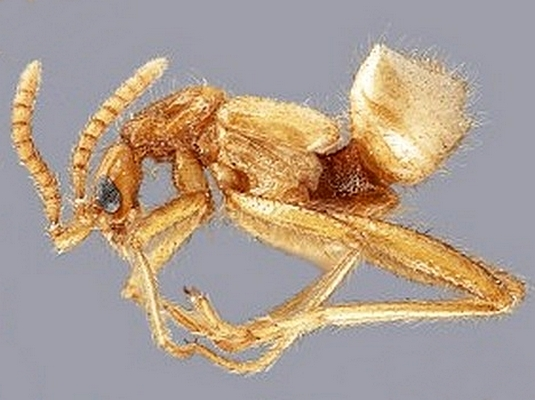

Scientific classification
- Kingdom: Animalia
- Phylum: Arthropoda
- Class: Insecta
- Order: Coleoptera
- Suborder: Polyphaga
- Infraorder: Staphyliniformia
- Family: Staphylinidae
- Genus: Beyeria
- Species: B. vespa

Binomial name
- Beyeria vespa Fenyes, 1910

= Beyeria vespa =

Species of beetle

Beyeria vespa is a species of rove beetle in the family Staphylinidae. It is found in North America.
