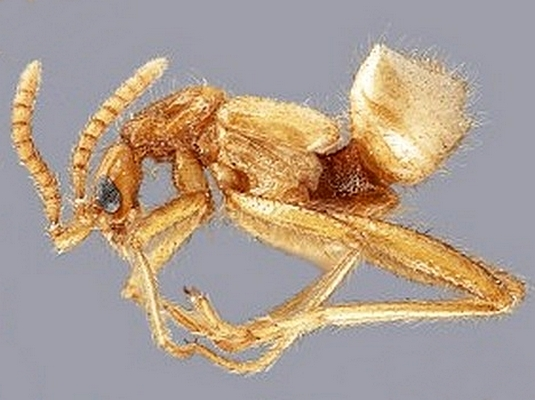
- Beyeria vespa

Scientific classification
- Kingdom: Animalia
- Phylum: Arthropoda
- Class: Insecta
- Order: Coleoptera
- Suborder: Polyphaga
- Infraorder: Staphyliniformia
- Family: Staphylinidae
- Subfamily: Aleocharinae
- Tribe: Crematoxenini
- Genus: Beyeria; Fenyes, 1910

= Beyeria (beetle) =

Genus of beetles

Beyeria is a genus of rove beetles in the family Staphylinidae. There are at least two described species in Beyeria.

== Species ==
These two species belong to the genus Beyeria:

- Beyeria pax Jacobson, Kistner and Abdel-Galil, 1987^{i c g}
- Beyeria vespa Fenyes, 1910^{i c g b}

Data sources: i = ITIS, c = Catalogue of Life, g = GBIF, b = Bugguide.net
