= Neobeyeria =

Scientific classification
- Kingdom: Animalia
- Phylum: Arthropoda
- Class: Insecta
- Order: Coleoptera
- Suborder: Polyphaga
- Infraorder: Staphyliniformia
- Family: Staphylinidae
- Tribe: Crematoxenini
- Genus: Neobeyeria; Jacobson, Kistner, & Abdel-Galil, 1987

Genus of beetles

Neobeyeria is a genus of rove beetles in the family Staphylinidae. There is one described species in Neobeyeria, N. arizonensis.
