= Sceptobius lativentris =

Scientific classification
- Kingdom: Animalia
- Phylum: Arthropoda
- Class: Insecta
- Order: Coleoptera
- Suborder: Polyphaga
- Infraorder: Staphyliniformia
- Family: Staphylinidae
- Tribe: Sceptobiini
- Genus: Sceptobius
- Species: S. lativentris

Binomial name
- Sceptobius lativentris (Fenyes, 1909)

Species of beetle

Sceptobius lativentris is a species of rove beetle in the family Staphylinidae. It is found in Central America and North America.
