= Dinardilla liometopi =

Scientific classification
- Kingdom: Animalia
- Phylum: Arthropoda
- Class: Insecta
- Order: Coleoptera
- Suborder: Polyphaga
- Infraorder: Staphyliniformia
- Family: Staphylinidae
- Genus: Dinardilla
- Species: D. liometopi

Binomial name
- Dinardilla liometopi Wasmann, 1901

Species of beetle

Dinardilla liometopi is a species of rove beetle in the family Staphylinidae. It is found in Central America and North America.
