= Dinardilla =

Scientific classification
- Kingdom: Animalia
- Phylum: Arthropoda
- Class: Insecta
- Order: Coleoptera
- Suborder: Polyphaga
- Infraorder: Staphyliniformia
- Family: Staphylinidae
- Tribe: Sceptobiini
- Genus: Dinardilla; Wasmann, 1901

Genus of beetles

Dinardilla is a genus of rove beetles in the family Staphylinidae. There are at least two described species in Dinardilla.

== Species ==
These two species belong to the genus Dinardilla:

- Dinardilla liometopi Wasmann, 1901
- Dinardilla mexicana Mann, 1914
