= Sceptobius dispar =

Scientific classification
- Kingdom: Animalia
- Phylum: Arthropoda
- Class: Insecta
- Order: Coleoptera
- Suborder: Polyphaga
- Infraorder: Staphyliniformia
- Family: Staphylinidae
- Genus: Sceptobius
- Species: S. dispar

Binomial name
- Sceptobius dispar Sharp, 1883

Species of beetle

Sceptobius dispar is a species of rove beetle in the family Staphylinidae. It is found in Central America and North America.
