= Sceptobius =

Scientific classification
- Kingdom: Animalia
- Phylum: Arthropoda
- Class: Insecta
- Order: Coleoptera
- Suborder: Polyphaga
- Infraorder: Staphyliniformia
- Family: Staphylinidae
- Tribe: Sceptobiini
- Genus: Sceptobius; Sharp, 1883

Genus of beetles

Sceptobius is a genus of rove beetles in the family Staphylinidae. There are at least three described species in Sceptobius.

== Species ==
These three species belong to the genus Sceptobius:

- Sceptobius dispar Sharp, 1883
- Sceptobius lativentris (Fenyes, 1909)
- Sceptobius schmitti (Wasmann, 1901)
