= Sceptobiini =

Scientific classification
- Kingdom: Animalia
- Phylum: Arthropoda
- Class: Insecta
- Order: Coleoptera
- Suborder: Polyphaga
- Infraorder: Staphyliniformia
- Family: Staphylinidae
- Subfamily: Aleocharinae
- Tribe: Sceptobiini; Seevers, 1978

Tribe of beetles

Sceptobiini is a tribe of rove beetles in the Staphylinidae family. There are at least two genera and about five described species in Sceptobiini.

== Genera ==
These two genera belong to the tribe Sceptobiini:

- Dinardilla Wasmann, 1901
- Sceptobius Sharp, 1883
