= Dioxeuta =

Scientific classification
- Kingdom: Animalia
- Phylum: Arthropoda
- Clade: Pancrustacea
- Class: Insecta
- Order: Coleoptera
- Suborder: Polyphaga
- Infraorder: Staphyliniformia
- Family: Staphylinidae
- Subfamily: Aleocharinae
- Tribe: Termitopaediini
- Genus: Dioxeuta; Sharp, 1899

Genus of beetles

Dioxeuta is a genus of aleocharine rove beetle in the tribe Termitopaediini.

Species include:

- Dioxeuta negaricus
- Dioxeuta sinensis
- Dioxeuta yunnanensis
