= Termitopaediini =

Scientific classification
- Kingdom: Animalia
- Phylum: Arthropoda
- Class: Insecta
- Order: Coleoptera
- Suborder: Polyphaga
- Infraorder: Staphyliniformia
- Family: Staphylinidae
- Subfamily: Aleocharinae
- Tribe: Termitopaediini

Tribe of beetles

Termitopaediini is a tribe in the rove beetle subfamily Aleocharinae. Much of it was classified and documented by Kistner in 1977.

Below are a list of some of the genera this tribe contains:

- Coatonipulex Kistner, 1977
- Dioxeuta
- Macrotermophila
- Macrotoxenus
- Paratermitopulex Kistner, 1977
- Physomilitaris Kistner, 1977
- Polyteinia
- Protermitobia
- Termitobia
- Termitolinus
- Termitonda
- Termitopaedia
- Termitopulex
- Termitotecna
- Termitotropha
- Termozyras
