= Termitopaedia =

Scientific classification
- Kingdom: Animalia
- Phylum: Arthropoda
- Class: Insecta
- Order: Coleoptera
- Suborder: Polyphaga
- Infraorder: Staphyliniformia
- Family: Staphylinidae
- Subfamily: Aleocharinae
- Tribe: Termitopaediini
- Genus: Termitopaedia; Wasmann, 1911

Genus of beetles

Termitopaedia is a genus of Aleocharinae in the tribe Termitopaediini.
