= Protermitobia =

Scientific classification
- Kingdom: Animalia
- Phylum: Arthropoda
- Clade: Pancrustacea
- Class: Insecta
- Order: Coleoptera
- Suborder: Polyphaga
- Infraorder: Staphyliniformia
- Family: Staphylinidae
- Subfamily: Aleocharinae
- Tribe: Termitopaediini
- Genus: Protermitobia; Seevers, 1957

Genus of beetles

Protermitobia is a aleocharine genus in the tribe Termitopaediini.
