= Brachida hatayana =

Scientific classification
- Kingdom: Animalia
- Phylum: Arthropoda
- Class: Insecta
- Order: Coleoptera
- Suborder: Polyphaga
- Infraorder: Staphyliniformia
- Family: Staphylinidae
- Genus: Brachida
- Species: B. hatayana

Binomial name
- Brachida hatayana Assing, 2010

Species of beetle

Brachida hatayana is a species of rove beetles first found in Turkey.
