= Brachida =

Scientific classification
- Kingdom: Animalia
- Phylum: Arthropoda
- Class: Insecta
- Order: Coleoptera
- Suborder: Polyphaga
- Infraorder: Staphyliniformia
- Family: Staphylinidae
- Subfamily: Aleocharinae
- Genus: Brachida; Mulsant and Rey, 1871

Genus of beetle

Brachida is a genus of rove beetles first described in 1871.

== Selected species ==
- Brachida exigua Heer, 1839
- Brachida hatayana Assing, 2010
- Brachida kraatzii Hochhuth, 1872
