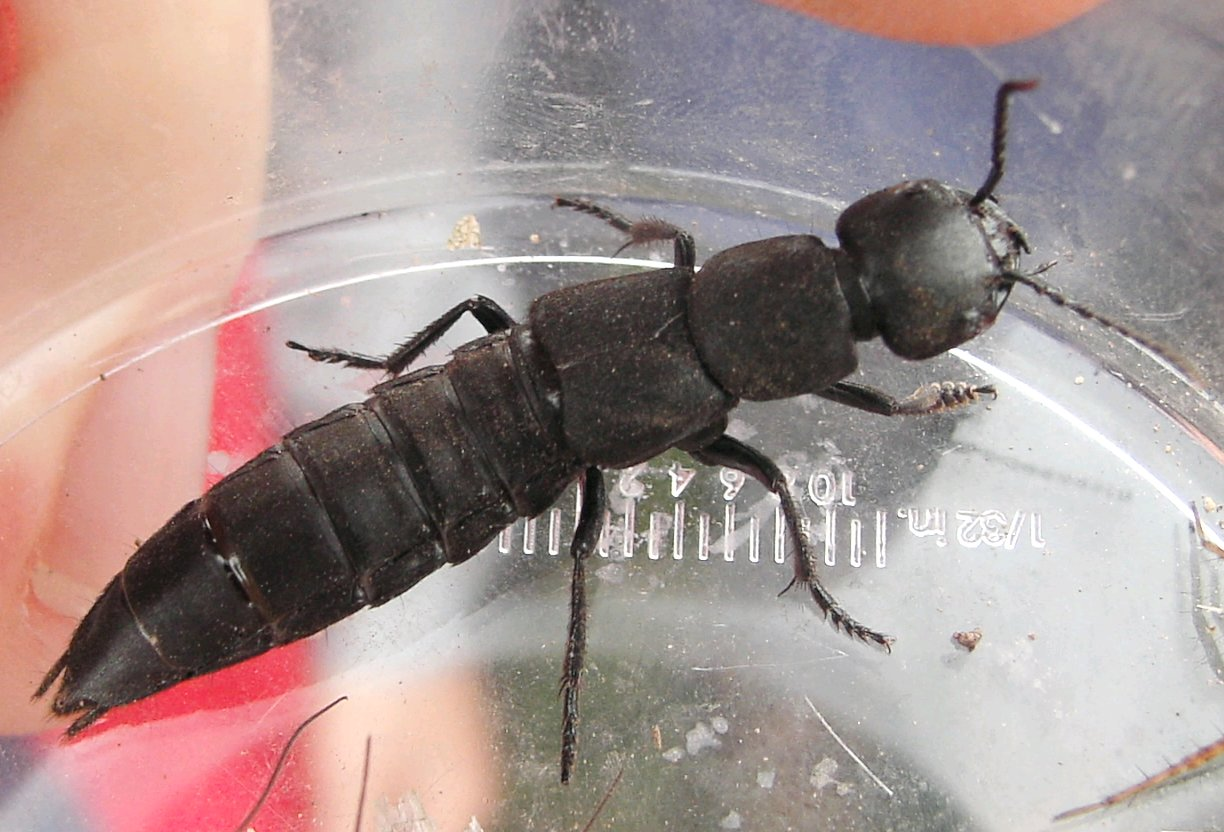
- Devil's coach horse beetle, Ocypus olens (Staphylinidae)

Scientific classification
- Kingdom: Animalia
- Phylum: Arthropoda
- Clade: Pancrustacea
- Class: Insecta
- Order: Coleoptera
- Suborder: Polyphaga
- Infraorder: Staphyliniformia
- Superfamily: Staphylinoidea; Latreille, 1802

= Staphylinoidea =

Staphylinoidea Temporal range: Rhaetian–Recent

Superfamily of beetles

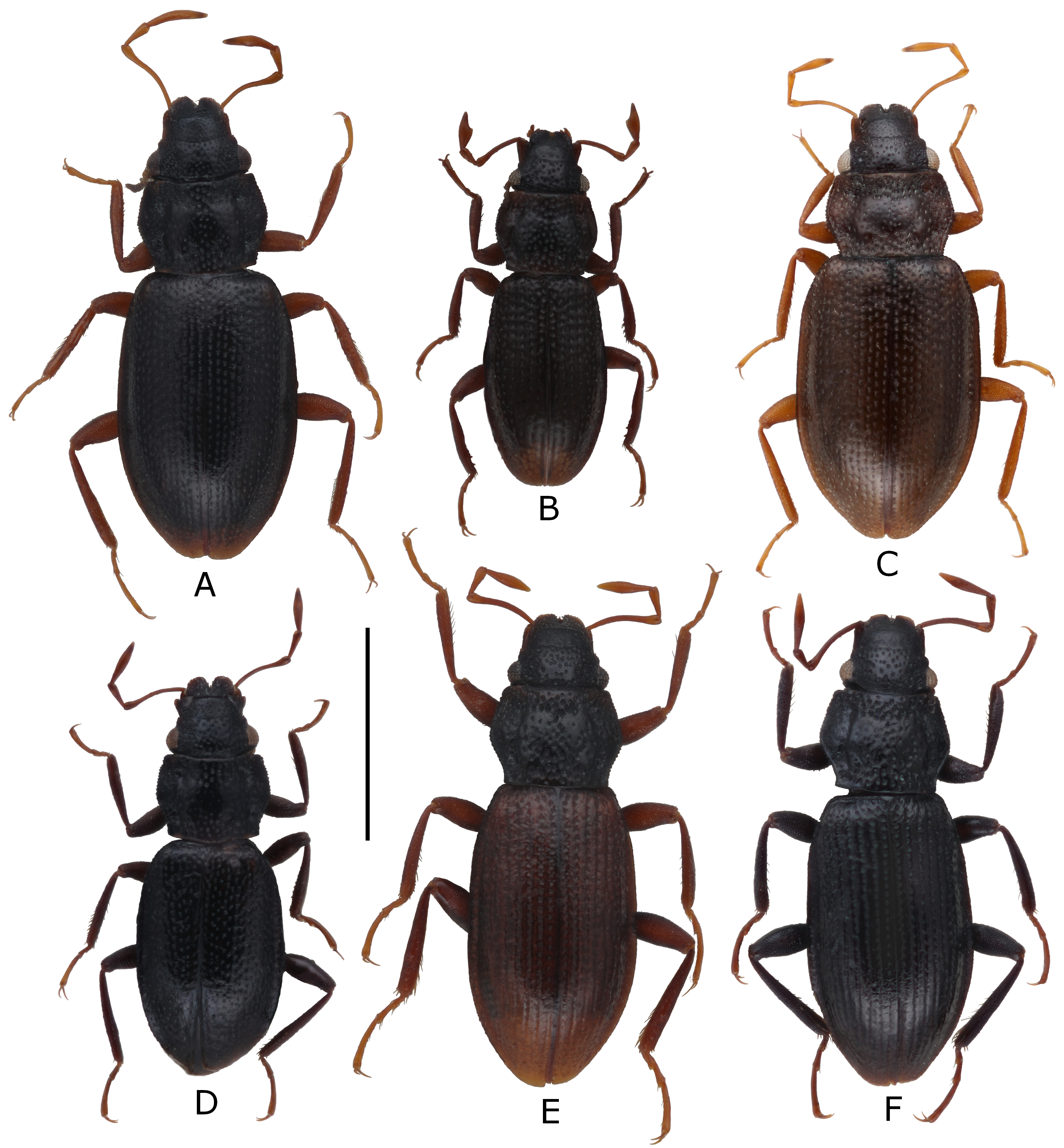
Some species of Hydraena (Hydraenidae)

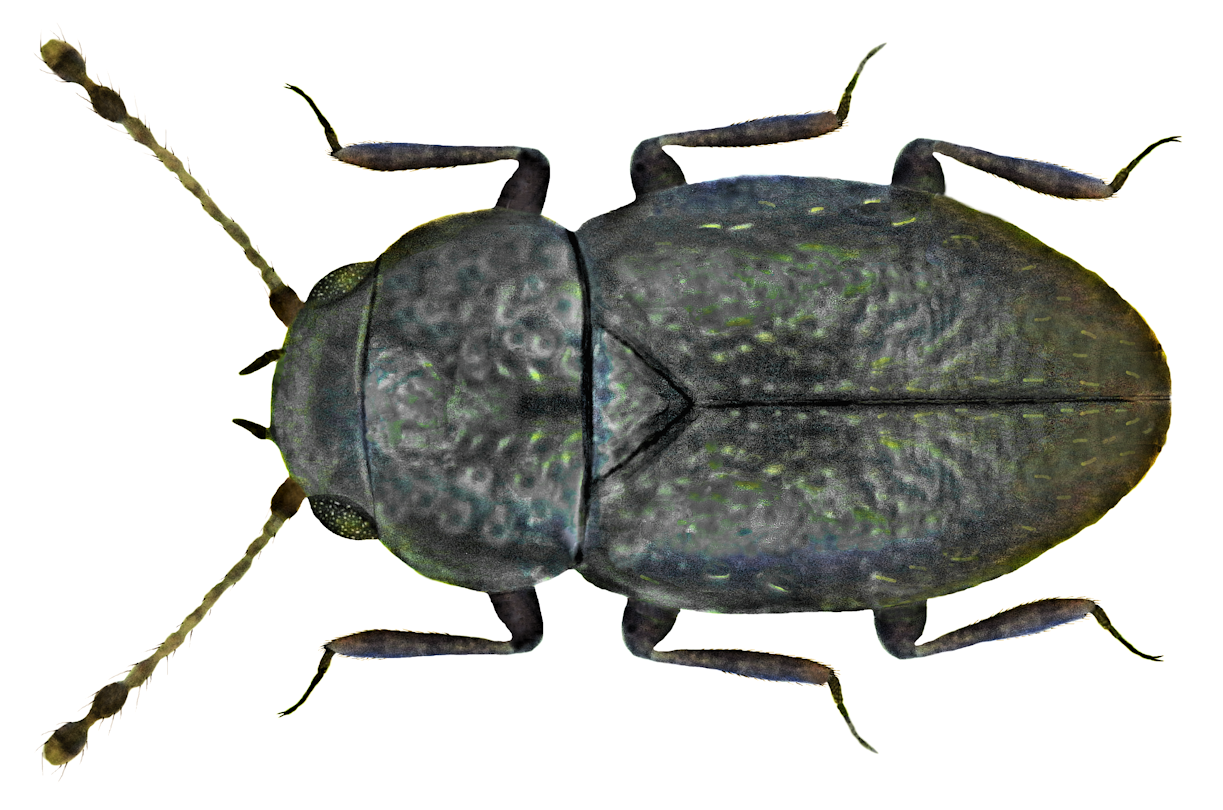
Ptenidium punctatum (Ptiliidae)

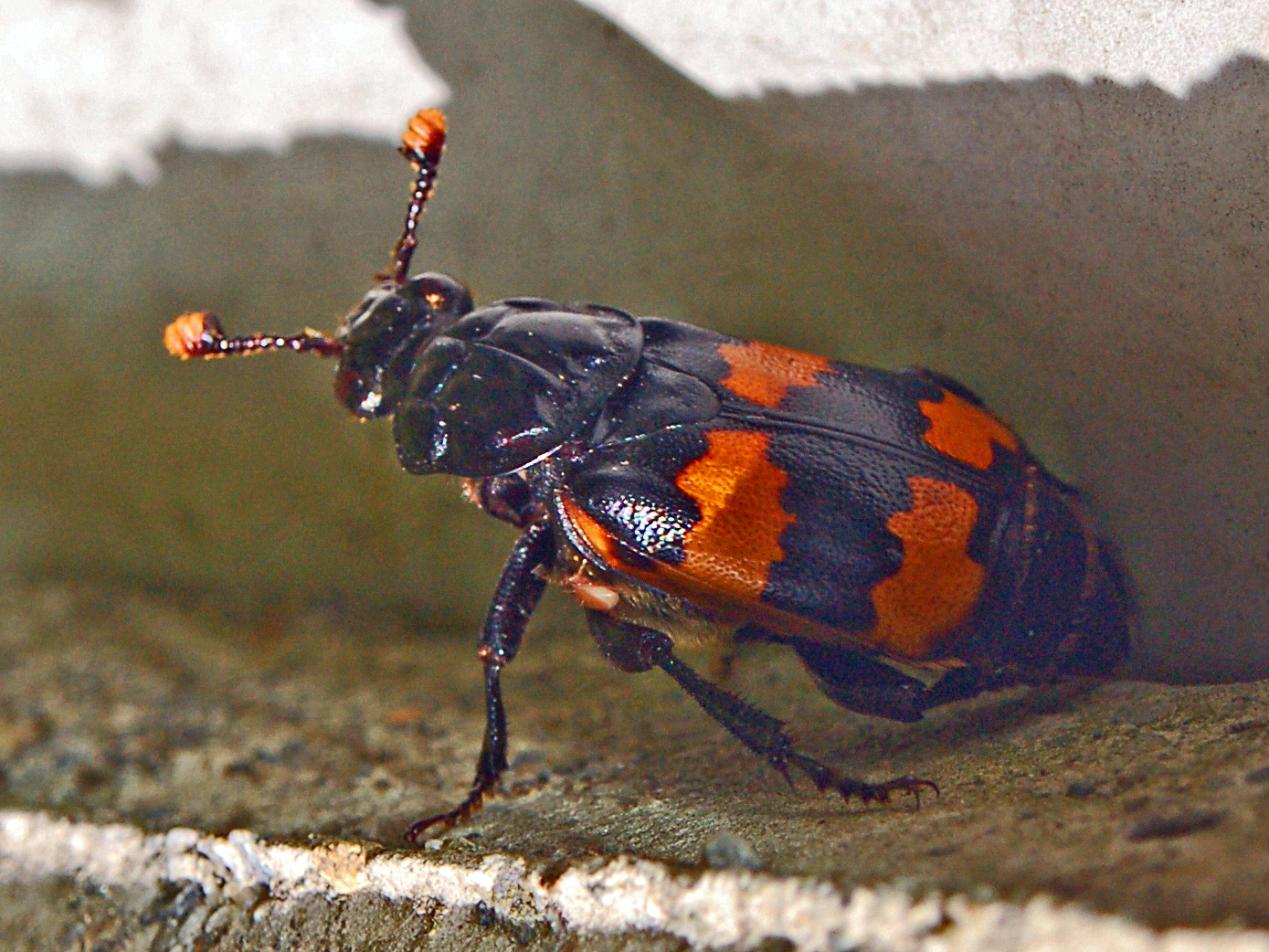
Nicrophorus interruptus (Silphidae)

Staphylinoidea is a superfamily of beetles. It is a very large and diverse group with worldwide distribution.

== Description ==
Adult staphylinoids are generally small beetles no more than a few millimetres long, though Staphylinidae can reach 50 mm long and Silphidae can reach 45 mm. The superfamily includes the smallest beetles (and the smallest of all non-parasitic insects) in family Ptiliidae. Most Ptiliidae do not exceed 1 mm long as adults, while the smallest species is just 325 μm long.

Adults can be recognised by the hind wings having no accessory posterior ridge (locking device), no medial loop, no wedge cell and no apical hinge. The 8th segment of the abdomen is not entirely invaginated within the 7th. The head usually lacks a coronal suture (rarely with a short, rudimentary suture).

Larval staphylinoids have 3-segmented (rarely 4-segmented) maxillary palps with distinct (often fused) galia and lacinia. The body usually has well-developed tergites and sternites. The spiracles are annular or annular-biforous. There are no epistomal lobes.

== Systematics and evolution ==
Staphylinoidea contains the following subgroups:

- Family Agyrtidae C.G. Thomson 1859 (primitive carrion beetles)
  - Subfamily Agyrtinae Thomson, 1859
  - Subfamily Necrophilinae Newton, 1997
  - Subfamily Pterolomatinae Thomson, 1862
- Family Jacobsoniidae Heller, 1926
- Family Hydraenidae Mulsant 1844 (minute moss beetles)
  - Subfamily Hydraeninae Mulsant, 1844
  - Subfamily Ochthebiinae C. G. Thomson, 1860
  - Subfamily Orchymontiinae Perkins, 1997
  - Subfamily Prosthetopinae Perkins, 1994
- Family Leiodidae Fleming 1821 (round fungus beetles)
  - Subfamily Camiarinae Jeannel, 1911
  - Subfamily Catopocerinae Hatch, 1927
  - Subfamily Cholevinae Kirby, 1837
  - Subfamily Coloninae Horn, 1880
  - Subfamily Leiodinae Fleming, 1821
  - Subfamily Platypsyllinae Ritsema, 1869
- Family Ptiliidae Erichson 1845 (featherwing beetles)
  - Subfamily Acrotrichinae Reitter, 1909
  - Subfamily Cephaloplectinae Sharp, 1883
  - Subfamily Nanosellinae Barber, 1924
  - Subfamily Ptiliinae Erichson, 1845
- Family Silphidae Latreille 1807 (carrion beetles)
  - Subfamily Nicrophorinae Kirby, 1837
  - Subfamily Silphinae Latreille, 1806
- Family Staphylinidae Latreille 1802 (rove beetles)
  - Subfamily Aleocharinae Fleming, 1821
  - Subfamily Apateticinae Fauvel, 1895
  - Subfamily Dasycerinae Reitter, 1887
  - Subfamily Empelinae Newton and Thayer, 1992
  - Subfamily Euaesthetinae Thomson, 1859
  - Subfamily Glypholomatinae Jeannel, 1962
  - Subfamily Habrocerinae Mulsant and Rey, 1876
  - Subfamily Leptotyphlinae Fauvel, 1874
  - Subfamily Megalopsidiinae Leng, 1920
  - Subfamily Micropeplinae Leach, 1815
  - Subfamily Microsilphinae Crowson, 1950
  - Subfamily Neophoninae Fauvel, 1905
  - Subfamily Olisthaerinae Thomson, 1858
  - Subfamily Omaliinae MacLeay, 1825
  - Subfamily Osoriinae Erichson, 1839
  - Subfamily Oxyporinae Fleming, 1821
  - Subfamily Oxytelinae Fleming, 1821
  - Subfamily Paederinae Fleming, 1821
  - Subfamily Phloeocharinae Erichson, 1839
  - Subfamily Piestinae Erichson, 1839
  - Subfamily Proteininae Erichson, 1839
  - Subfamily Protopselaphinae Newton and Thayer, 1995
  - Subfamily Pselaphinae Latreille, 1802
  - Subfamily Pseudopsinae Ganglbauer, 1895
  - Subfamily Scaphidiinae Latreille, 1806
  - Subfamily Scydmaeninae Leach, 1815
  - Subfamily Solieriinae Newton and Thayer, 1992
  - Subfamily Staphylininae Latreille, 1802
  - Subfamily Steninae MacLeay, 1825
  - Subfamily Tachyporinae MacLeay, 1825
  - Subfamily Trichophyinae Thomson, 1858
  - Subfamily Trigonurinae Reiche, 1866
  - † Subfamily Protactinae Heer, 1847

The unambiguous fossil record dates back to Triassic, and an early Mesozoic origin of the group is probable.

== Phylogeny ==
A 2019 molecular phylogenetic study confirmed the monophyly of Ptilidae and found that it is sister group to Hydraenidae.
