= A. longulus =

A. longulus may refer to:

- Abacetus longulus, a ground beetle
- Agyrtes longulus, a primitive carrion beetle found in North America
- Ahasverus longulus, a silvan flat bark beetle found in North America
- Amblyseius longulus, a mite
