= Agyrtinae =

Scientific classification
- Kingdom: Animalia
- Phylum: Arthropoda
- Clade: Pancrustacea
- Class: Insecta
- Order: Coleoptera
- Suborder: Polyphaga
- Infraorder: Staphyliniformia
- Family: Agyrtidae
- Subfamily: Agyrtinae

Subfamily of beetles

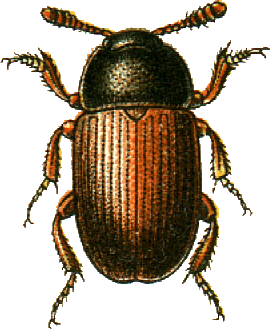
Image of Agyrtes

Agyrtinae is a subfamily in the family Agyrtidae. It contains four genera: Agyrtes (the type genus of the subfamily and the family), Ecanus, Ipelates and Lyrosoma.
