= Ipelates latus =

Scientific classification
- Domain: Eukaryota
- Kingdom: Animalia
- Phylum: Arthropoda
- Class: Insecta
- Order: Coleoptera
- Suborder: Polyphaga
- Infraorder: Staphyliniformia
- Family: Agyrtidae
- Genus: Ipelates
- Species: I. latus

Binomial name
- Ipelates latus (Mannerheim, 1852)

Species of beetle

Ipelates latus is a species of primitive carrion beetle in the family Agyrtidae. It is found in North America.
