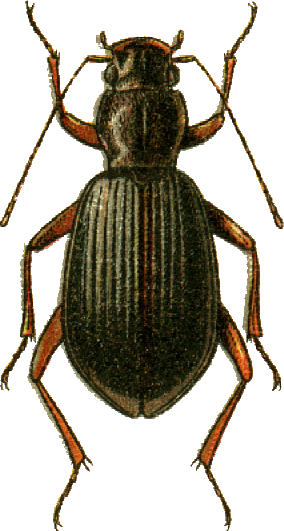

Scientific classification
- Domain: Eukaryota
- Kingdom: Animalia
- Phylum: Arthropoda
- Class: Insecta
- Order: Coleoptera
- Suborder: Polyphaga
- Infraorder: Staphyliniformia
- Family: Agyrtidae
- Genus: Lyrosoma
- Species: L. opacum

Binomial name
- Lyrosoma opacum Mannerheim, 1853

= Lyrosoma opacum =

Species of beetle

Lyrosoma opacum is a species of primitive carrion beetle in the family Agyrtidae. It is found in Europe and Northern Asia (excluding China) and North America.
