= Nodynus =

Scientific classification
- Kingdom: Animalia
- Phylum: Arthropoda
- Clade: Pancrustacea
- Class: Insecta
- Order: Coleoptera
- Suborder: Polyphaga
- Infraorder: Staphyliniformia
- Family: Staphylinidae
- Subfamily: Apateticinae
- Genus: Nodynus; Waterhouse, C. O., 1876

Genus of beetle

Nodynus is a genus of rove beetles.

There are eight species assigned to this genus:

- N. huapingensis Chang, Schillhammer & Tang, 2025
- N. kasaharai Hayashi, Y., 2002
- N. leucofasciatus Lewis, 1879
- N. nitidus Waterhouse, C. O., 1876
- N. rubrofasciatus Jansson, A., 1946
- N. silphoides Jansson, A., 1946
- N. unicolor Jansson, A., 1946
- N. yeren Rougemont, 2015
