= Pterolomatinae =

Scientific classification
- Kingdom: Animalia
- Phylum: Arthropoda
- Clade: Pancrustacea
- Class: Insecta
- Order: Coleoptera
- Suborder: Polyphaga
- Infraorder: Staphyliniformia
- Family: Agyrtidae
- Subfamily: Pterolomatinae; Thomson, 1862

Subfamily of beetles

Pterolomatinae is a subfamily of primitive carrion beetles in the family Agyrtidae. It was first described by C.G. Thomson in 1862. It contains 2 genera and 39 accepted species. The genera are Apteroloma and Pteroloma.

All recorded observations of members of Pterolomatinae have been made in the northern hemisphere. The majority have been made in Finland, Norway, Sweden, the United States, and Japan.
