= Trigonurus edwardsi =

Scientific classification
- Kingdom: Animalia
- Phylum: Arthropoda
- Class: Insecta
- Order: Coleoptera
- Suborder: Polyphaga
- Infraorder: Staphyliniformia
- Family: Staphylinidae
- Genus: Trigonurus
- Species: T. edwardsi

Binomial name
- Trigonurus edwardsi Sharp, 1875

Species of beetle

Trigonurus edwardsi is a species of rove beetle in the family Staphylinidae. It is found in North America.
