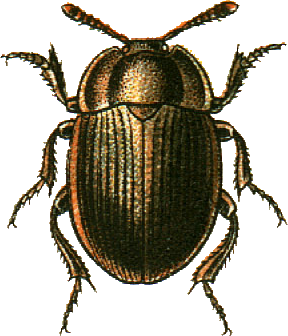
- Necrophilus subterraneus

Scientific classification
- Kingdom: Animalia
- Phylum: Arthropoda
- Clade: Pancrustacea
- Class: Insecta
- Order: Coleoptera
- Suborder: Polyphaga
- Infraorder: Staphyliniformia
- Family: Agyrtidae
- Subfamily: Necrophilinae; Newton, 1997

Synonyms
- Necrophilini Arnett, 1985; Necrophilini Jeannel, 1936

= Necrophilinae =

Subfamily of insects

Necrophilinae is a subfamily of primitive carrion beetles in the family Agyrtidae. It was first described by Alfred Francis Newton in 1997. They are only found in the Northern Hemisphere. Recorded observations have primarily been made in the United States, New Zealand, Austria, and Canada. In the United States, observations are concentrated along the western coast, with fewer in the eastern Midwest and southeast. Observations are made year-round, but peak in March.

The name Necrophilinae means "death-loving." They are saprotrophs, attracted to decaying matter, such as carrion, leaf little, and rotting fungi.

== Systemics ==
There are three genera in Necrophilinae, with one being extinct.

- Necrophilus Latreille, 1829
  - Necrophilus hydrophiloides
  - Necrophilus nomuari
  - Necrophilus pettitii
  - Necrophilus roderi
  - Necrophilus rupinensis
  - Necrophilus sichuanensis
  - Necrophilus subterraneus
- †Palaeonecrophilus Strelnikova, Yan & Vasilenko, 2020
- Zeanoecrophilus Newton, 1997
  - Zeancrophilus prolongatus
  - Zeanecrophilus thayerae
