= Necrophilus pettiti =

Scientific classification
- Domain: Eukaryota
- Kingdom: Animalia
- Phylum: Arthropoda
- Class: Insecta
- Order: Coleoptera
- Suborder: Polyphaga
- Infraorder: Staphyliniformia
- Family: Agyrtidae
- Genus: Necrophilus
- Species: N. pettiti

Binomial name
- Necrophilus pettiti Horn, 1880

Species of beetle

Necrophilus pettiti, the small scavenger beetle, is a species of primitive carrion beetle in the family Agyrtidae. It is found in North America.
