= Arrhenopeplus =

Scientific classification
- Domain: Eukaryota
- Kingdom: Animalia
- Phylum: Arthropoda
- Class: Insecta
- Order: Coleoptera
- Suborder: Polyphaga
- Infraorder: Staphyliniformia
- Family: Staphylinidae
- Subfamily: Micropeplinae
- Genus: Arrhenopeplus; Koch, 1937

Genus of beetles

Arrhenopeplus is a genus of beetles belonging to the family Staphylinidae.

The genus was first described by Koch in 1937.

Species:

- Arrhenopeplus tesserula
