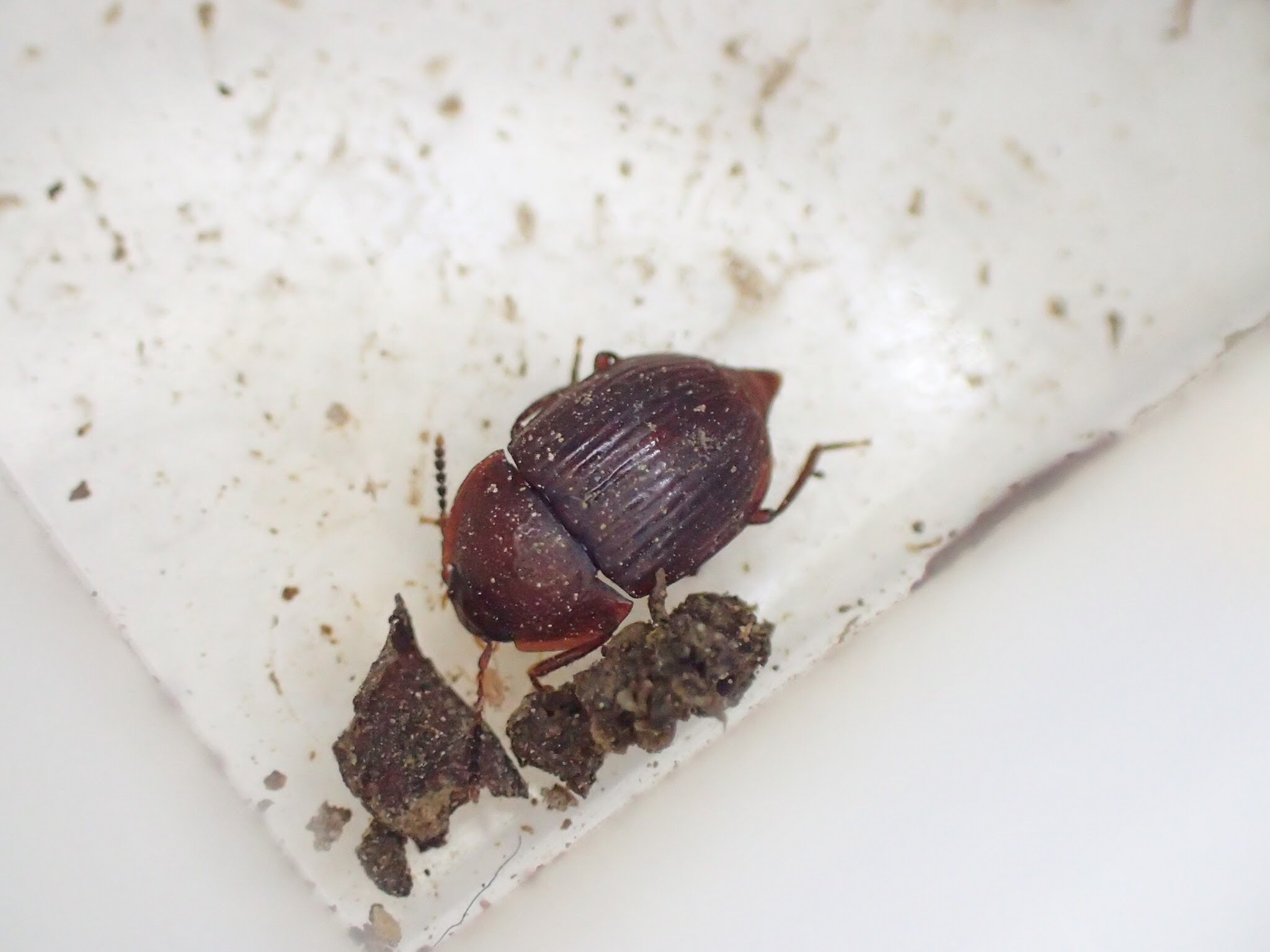
- Apatetica princeps

Scientific classification
- Kingdom: Animalia
- Phylum: Arthropoda
- Clade: Pancrustacea
- Class: Insecta
- Order: Coleoptera
- Suborder: Polyphaga
- Infraorder: Staphyliniformia
- Family: Staphylinidae
- Subfamily: Apateticinae
- Genus: Apatetica; Westwood, 1848

Synonyms
- Idiochila Bernhauer & Schubert, 1910; Trigaeus Bernhauer & Schubert, 1910; Idiocheila Frivaldszky, J., 1883; Trygaeus Sharp, 1874

= Apatetica =

Genus of beetles

Apatetica is a genus of rove beetles.

There are 27 species assigned to the genus, with one being provisionally accepted:

- A. angusticollis Chang, Schillhammer & Tang, 2024 (provisionally accepted)
- A. aspera Assing, 2018
- A. birmana Cameron, 1930
- A. brunnipes Ritsema, 1879
- A. caeruleipennis Cameron, 1930
- A. callosa Jansson, A., 1946
- A. confusa Assing, 2018
- A. curtipennis Assing, 2018
- A. gibba Assing, 2018
- A. glabra Assing, 2018
- A. glaucipennis Assing, 2018
- A. intermedia Cameron, 1930
- A. javanica (Sharp, 1892)
- A. laevicollis Fauvel, 1904
- A. lebioides Westwood, 1848
- A. nitiduloides Westwood, 1864
- A. princeps (Sharp, 1874)
- A. rotundicollis Fauvel, 1904
- A. semiviolacea Fauvel, 1904
- A. siamensis Lewis, 1893
- A. sikkimi Fauvel, 1895
- A. sparsicollis Fauvel, 1904
- A. spinipennis (Frivaldszky, J., 1883)
- A. sulcata Madge, 1980
- A. sumatrana Cameron, 1930
- A. viridipennis Fauvel, 1895
- A. xuyuhaoi Chang, Schillhammer & Tang, 2025
