= Trigonurus sharpi =

Scientific classification
- Domain: Eukaryota
- Kingdom: Animalia
- Phylum: Arthropoda
- Class: Insecta
- Order: Coleoptera
- Suborder: Polyphaga
- Infraorder: Staphyliniformia
- Family: Staphylinidae
- Genus: Trigonurus
- Species: T. sharpi

Binomial name
- Trigonurus sharpi Blackwelder, 1941

Species of beetle

Trigonurus sharpi is a species of rove beetle in the family Staphylinidae. It is found in North America.
