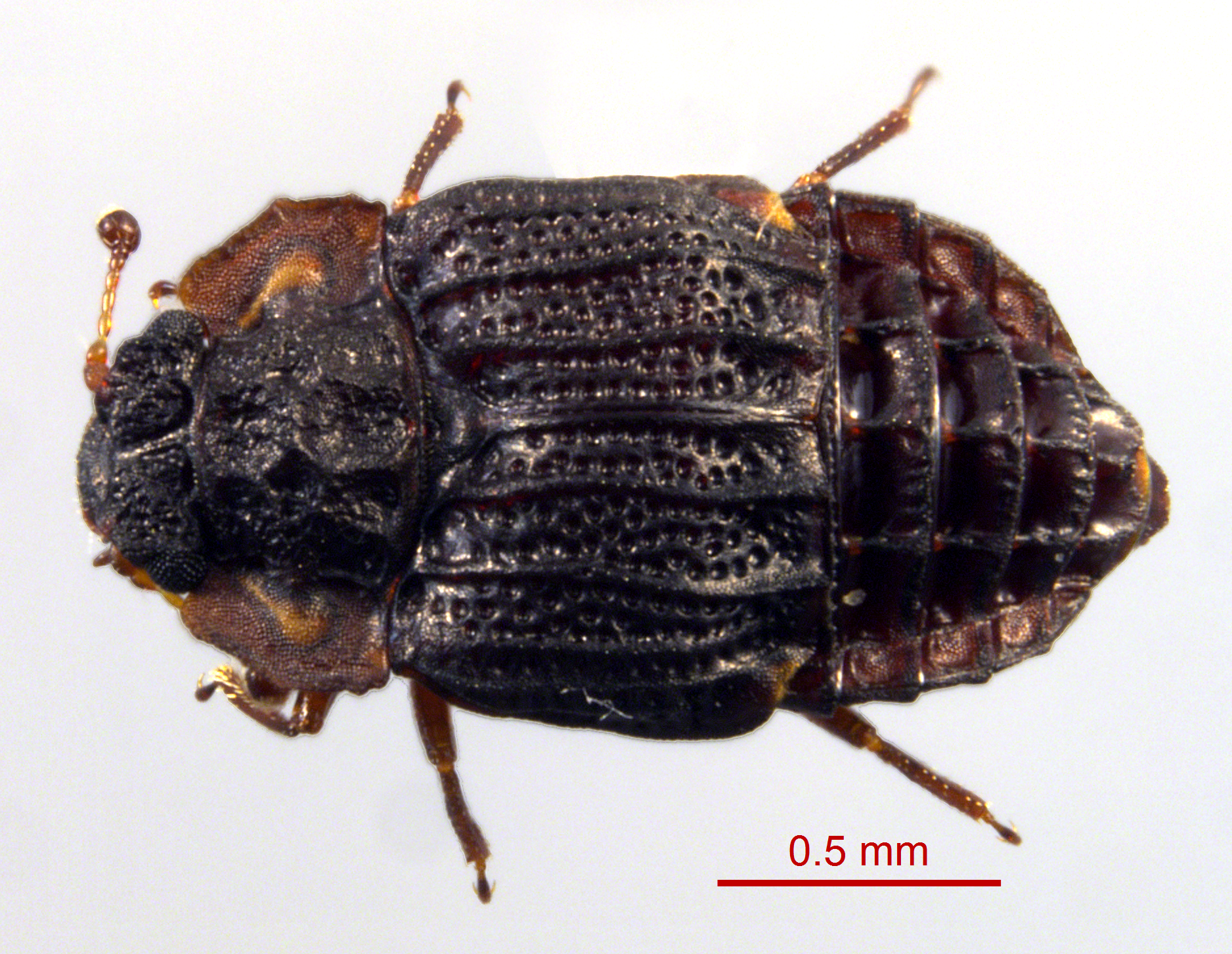

Scientific classification
- Kingdom: Animalia
- Phylum: Arthropoda
- Clade: Pancrustacea
- Class: Insecta
- Order: Coleoptera
- Suborder: Polyphaga
- Infraorder: Staphyliniformia
- Family: Staphylinidae
- Subfamily: Micropeplinae
- Genus: Micropeplus; Latreille, 1809

= Micropeplus =

Micropeplus Temporal range: Cenomanian–Recent

Genus of beetles

Micropeplus is a genus of rove beetles in the family Staphylinidae. There are at least 40 described species in Micropeplus.

== Species ==
These 43 species belong to the genus Micropeplus:

- Micropeplus browni Campbell, 1968^{g b}
- Micropeplus brunneus Méklin, 1852^{g}
- Micropeplus caelatus Erichson, 1839^{g}
- Micropeplus calabricus Reitter, 1907^{g}
- Micropeplus clypeatus Campbell, 1992^{c g}
- Micropeplus cribratus LeConte, 1863^{g b}
- Micropeplus dentatus Zhao & Zhou, 2004^{c g}
- Micropeplus doderoi Normand, 1920^{g}
- Micropeplus fulvus Erichson, 1840^{c g}
- Micropeplus gomerensis Assing, 1999^{g}
- Micropeplus graecus Reitter, 1887^{g}
- Micropeplus jason^{g}
- Micropeplus laevipennis Eppelsheim, 1880^{c g}
- Micropeplus laticollis Méklin, 1853^{g b}
- Micropeplus latus Hampe, 1861^{g}
- Micropeplus longipennis Kraatz, 1859^{c g}
- Micropeplus marietti Jacquelin du Val, 1857^{g}
- Micropeplus minor Campbell, 1974^{g}
- Micropeplus neotomae^{b}
- Micropeplus nitidipennis Campbell, 1995^{c g}
- Micropeplus nomurai Watanabe, 2000^{c g}
- Micropeplus obscurus Campbell, 1992^{c g}
- Micropeplus obsoletus Rey, 1884^{g}
- Micropeplus parvulus^{g}
- Micropeplus piankouensis^{g}
- Micropeplus porcatus Paykull, 1789^{g}
- Micropeplus punctatus LeConte, 1863^{b}
- Micropeplus punicus Normand, 1928^{b}
- Micropeplus ripicola Kerstens, 1964^{g}
- Micropeplus robustus Campbell, 1968^{g}
- Micropeplus rougemonti Watanabe, 1995^{c g}
- Micropeplus sculptus LeConte, 1863^{g b}
- Micropeplus shanghaiensis Li & Zhao, 2001^{c g}
- Micropeplus sinensis Watanabe & Luo, 1991^{c g}
- Micropeplus sinuatus Campbell, 1992^{c g}
- Micropeplus smetanai Campbell, 1973^{g}
- Micropeplus spinatus Campbell, 1992^{c g}
- Micropeplus staphylinoides (Marsham, 1802)^{g}
- Micropeplus taiwanensis Campbell, 1992^{c g}
- Micropeplus tesserula^{b}
- Micropeplus uenoi Watanabe, 2000^{c g}
- Micropeplus yunnanus Watanabe & Xiao, 1996^{c g}
- Micropeplus yushanensis Campbell, 1995^{c g}
- Micropeplus liweiae

Data sources: i = Integrated Taxonomic Information System, c = Catalogue of Life, g = Global Biodiversity Information Facility, b = Bugguide.net

=== Fossil species ===
- †Micropeplus hoogendorni Matthews 1970 Imuruk Volcanics Formation, Alaska, Messinian
- †Micropeplus hopkinsi Matthews 1970 Imuruk Volcanics Formation, Alaska, Messinian
- †Micropeplus macrofulvus Gersdorf 1976 Willershausen, Germany, Piacenzian
- †Micropeplus pengweii Jiang et al. 2020 Burmese amber, Myanmar, Cenomanian
