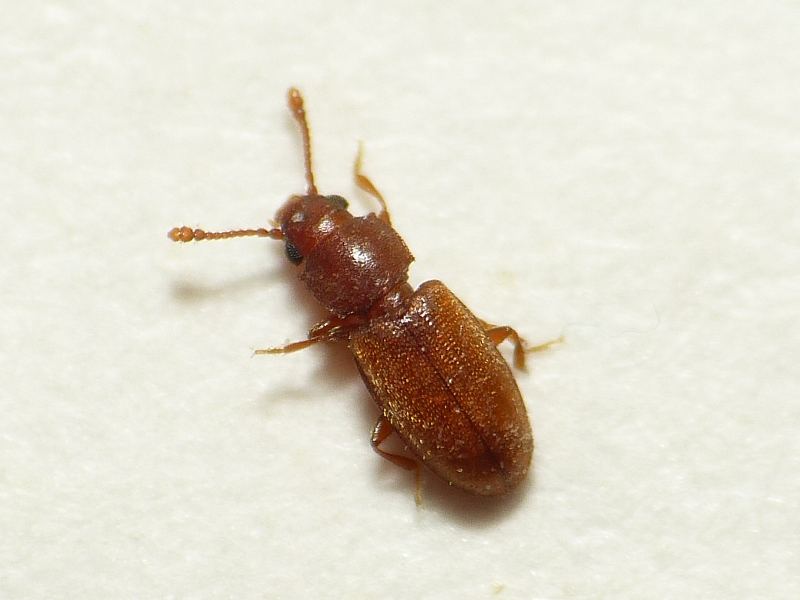

Scientific classification
- Kingdom: Animalia
- Phylum: Arthropoda
- Class: Insecta
- Order: Coleoptera
- Suborder: Polyphaga
- Infraorder: Cucujiformia
- Family: Silvanidae
- Genus: Ahasverus
- Species: A. advena

Binomial name
- Ahasverus advena (Waltl, 1832)

= Ahasverus advena =

Species of beetle

Ahasverus advena, the foreign grain beetle, is a species of beetle in the family Silvanidae. It is related to the sawtoothed grain beetle.

== Description ==
The foreign grain beetle is approximately 2 mm (1/12 in) in length. It can be distinguished from other grain beetles from its slight projections or knobs on each front corner of the pronotum, and its club-shaped antennae. However, other Ahasverus species look very similar and particular confusion can occur with Ahasverus rectus, which is also found in grain bins in North America. The larvae are worm-like, cream-colored and often reach a length of 3 mm before pupating into darker adults. Males and females are identical in appearance both as larvae and adults. The adult is usually reddish brown, or sometimes black.

== Natural history ==
=== Distribution ===
The foreign grain beetle is found in tropical and temperate regions. It can complete development at temperatures between 20 and 35 °C.

=== Behavior ===
At 30 °C this species can only survive if relative humidity is at least 70%, or at least 65% at 20 °C (because the equilibrium moisture content of the substrate will be similar), a condition necessary for the development of fungi on which it feeds. It feeds chiefly on fungi, including yeasts. It can often be found in grain storage facilities, where it feeds on the mold growing on the grain. It is also found on other stored foodstuff, such as peanuts and dried fruits. It can be found in various moist locations where fungus develop, such as the walls of houses around plumbing systems.

=== Life cycle ===
The adult female can begin laying eggs around 3 to 4 days after emerging from the pupa. It can lay up to 8 or 12 eggs per day, but generally produces 1 to 4. Eggs are laid singly or in clusters of two or three, and they hatch in 4 to 5 days. The larval stage is completed in 11 to 19 days, and pupation takes 3 to 5 days. Larval development takes longer in drier conditions. Mated males have an average life span of 159 days, and mated females live about 208 days. Unmated beetles live longer, males up to 275 days, and females up to 300.

== Impact on humans ==
The beetle is harmless. It may inhabit dwellings and infest products such as grains, cereals, oilseeds, dried fruit, and spices, particularly if the product is moldy. The presence of the beetle is a good indicator of damp storage conditions and spoiled food. It does not damage the food itself, or any structures.

== Control ==
The beetle is controlled in an environment by eliminating damp habitat. However, this species can develop on dry fungi so drying grain or other stored products in which it already occurs will not immediately control the beetle. Fumigants or contact insecticides may be used, but unless the moist environment is eliminated the beetle is likely to re-occur. Since the foreign grain beetle does not feed on grain or other foodstuff (except mushroom) it is technically not a pest of stored products and its presence in grain does not impede its commercialization. In the US, the legislation regulating the presence of insects in grain is the Official United States Standards for Grain, Subpart A—General Provisions, which stipulates that grain is considered infested if it contains "live weevils" or "other live insects injurious to stored grain"; and in Canada the corresponding legislation is the Canadian Grain Act, which stipulates that "receipt and marketing of infested grain (i.e., grain containing any injurious, noxious or troublesome insect or animal pest) is prohibited". Since the foreign grain beetle is not injurious to grain, its presence in grain is of little consequence, except that it is a telltale that the grain is going out of condition.

=== Biological control ===
Various insect predators and parasitic wasps attack this beetle, but since it is not a pest species it has not been the subject of a biological control program.
