= Derolathrus =

Derolathrus Temporal range: Cenomanian–Recent

Scientific classification
- Kingdom: Animalia
- Phylum: Arthropoda
- Class: Insecta
- Order: Coleoptera
- Suborder: Polyphaga
- Infraorder: Staphyliniformia
- Family: Jacobsoniidae
- Genus: Derolathrus; Sharp in Sharp & Scott, 1908

Synonyms
- Gomya Dajoz, 1973; Lathridiomorphus Franz, 1969

Genus of beetles

Derolathrus is a genus of Jacobson's beetles in the family Jacobsoniidae. There are 12 described species in Derolathrus.

== Species ==
These 12 species belong to the genus Derolathrus:

- †Derolathrus abyssus Yamamoto & Parker, 2017 (Cenomanian, Burmese amber)
- Derolathrus anophthalmus (Franz, 1969)
- Derolathrus atomus Sharp, 1908
- Derolathrus cavernicolus Peck, 2010
- †Derolathrus capdoliensis Tihelka et al., 2022 (Cenomanian, Charentese amber)
- Derolathrus ceylonicus (Sen Gupta, 1979)
- Derolathrus foveiceps (Théry, 2023)
- †Derolathrus groehni Cai et al., 2016 (Cenomanian, Burmese amber)
- Derolathrus insularis (Dajoz, 1973)
- Derolathrus parvulus (Rücker, 1983)
- Derolathrus sharpi Grouvelle, 1912
- Derolathrus troglophilus (Sen Gupta, 1979)
