= Derolathrus cavernicolus =

Scientific classification
- Domain: Eukaryota
- Kingdom: Animalia
- Phylum: Arthropoda
- Class: Insecta
- Order: Coleoptera
- Suborder: Polyphaga
- Infraorder: Staphyliniformia
- Family: Jacobsoniidae
- Genus: Derolathrus
- Species: D. cavernicolus

Binomial name
- Derolathrus cavernicolus Peck, 2010

Species of beetle

Derolathrus cavernicolus is a species of Jacobson's beetle in the family Jacobsoniidae. It is found in the Caribbean Sea and North America.
