= Agyrtes longulus =

Scientific classification
- Domain: Eukaryota
- Kingdom: Animalia
- Phylum: Arthropoda
- Class: Insecta
- Order: Coleoptera
- Suborder: Polyphaga
- Infraorder: Staphyliniformia
- Family: Agyrtidae
- Genus: Agyrtes
- Species: A. longulus

Binomial name
- Agyrtes longulus (LeConte, 1859)

Species of beetle

Agyrtes longulus is a species of primitive carrion beetle in the family Agyrtidae. It is found in North America.
