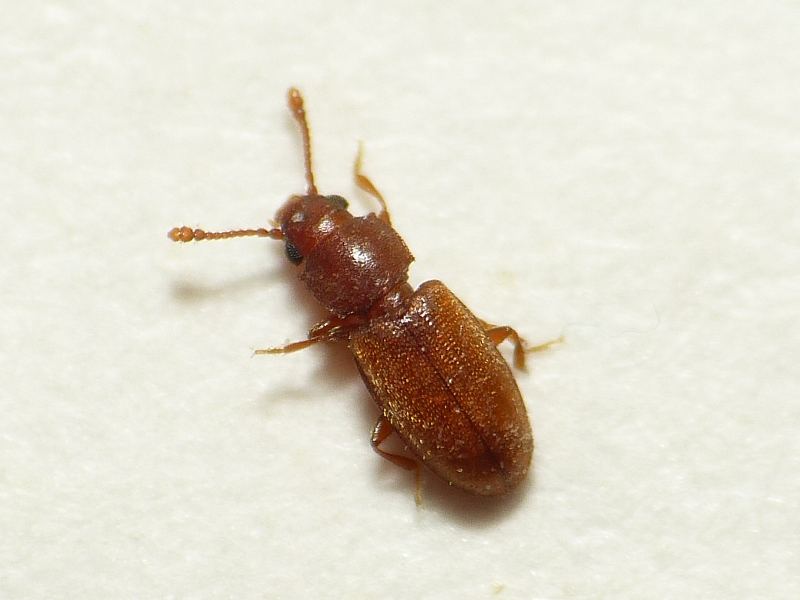
- Ahasverus advena

Scientific classification
- Domain: Eukaryota
- Kingdom: Animalia
- Phylum: Arthropoda
- Class: Insecta
- Order: Coleoptera
- Suborder: Polyphaga
- Infraorder: Cucujiformia
- Family: Silvanidae
- Subfamily: Silvaninae
- Genus: Ahasverus; Des Gozis, 1881

= Ahasverus (beetle) =

Genus of beetles

Ahasverus is a genus of beetles in the family Silvanidae.

Species include:

- Ahasverus advena Waltl
- Ahasverus cryptophagoides Reitter
- Ahasverus delauneyi Grouvelle
- Ahasverus excisus Reitter
- Ahasverus humeralis Grouvelle
- Ahasverus longulus Blatchley
- Ahasverus nausibioides Grouvelle
- Ahasverus plagiatus Grouvelle
- Ahasverus rectus LeConte
- Ahasverus subopacus Grouvelle
