= Derolathrus ceylonicus =

Scientific classification
- Kingdom: Animalia
- Phylum: Arthropoda
- Class: Insecta
- Order: Coleoptera
- Suborder: Polyphaga
- Infraorder: Staphyliniformia
- Family: Jacobsoniidae
- Genus: Derolathrus
- Species: D. ceylonicus

Binomial name
- Derolathrus ceylonicus (Sen Gupta, 1979)

Synonyms
- Gomya ceylonica Sen Gupta, 1979; Derolathrus ceylonicus Löbl & Burckhardt, 1988

Species of beetle

Derolathrus ceylonicus, is a species of Jacobson beetle endemic to Sri Lanka.
