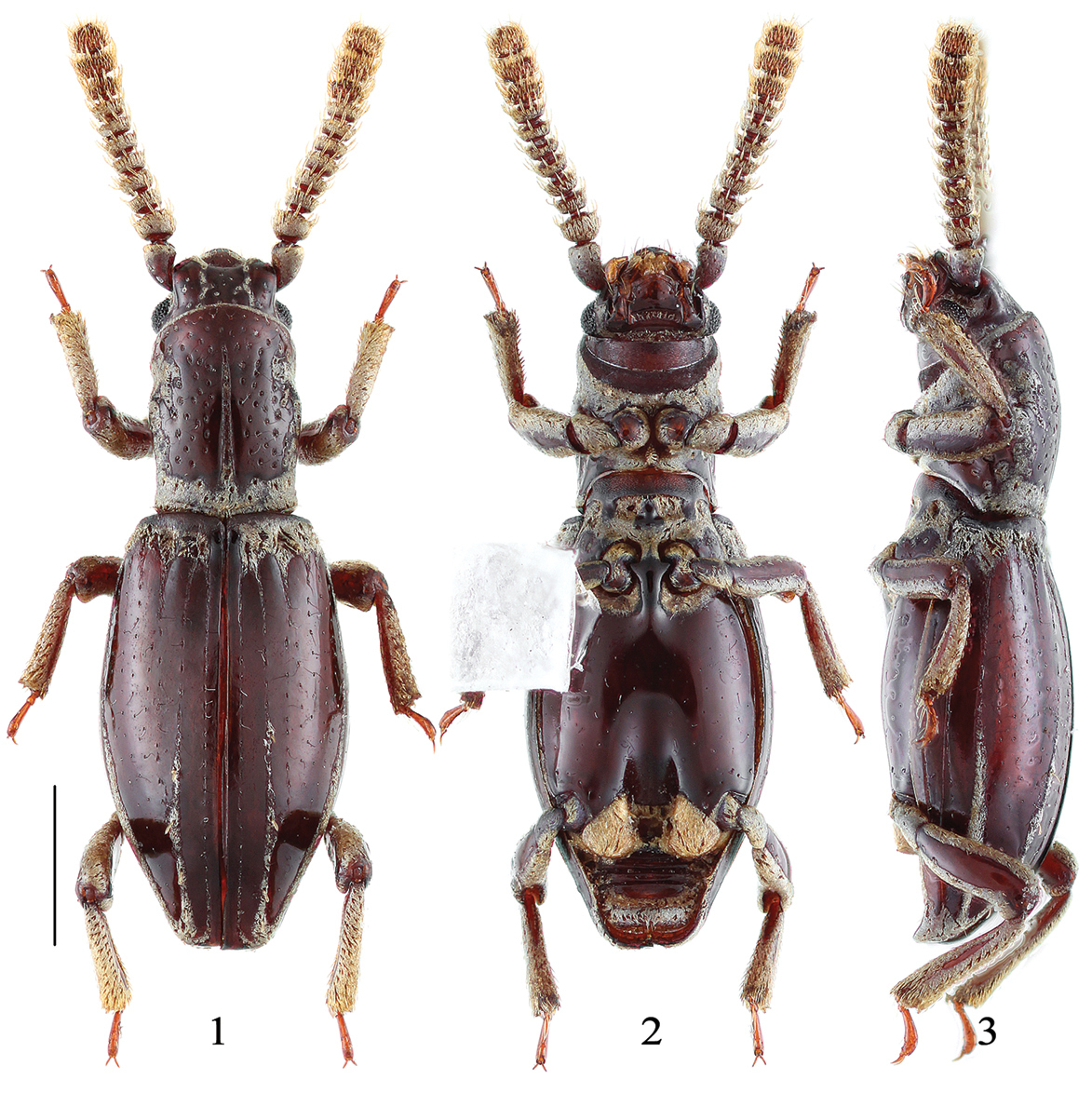
- Sarothrias sinicus in various views, scale bar = 0.5 mm
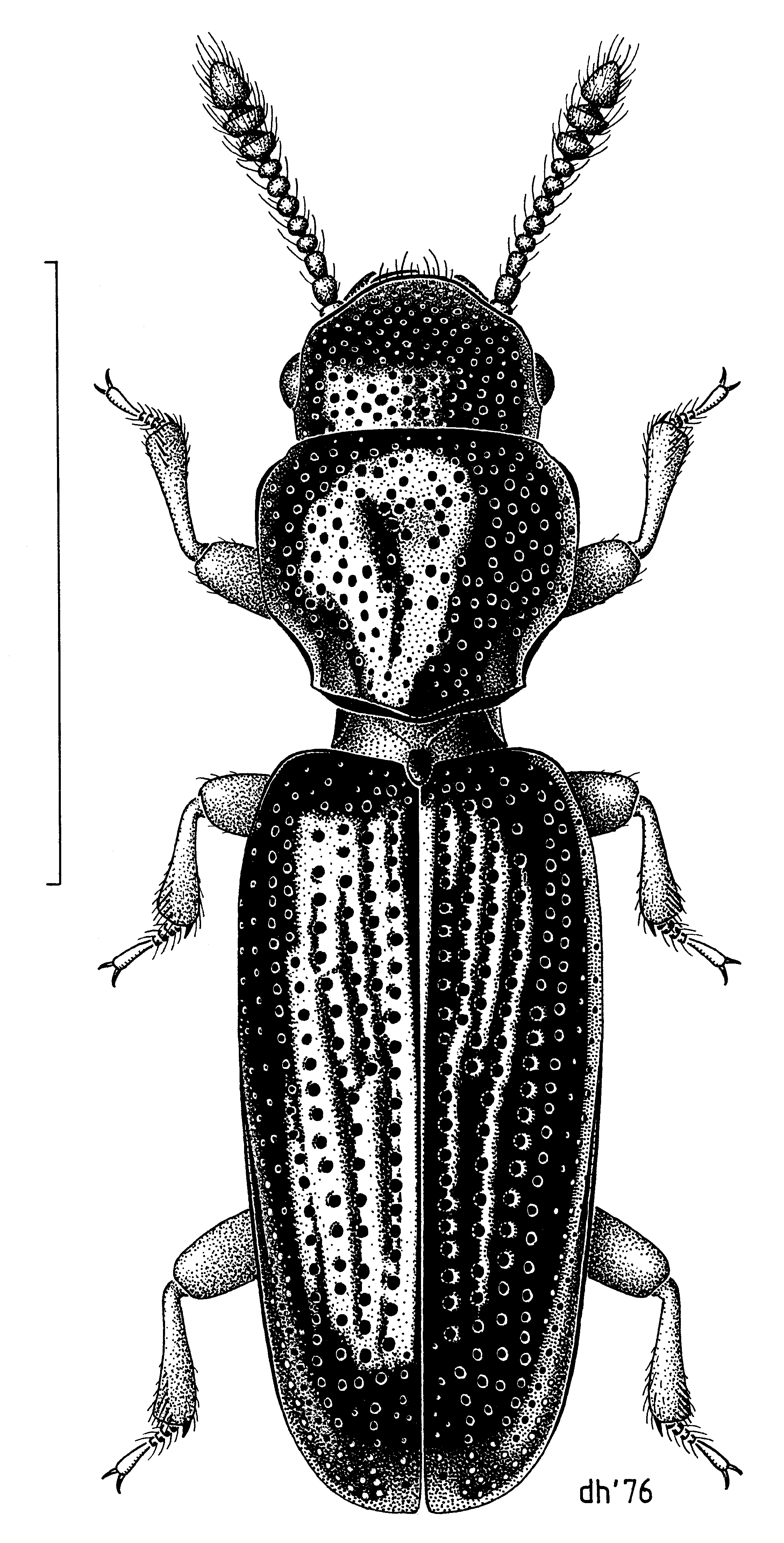
- Saphophagus minutus

Scientific classification
- Kingdom: Animalia
- Phylum: Arthropoda
- Clade: Pancrustacea
- Class: Insecta
- Order: Coleoptera
- Suborder: Polyphaga
- Infraorder: Staphyliniformia
- Superfamily: Staphylinoidea
- Family: Jacobsoniidae; Heller, 1926

Synonyms
- Sarothriidae Crowson, 1955; Derolathriinae Sen Gupta, 1979

= Jacobsoniidae =

Jacobsoniidae Temporal range: latest Albian - Present ~100–0 Ma

Family of beetles

Jacobsoniidae are a family of tiny beetles belonging to Staphylinoidea. The larvae and adults live under bark, in plant litter, fungi, bat guano and rotten wood. There are around 30 described species in three genera:

== Description ==
Members of this family have a small body size (0.7-2.1mm in length). Their bodies are narrow, and are four times as long as they are wide. They are often a yellowish-brown in color.

== Ecology ==
Members of the group have primarily been found in leaf litter or in rotting wood, but some has have also been found in fungal fruiting bodies or bat guano. The biology of members of this group is essentially unknown.

== Taxonomy ==
Their taxonomic position has long been controversial, originally they were placed in Dermestoidea, before being considered Polyphaga incertae sedis. They were later placed in the Staphylinoidea, which is supported by characters of the wing venation as well as the morphology of the larval galea of the maxillae.

== Distribution ==
Members of this family have been found in Alabama, Florida, South America, Central America, Polynesia, Africa, Australia, New Zealand, Europe and Asia.

== Taxonomy ==
- Genus Sarothrias Grouvelle, 1918 (India, Southeast Asia, China, Oceania)
  - Sarothrias amabilis Ślipiński & Löbl, 1995
  - Sarothrias audax Ślipiński & Löbl, 1995
  - Sarothrias bournei Ślipiński, 1986
  - †Sarothrias cretaceus Cai et al., 2017 (Cenomanian, Burmese amber)
  - Sarothrias crowsoni Löbl & Burckhardt, 1988
  - Sarothrias dimerus (Heller, 1926)
  - Sarothrias eximius Grouvelle, 1918
  - Sarothrias fijianus Löbl & Burckhardt, 1988
  - Sarothrias hygrophilus Pal, 1998
  - Sarothrias indicus Dajoz, 1978
  - Sarothrias lawrencei Löbl & Burckhardt, 1988
  - Sarothrias morokanus Poggi, 1991
  - Sarothrias pacificus Ślipiński & Löbl, 1995
  - Sarothrias papuanus Ślipiński, 1986
  - Sarothrias sinicus Bi & Chen, 2015
  - Sarothrias songi Yin & Bi, 2018
- Genus Saphophagus Sharp, 1886 (New Zealand)
  - Saphophagus minutus Sharp, 1886
- Genus Derolathrus Sharp, 1908 (Oceania, Macaronesia, North America, Mauritius, Indian subcontinent)
  - †Derolathrus abyssus Yamamoto & Parker, 2017 (Cenomanian, Burmese amber)
  - Derolathrus anophthalmus (Franz, 1969)
  - Derolathrus atomus Sharp, 1908
  - Derolathrus cavernicolus Peck, 2010
  - †Derolathrus capdoliensis Tihelka et al., 2022 (Cenomanian, Charentese amber)
  - Derolathrus ceylonicus (Sen Gupta, 1979)
  - Derolathrus foveiceps Théry, 2023
  - †Derolathrus groehni Cai et al., 2016 (Eocene, Baltic amber)
  - Derolathrus insularis (Dajoz, 1973)
  - Derolathrus parvulus (Rücker, 1983)
  - Derolathrus sharpi Grouvelle, 1912
  - Derolathrus subtilis Théry, 2023
  - Derolathrus troglophilus (Sen Gupta, 1979)
