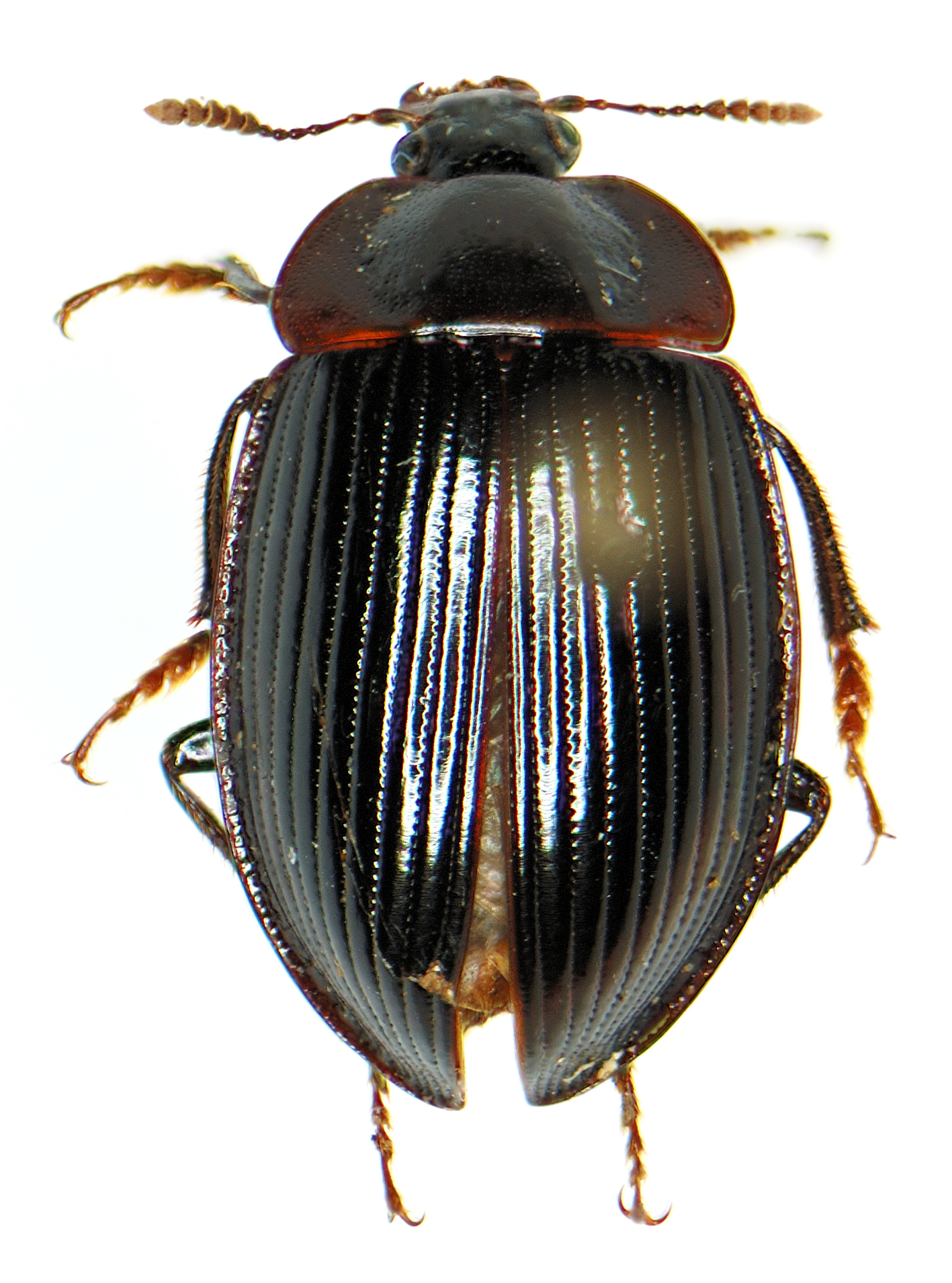

Scientific classification
- Kingdom: Animalia
- Phylum: Arthropoda
- Clade: Pancrustacea
- Class: Insecta
- Order: Coleoptera
- Suborder: Polyphaga
- Infraorder: Staphyliniformia
- Family: Agyrtidae
- Genus: Necrophilus
- Species: N. hydrophiloides

Binomial name
- Necrophilus hydrophiloides Guérin-Méneville, 1835

= Necrophilus hydrophiloides =

Species of beetle

Necrophilus hydrophiloides, the flat brown scavenger beetle, is a species of primitive carrion beetle in the family Agyrtidae. It is found in North America.
