= Protactus =

Scientific classification
- Kingdom: Animalia
- Phylum: Arthropoda
- Clade: Pancrustacea
- Class: Insecta
- Order: Coleoptera
- Suborder: Polyphaga
- Infraorder: Staphyliniformia
- Family: Staphylinidae
- Subfamily: †Protactinae; Heer, 1847
- Genus: †Protactus; Heer, 1847

Genus of insects

Protactus is an extinct genus of rove beetles. It was first described in 1847 by Heer. It is the only genus in the extinct subfamily Protactinae. There currently two accepted species. Species have been found in the western United States and in Europe.

== Species ==
- †Protactus erichsonii
- †Protactus minor
