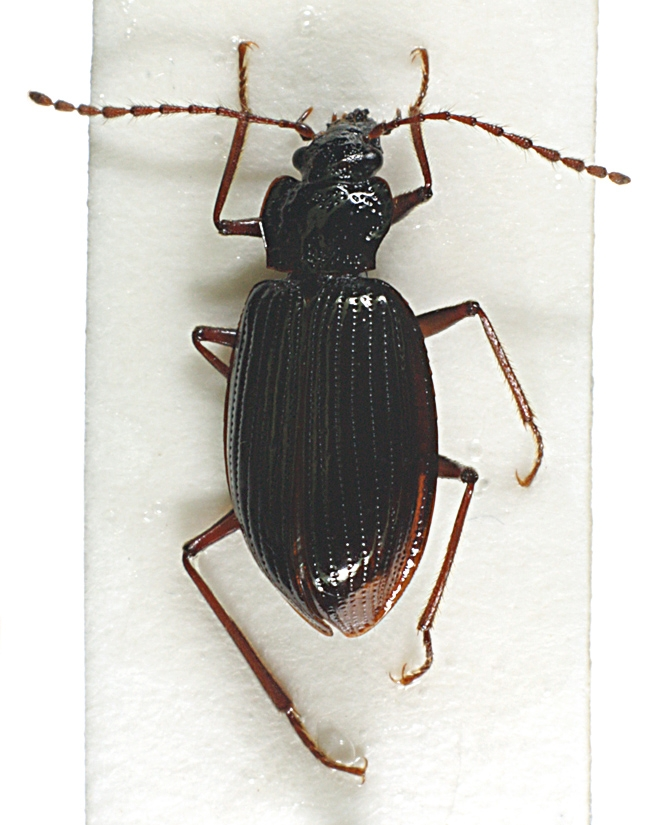
- Pteroloma forsstromii

Scientific classification
- Kingdom: Animalia
- Phylum: Arthropoda
- Clade: Pancrustacea
- Class: Insecta
- Order: Coleoptera
- Suborder: Polyphaga
- Infraorder: Staphyliniformia
- Family: Agyrtidae
- Genus: Pteroloma

Synonyms
- Adolus, Holocnemis

= Pteroloma =

Genus of beetles

Pteroloma is a genus of primitive carrion beetles in the family Agyrtidae. It was first described by Leonard Gyllenhal in 1827. It contains 9 species. All recorded observations have been made in the Northern Hemisphere, with the majority being made in Finland, Norway, Sweden and Japan.

== Species ==
- Pteroloma altaicum
- Pteroloma forsstromii
- Pteroloma koebelei
- Pteroloma kurosawai
- Pteroloma nebrioides
- Pteroloma nigromontanum
- Pteroloma plutenkoi
- Pteroloma rufovittatum
- Pteroloma sibiricum
