= Neophonus =

Scientific classification
- Kingdom: Animalia
- Phylum: Arthropoda
- Clade: Pancrustacea
- Class: Insecta
- Order: Coleoptera
- Suborder: Polyphaga
- Infraorder: Staphyliniformia
- Family: Staphylinidae
- Subfamily: Neophoninae; Fauvel, 1905
- Genus: Neophonus; Fauvel, 1905
- Species: N. bruchi

Binomial name
- Neophonus bruchi Fauvel, 1905

Genus of beetles

Neophoninae is a subfamily of rove beetles, containing only one genus and one species. The genus is called Neophonus, and the species is Neophonus bruchi. They were first described in 1905 by Fauvel. They have been spotted in southern South America.
