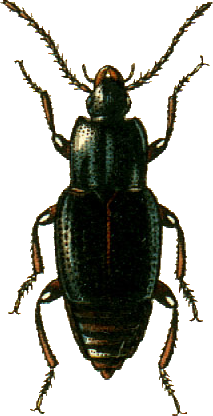
- Trigonurus mellyi

Scientific classification
- Domain: Eukaryota
- Kingdom: Animalia
- Phylum: Arthropoda
- Class: Insecta
- Order: Coleoptera
- Suborder: Polyphaga
- Infraorder: Staphyliniformia
- Family: Staphylinidae
- Subfamily: Trigonurinae
- Genus: Trigonurus; Mulsant, 1847

= Trigonurus =

Genus of beetles

Trigonurus is a genus of rove beetles in the family Staphylinidae, the only family of the subfamily Trigonurinae. There are about nine described species in Trigonurus, found in the Holarctic.

== Species ==
These nine species belong to the genus Trigonurus:

- Trigonurus asiaticus Reiche, 1865
- Trigonurus bruzasi Hatch, 1957^{i c g}
- Trigonurus caelatus LeConte, 1874^{i c g}
- Trigonurus crotchii LeConte, 1874^{i c g}
- Trigonurus dilaticollis VanDyke, 1934^{i c g}
- Trigonurus edwardsi Sharp, 1875^{i c g b}
- Trigonurus mellyi Mulsant, 1847^{g}
- Trigonurus rugosus Sharp, 1875^{i c g b}
- Trigonurus sharpi Blackwelder, 1941^{i c g b}

Data sources: i = ITIS, c = Catalogue of Life, g = GBIF, b = Bugguide.net
