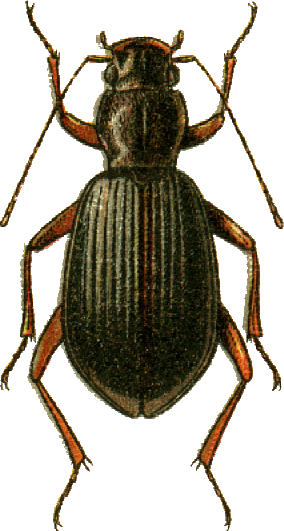
- Lyrosoma opacum

Scientific classification
- Domain: Eukaryota
- Kingdom: Animalia
- Phylum: Arthropoda
- Class: Insecta
- Order: Coleoptera
- Suborder: Polyphaga
- Infraorder: Staphyliniformia
- Family: Agyrtidae
- Genus: Lyrosoma; Mannerheim, 1853

= Lyrosoma =

Genus of beetles

Lyrosoma is a genus of primitive carrion beetles in the family Agyrtidae. There are at least three described species in Lyrosoma.

== Species ==
These three species belong to the genus Lyrosoma:

- Lyrosoma chujoi Mroczkowski, 1959
- Lyrosoma opacum Mannerheim, 1853
- Lyrosoma pallidum Eschscholtz
