= Ahasverus rectus =

Scientific classification
- Kingdom: Animalia
- Phylum: Arthropoda
- Class: Insecta
- Order: Coleoptera
- Suborder: Polyphaga
- Infraorder: Cucujiformia
- Family: Silvanidae
- Genus: Ahasverus
- Species: A. rectus

Binomial name
- Ahasverus rectus (LeConte, 1854)

Synonyms
- Silvanus rectus LeConte, 1854

Species of beetle

Ahasverus rectus is a species of silvanid flat bark beetle in the family Silvanidae. It is found in North America.
