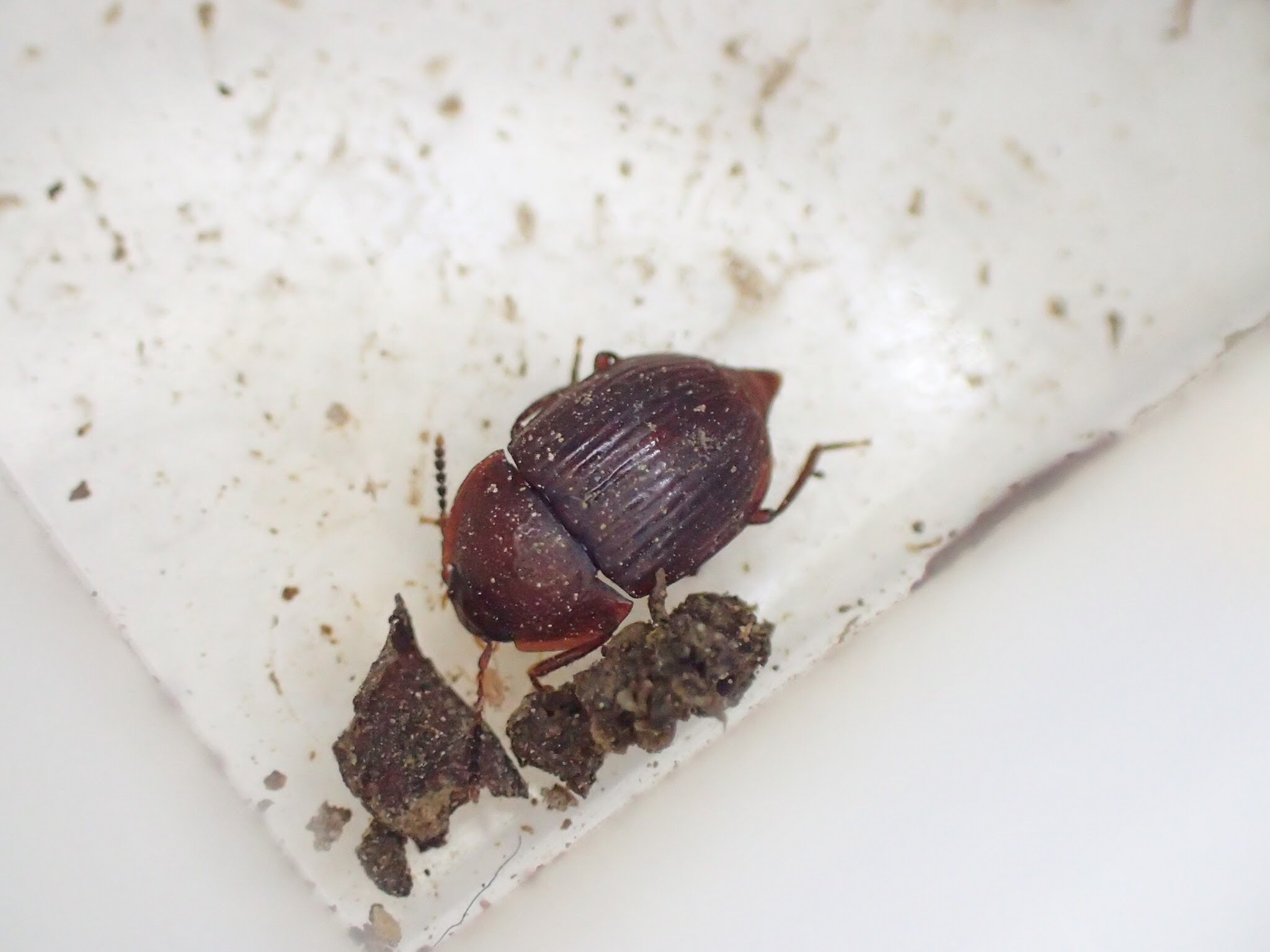
- Apatetica princeps

Scientific classification
- Kingdom: Animalia
- Phylum: Arthropoda
- Clade: Pancrustacea
- Class: Insecta
- Order: Coleoptera
- Suborder: Polyphaga
- Infraorder: Staphyliniformia
- Family: Staphylinidae
- Subfamily: Apateticinae; Fauvel, 1895

Genera
- Apatetica Westwood, 1848; Nodynus Waterhouse, C. O., 1876

= Apateticinae =

Subfamily of beetle

Apateticinae is a subfamily of rove beetles that was first described by Fauvel in 1895. It contains 34 species split between two genera. They are found primarily in east Asia, with a few instances of them being spotted in south Asia.

== Genera and species ==
There are 27 species assigned to the genus Apatetica, with one being provisionally accepted:

- A. angusticollis Chang, Schillhammer & Tang, 2024 (provisionally accepted)
- A. aspera Assing, 2018
- A. birmana Cameron, 1930
- A. brunnipes Ritsema, 1879
- A. caeruleipennis Cameron, 1930
- A. callosa Jansson, A., 1946
- A. confusa Assing, 2018
- A. curtipennis Assing, 2018
- A. gibba Assing, 2018
- A. glabra Assing, 2018
- A. glaucipennis Assing, 2018
- A. intermedia Cameron, 1930
- A. javanica (Sharp, 1892)
- A. laevicollis Fauvel, 1904
- A. lebioides Westwood, 1848
- A. nitiduloides Westwood, 1864
- A. princeps (Sharp, 1874)
- A. rotundicollis Fauvel, 1904
- A. semiviolacea Fauvel, 1904
- A. siamensis Lewis, 1893
- A. sikkimi Fauvel, 1895
- A. sparsicollis Fauvel, 1904
- A. spinipennis (Frivaldszky, J., 1883)
- A. sulcata Madge, 1980
- A. sumatrana Cameron, 1930
- A. viridipennis Fauvel, 1895
- A. xuyuhaoi Chang, Schillhammer & Tang, 2025

There are eight species assigned to the genus Nodynus:

- N. huapingensis Chang, Schillhammer & Tang, 2025
- N. kasaharai Hayashi, Y., 2002
- N. leucofasciatus Lewis, 1879
- N. nitidus Waterhouse, C. O., 1876
- N. rubrofasciatus Jansson, A., 1946
- N. silphoides Jansson, A., 1946
- N. unicolor Jansson, A., 1946
- N. yeren Rougemont, 2015
