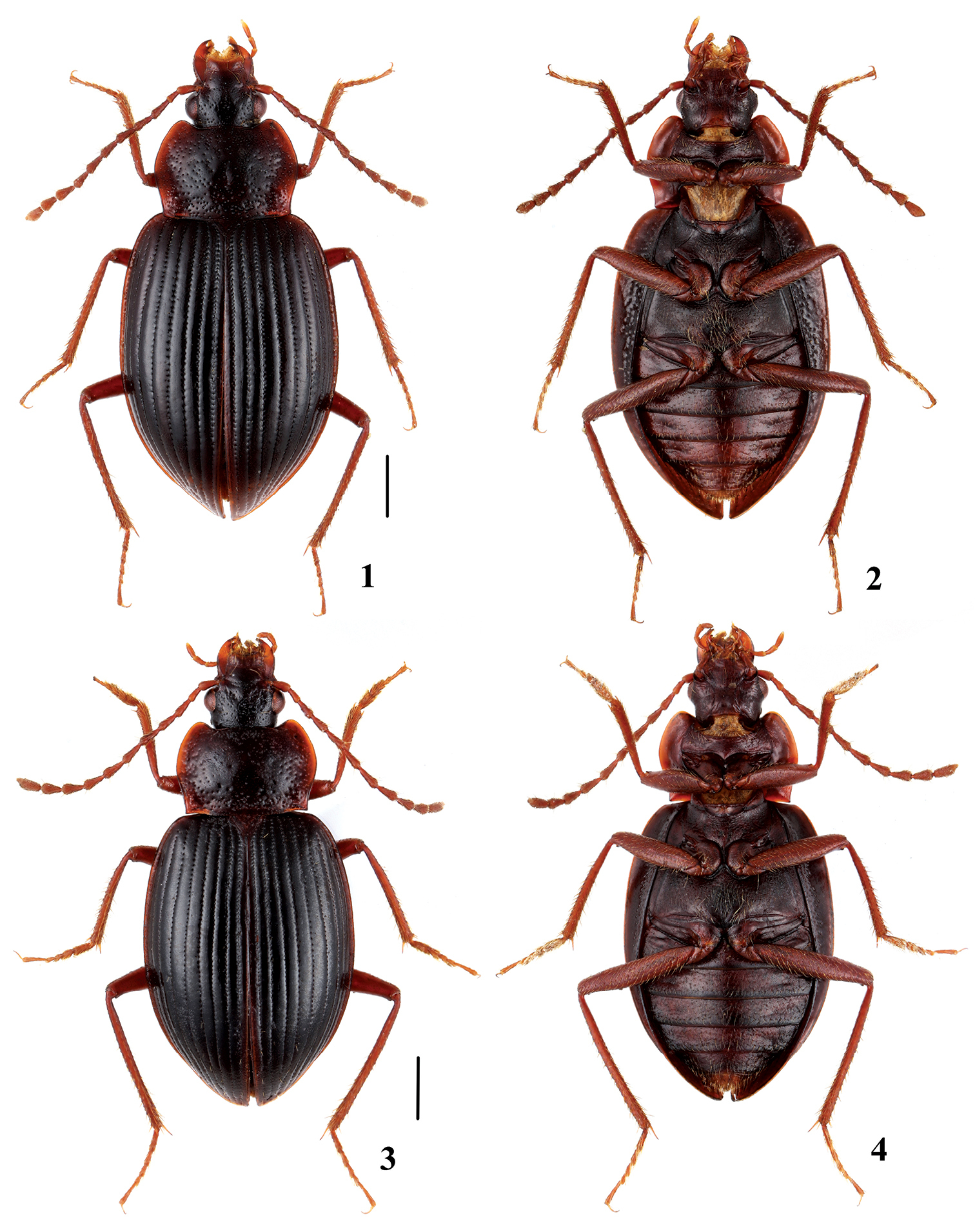
- Female (top) and male (bottom) specimens of Apteroloma

Scientific classification
- Domain: Eukaryota
- Kingdom: Animalia
- Phylum: Arthropoda
- Class: Insecta
- Order: Coleoptera
- Suborder: Polyphaga
- Infraorder: Staphyliniformia
- Family: Agyrtidae
- Genus: Apteroloma; Hatch, 1927

= Apteroloma =

Genus of beetles

Apteroloma is a genus of primitive carrion beetles in the family Agyrtidae. There are about 14 described species in Apteroloma.

== Species ==
These 14 species belong to the genus Apteroloma:

- Apteroloma anglorossicum Semenov, 1890
- Apteroloma arizonicum (Van Dyke, 1928)
- Apteroloma caraboides (Fall, 1907)
- Apteroloma discicolle
- Apteroloma gotoi
- Apteroloma harmandi Portevin, 1903
- Apteroloma jinfo Ruzicka, Schneider & Hava, 2004
- Apteroloma kozlovi Semenov-Tian-Shanskij & Znojko, 1932
- Apteroloma potanini Semenov, 1893
- Apteroloma sillemi Jeannel, 1935
- Apteroloma tahoecum (Fall, 1927)
- Apteroloma tenuicorne (Leconte, 1859)
- Apteroloma tenuicornis (LeConte, 1859)
- Apteroloma zhejiangense Tang, Li & Růžička, 2011
