= Ipelates =

Scientific classification
- Kingdom: Animalia
- Phylum: Arthropoda
- Class: Insecta
- Order: Coleoptera
- Suborder: Polyphaga
- Infraorder: Staphyliniformia
- Family: Agyrtidae
- Genus: Ipelates; Reitter, 1885

Genus of beetles

Ipelates is a genus of primitive carrion beetles in the family Agyrtidae. There are at least four described species in Ipelates.

== Species ==
These four species belong to the genus Ipelates:

- Ipelates kerneggeri Perkovsky, 2005
- Ipelates latissimus (Reitter, 1884)
- Ipelates latus (Mannerheim, 1852)
- Ipelates weitshati Perkovsky, 2007
