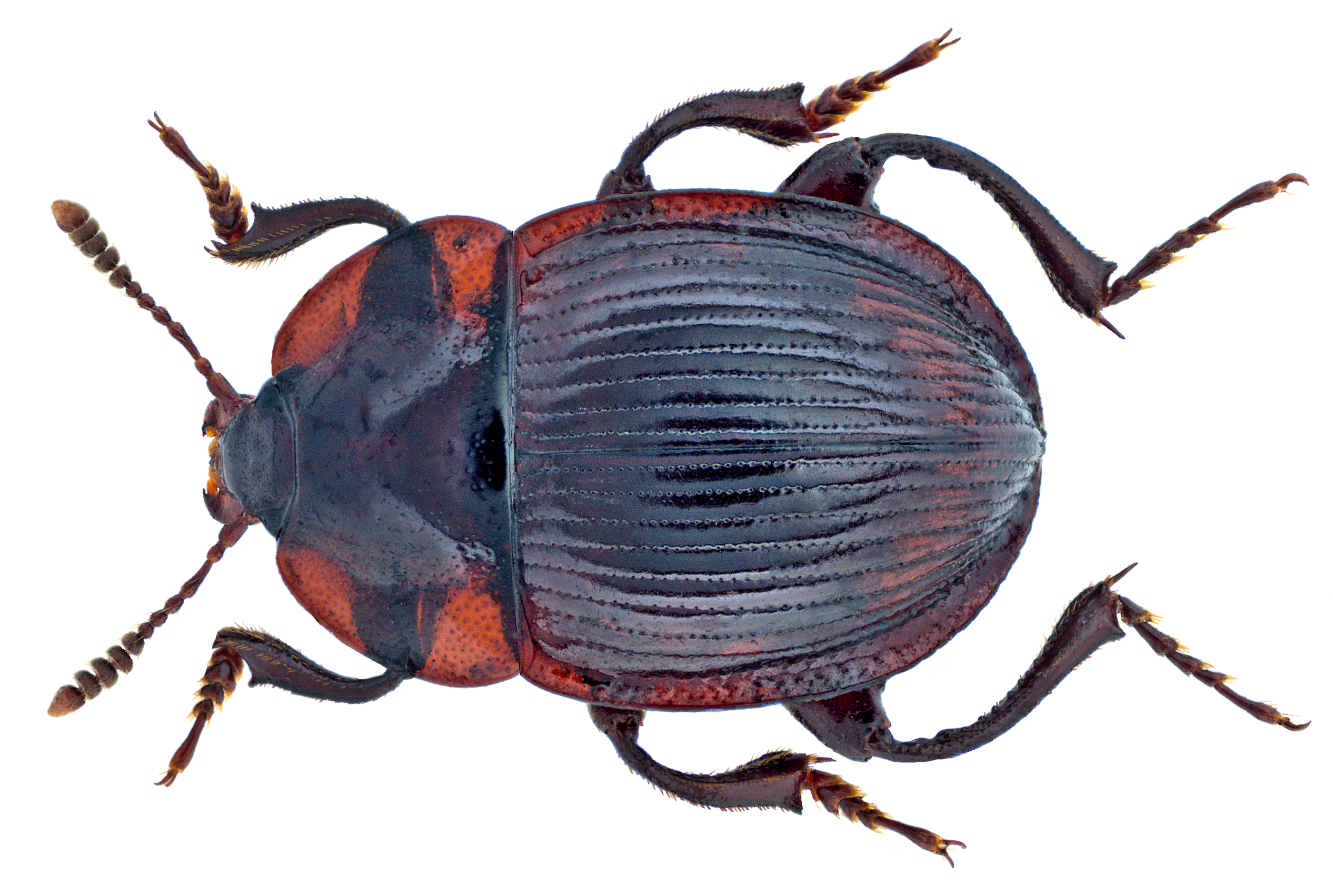
- Necrophilus subterraneus

Scientific classification
- Kingdom: Animalia
- Phylum: Arthropoda
- Class: Insecta
- Order: Coleoptera
- Suborder: Polyphaga
- Infraorder: Staphyliniformia
- Family: Agyrtidae
- Genus: Necrophilus; Latreille, 1829

= Necrophilus =

Genus of beetles

Necrophilus is a genus of primitive carrion beetles in the family Agyrtidae. There are at least three described species in Necrophilus.

== Species ==
These three species belong to the genus Necrophilus:

- Necrophilus hydrophiloides Guérin-Méneville, 1835 (flat brown scavenger beetle)
- Necrophilus pettiti Horn, 1880 (small scavenger beetle)
- Necrophilus subterraneus (Dahl, 1807)
