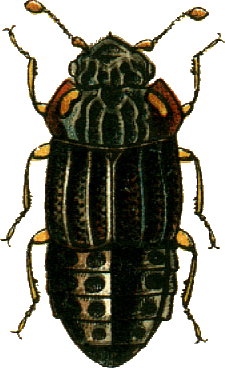
- Micropeplus fulvus

Scientific classification
- Kingdom: Animalia
- Phylum: Arthropoda
- Clade: Pancrustacea
- Class: Insecta
- Order: Coleoptera
- Suborder: Polyphaga
- Infraorder: Staphyliniformia
- Family: Staphylinidae
- Subfamily: Micropeplinae; Leach, 1815

= Micropeplinae =

Micropeplinae Temporal range: Cenomanian–Recent

Subfamily of beetles

The Micropeplinae are a subfamily of the Staphylinidae, rove beetles. Their antennae have 9 segments with single-segmented clubs. The tarsal formula is 4-4-4 (appearing as 3–3–3). They are found in leaf litter, near lake shores and marshy areas, in mammal and bird nests, probably as saprophages or mold feeders. In North America, two genera are known Kalissus LeConte 1874 (British Columbia and Washington) and Micropeplus Latreille, with 14 widespread species.

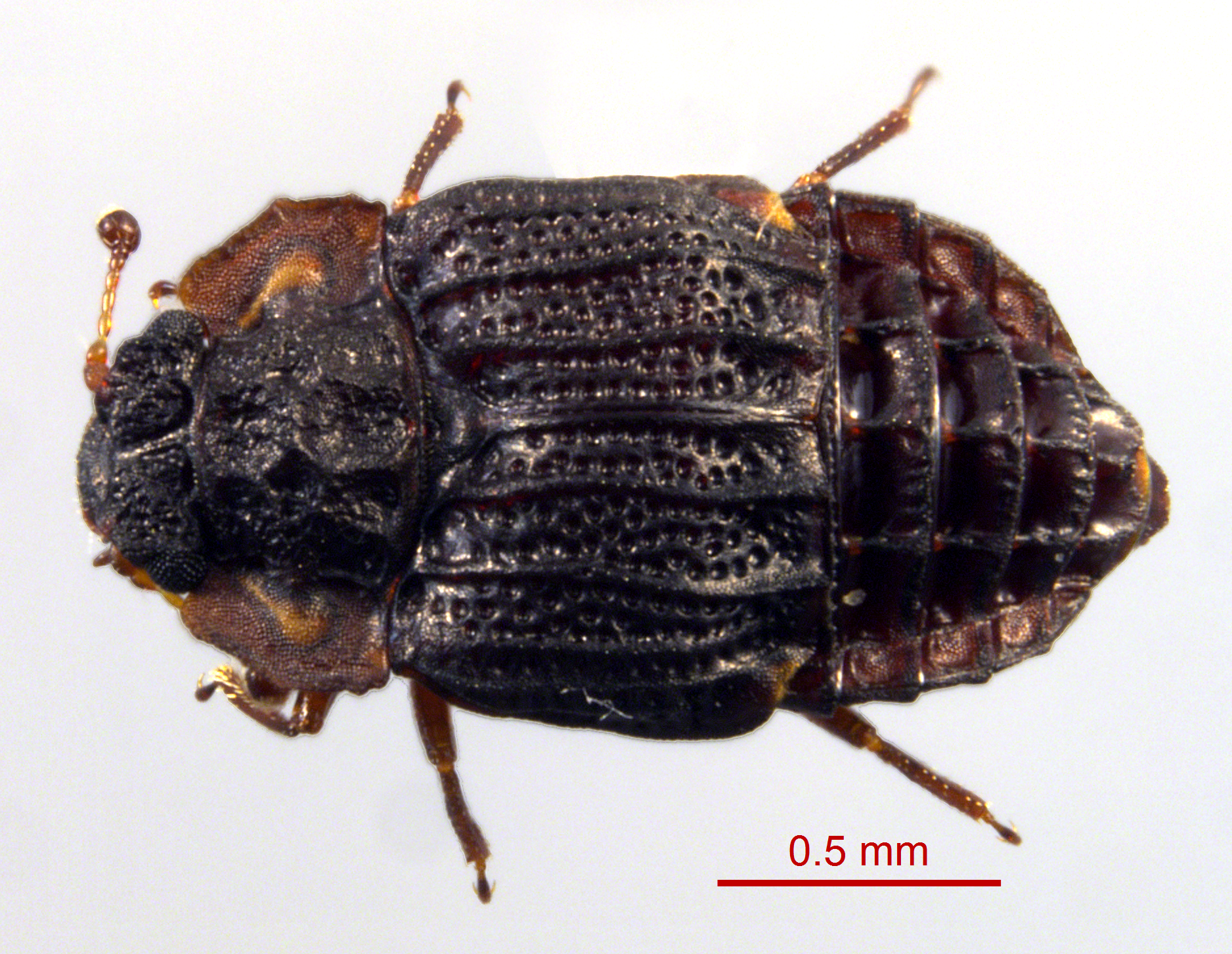
Micropeplus cribratus

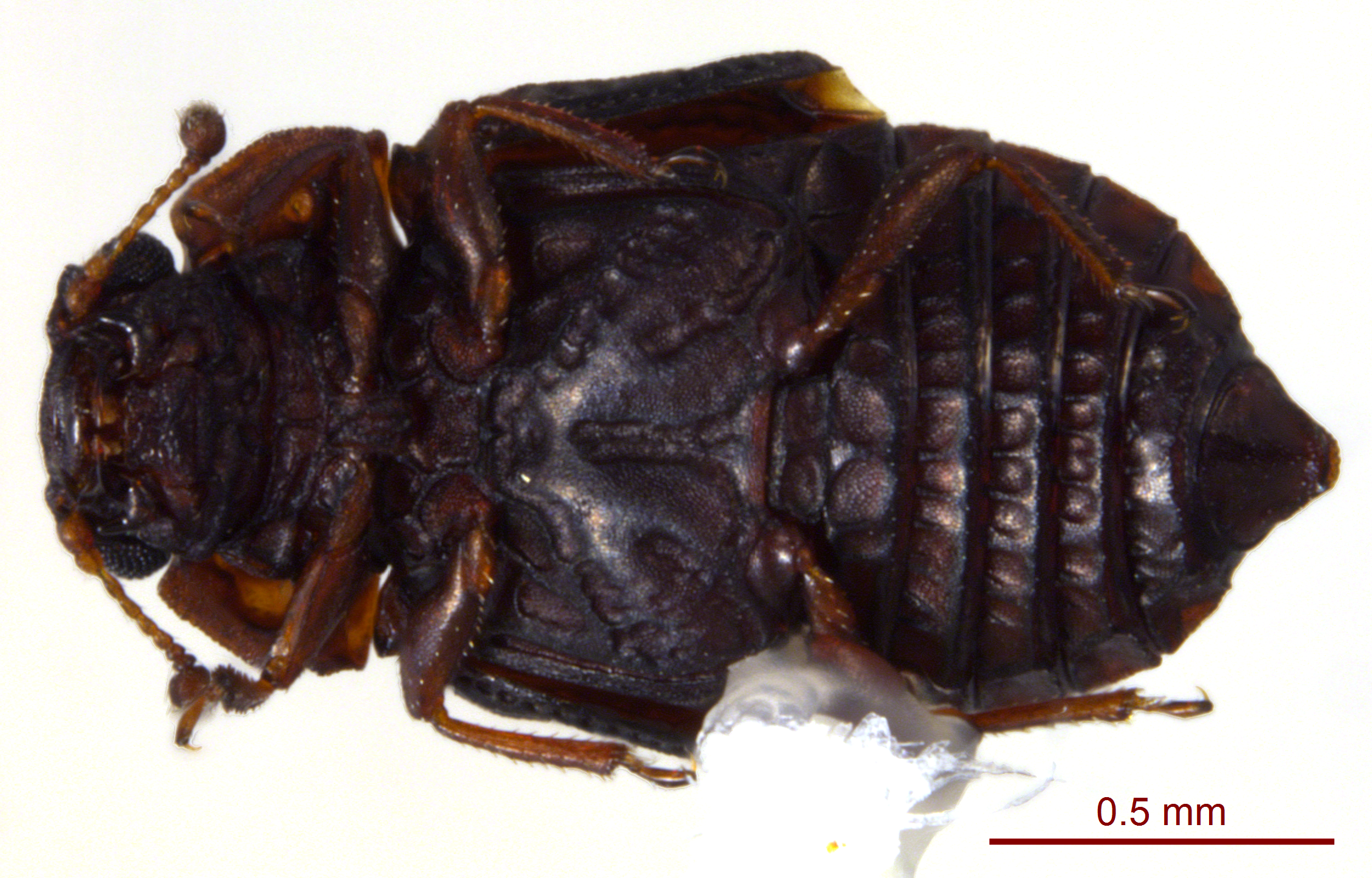
M. cribratus

== Genera ==
These genera belong to the subfamily Micropeplinae:

- Arrhenopeplus Koch, 1937^{g}
- Cerapeplus Löbl & Burckhardt, 1988^{c g}
- Kalissus Leconte, 1874^{g b}
- Micropeplus Latreille, 1809^{c g b}
- Peplomicrus Bernhauer, 1928^{c g}
- †Protopeplus Cai and Huang 2014 Burmese amber, Myanmar, Cenomanian

Data sources: i = ITIS, c = Catalogue of Life, g = GBIF, b = Bugguide.net
