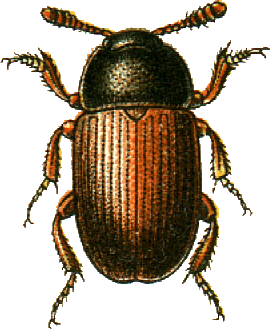
- Agyrtes castaneus

Scientific classification
- Kingdom: Animalia
- Phylum: Arthropoda
- Class: Insecta
- Order: Coleoptera
- Suborder: Polyphaga
- Infraorder: Staphyliniformia
- Family: Agyrtidae
- Genus: Agyrtes; Froelich, 1799

= Agyrtes =

Genus of beetles

Agyrtes is a genus of primitive carrion beetles in the family Agyrtidae. There are at least four described species in Agyrtes.

== Species ==
These four species belong to the genus Agyrtes:

- Agyrtes bicolor Laporte de Castelnau, 1840
- Agyrtes longulus (LeConte, 1859)
- Agyrtes primoticus Scudder, 1900
- Agyrtes similis Fall, 1937
