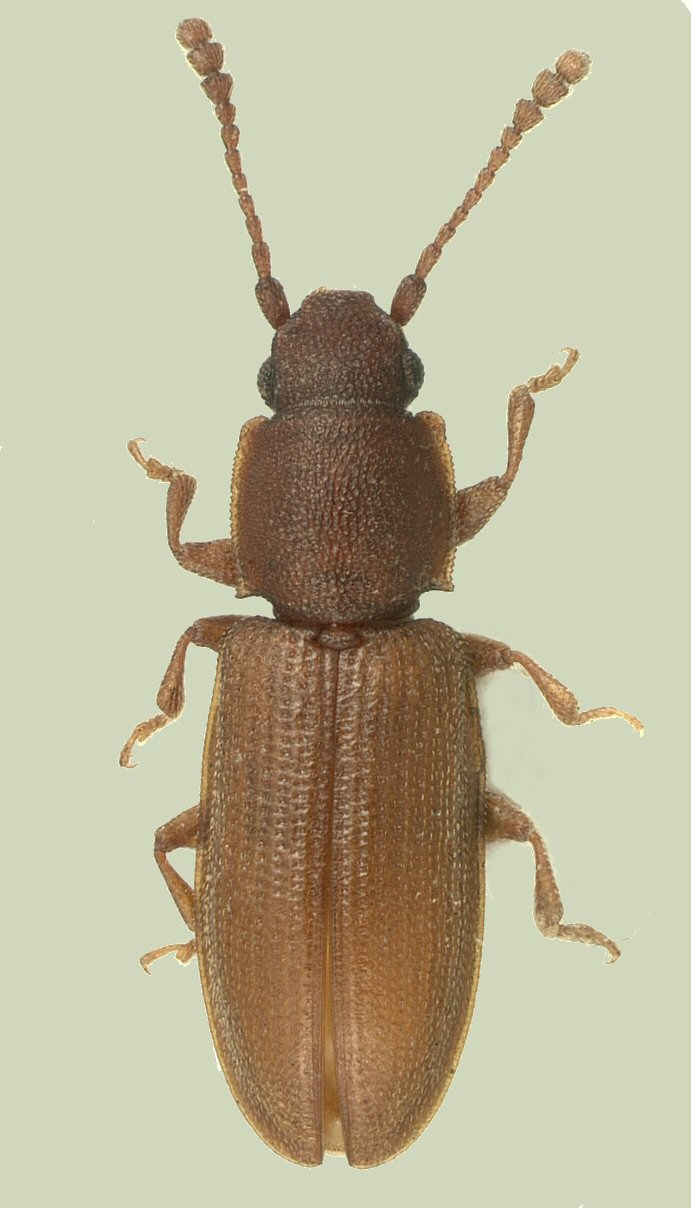

Scientific classification
- Kingdom: Animalia
- Phylum: Arthropoda
- Class: Insecta
- Order: Coleoptera
- Suborder: Polyphaga
- Infraorder: Cucujiformia
- Family: Silvanidae
- Genus: Ahasverus
- Species: A. longulus

Binomial name
- Ahasverus longulus (Blatchley, 1910)

Synonyms
- Ahasverus parviceps (Casey, 1916); Cathartus longulus Blatchley, 1910; Silvanus parviceps Casey, 1916

= Ahasverus longulus =

Species of beetle

Ahasverus longulus is a species of silvanid flat bark beetle in the family Silvanidae. It is found in North America.
