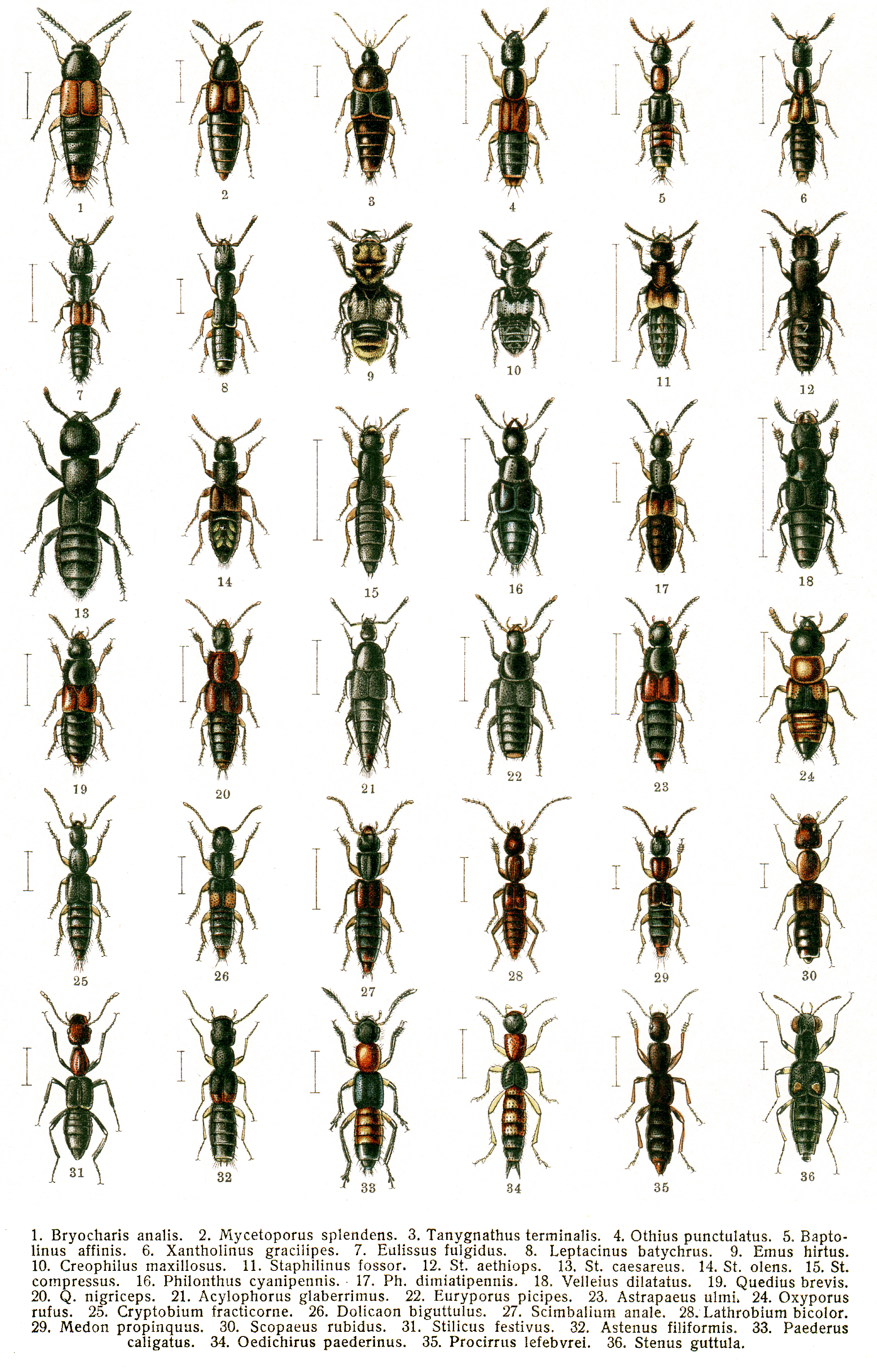
- Rove beetles of western Eurasia

Scientific classification
- Kingdom: Animalia
- Phylum: Arthropoda
- Clade: Pancrustacea
- Class: Insecta
- Order: Coleoptera
- Suborder: Polyphaga
- Infraorder: Staphyliniformia
- Superfamily: Staphylinoidea
- Family: Staphylinidae; Latreille, 1802

Subfamilies
- Aleocharinae; Apateticinae; Dasycerinae; Empelinae; Euaesthetinae; Glypholomatinae; Habrocerinae; Leptotyphlinae; Megalopsidiinae; Micropeplinae; Microsilphinae; Mycetoporinae; Neophoninae; Olisthaerinae; Omaliinae; Osoriinae; Oxyporinae; Oxytelinae; Paederinae; Phloeocharinae; Piestinae; † Protactinae; Proteininae; Protopselaphinae; Pselaphinae; Pseudopsinae; Scaphidiinae; Scydmaeninae; Silphinae; Solieriinae; Staphylininae; Steninae; Tachyporinae; Trichophyinae; Trigonurinae

= Rove beetle =

Rove beetles Temporal range: Middle Jurassic–Recent

Family of beetles

The rove beetles are a family (Staphylinidae) of beetles, primarily distinguished by their short elytra (wing covers) that typically leave more than half of their abdominal segments exposed. With over 68,000 species in approximately 4,100 genera, the group is one of the largest families in the beetle order and one of the largest families of organisms. They form an ancient group that first appeared during the Middle Jurassic based on definitive records of fossilized rove beetles, with the Late Triassic taxon Leehermania more likely belonging to the Myxophaga. They are an ecologically and morphologically diverse group of beetles and commonly are encountered in terrestrial ecosystems.

One well-known species is the devil's coach-horse beetle (Ocypus olens). For some other species, see list of British rove beetles.

The family was first described in 1802 by Pierre André Latreille.

== Anatomy ==
As might be expected for such a large family, considerable variation exists among the species. Sizes range from less than 1 to 35 mm (1.4 in), with most in the 2–8 mm range, and the form is generally elongated, with some rove beetles being ovoid in shape. Colors range from yellow and red to reddish-brown to brown to black to iridescent blue and green. The antennae usually have 11 segments and are filiform, with moderate clubbing in some genera. The abdomen may be very long and flexible, and some rove beetles superficially resemble earwigs. In the subfamilies Paederinae, Euaesthetinae, and Osoriinae, and partially in the Steninae, the tergum and sternum on the visible abdominal segments have fused, making each segment ring-shaped.

Due to their small elytra, these beetles have to fold their wings into a sort of origami shape. They are nevertheless good at flying.

Rove beetle folding wings

Some rove beetles, including members of Antimerus and Phanolinus, are metallic in appearance.

Some members of the Paederina (specifically the genus Paederus), a subtribe of the Paederinae, contain a potent vesicant in their haemolymph that can produce a skin irritation in humans called dermatitis linearis, also known as Paederus dermatitis. The irritant pederin is highly toxic, more potent than cobra venom.

== Ecology ==
Rove beetles are known from every type of habitat in which beetles occur, and their diets include just about everything except the living tissues of higher plants, but now including higher plants with the discovery of the diet of Himalusa thailandensis. Most rove beetles are predators of insects and other invertebrates, living in forest leaf litter and similar decaying plant matter. They are also commonly found under stones and around freshwater margins. Almost 400 species are known to live on ocean shores that are submerged at high tide, including the pictured rove beetle, although these are much fewer than 1% of the worldwide total of Staphylinidae. Other species have adapted to live as inquilines in ant and termite colonies, and some live in mutualistic relationships with mammals whereby they eat fleas and other parasites, benefiting the host. A few species, notably those of the genus Aleochara, are scavengers and carrion feeders or are parasitoids of other insects, particularly of certain fly pupae. To profit from their alleged advantages, several of the Staphylinidae have been transferred into Italy, Hawaii, the continental United States, and Easter Island by practitioners. Another advantage of rove beetles is their sensitivity to changes in the environment, such as habitat alteration. This means they have potential as an ecological disturbance indicator in human-dominated environments.

Although rove beetles' appetites for other insects would seem to make them obvious candidates for biological control of pests, and empirically they are believed to be important controls in the wild, experiments using them notably have not been successful. Greater success is seen with those species that are parasitoids (genus Aleochara).

Rove beetles of the genus Stenus are specialist predators of small invertebrates such as springtails (Collembola). Their labia can shoot out from the head using blood pressure. The thin rod of the labium ends in a pad of bristly hairs and hooks and between these hairs are small pores that exude an adhesive glue-like substance, which sticks to prey.

Meanwhile, many rove beetles within Scydmaeninae almost exclusively prey on heavily armoured oribatid mites. Species within the tribe Cephenniini use specialised suckers derived from their mouthparts to hold onto the mite’s exoskeleton while grinding a hole in its cuticle with their mandibles and sucking out the mite’s flesh.

Hairy rove beetles (Creophilus maxillosus) at 4 days and larva at 7 days under rabbit carrion

== Systematics ==
Classification of the 63,650 (as of 2018) staphylinid species is on going and controversial, with some workers proposing an organization of as many as 10 separate families, but the current favored system is one of 32 subfamilies, about 167 tribes (some grouped into supertribes), and about 3,200 genera. About 400 new species are being described each year, and some estimates suggest three-quarters of tropical species are as yet undescribed.

== Gallery ==
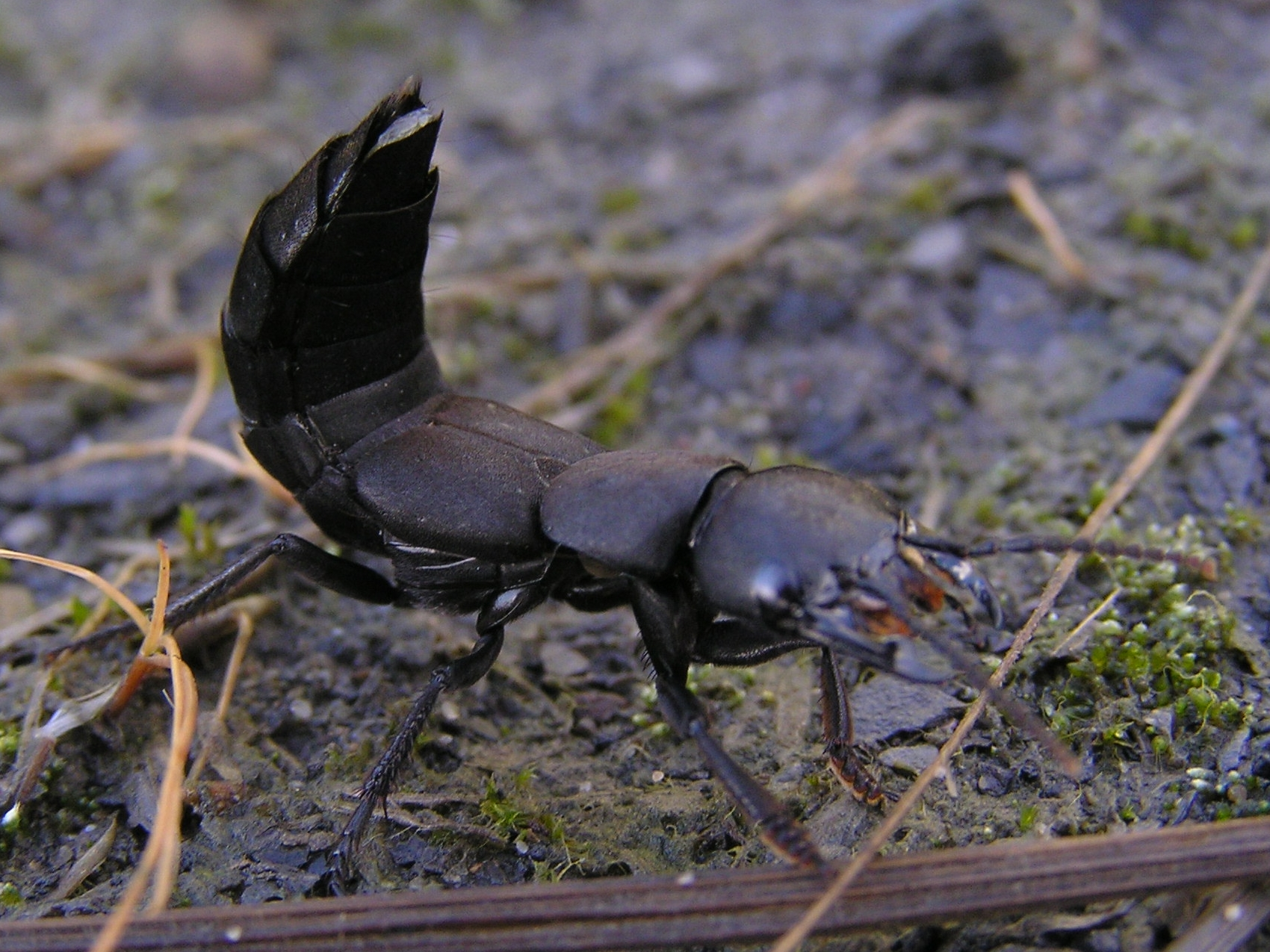
Ocypus sp.

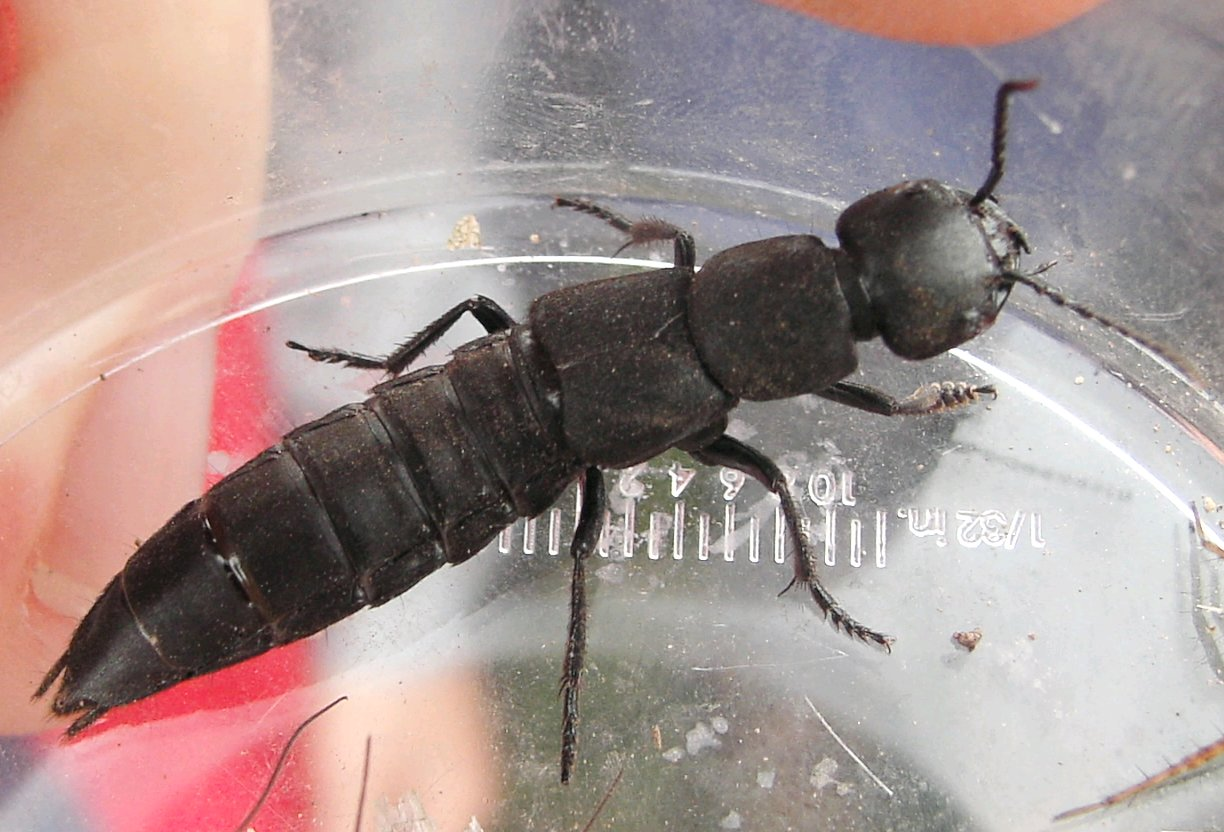
Ocypus olens

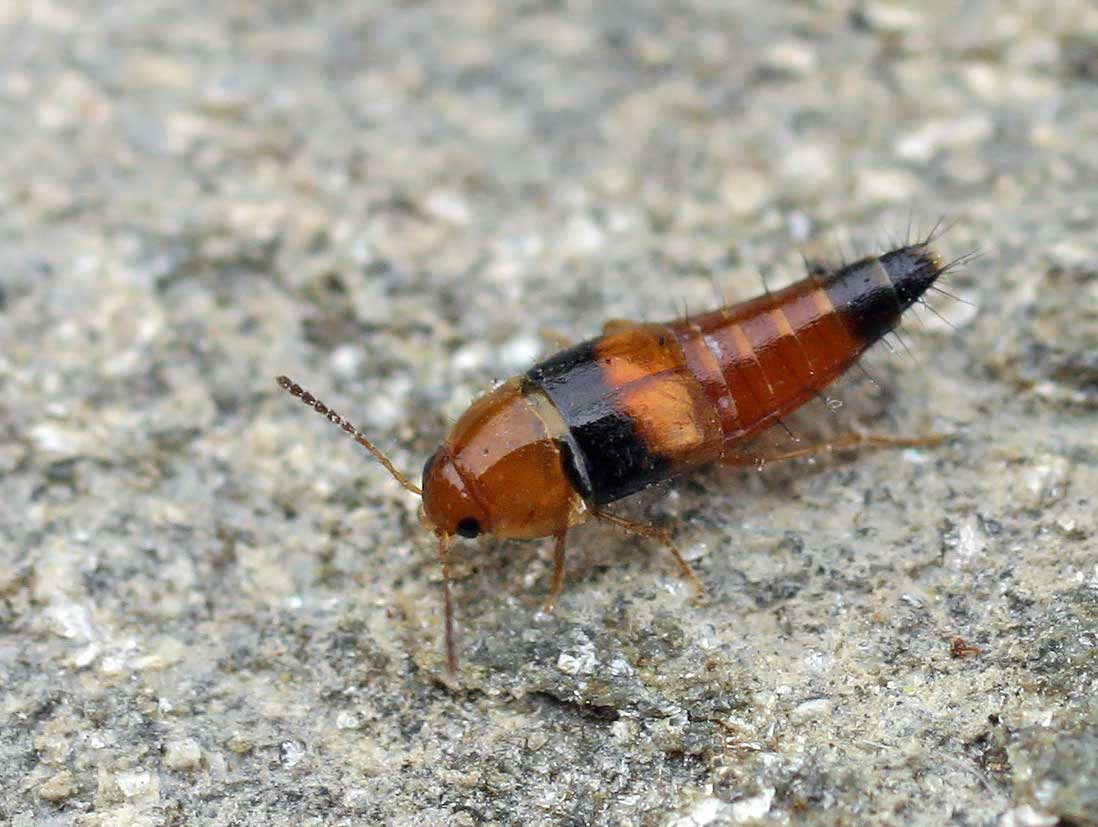
Tachyporus obtusus

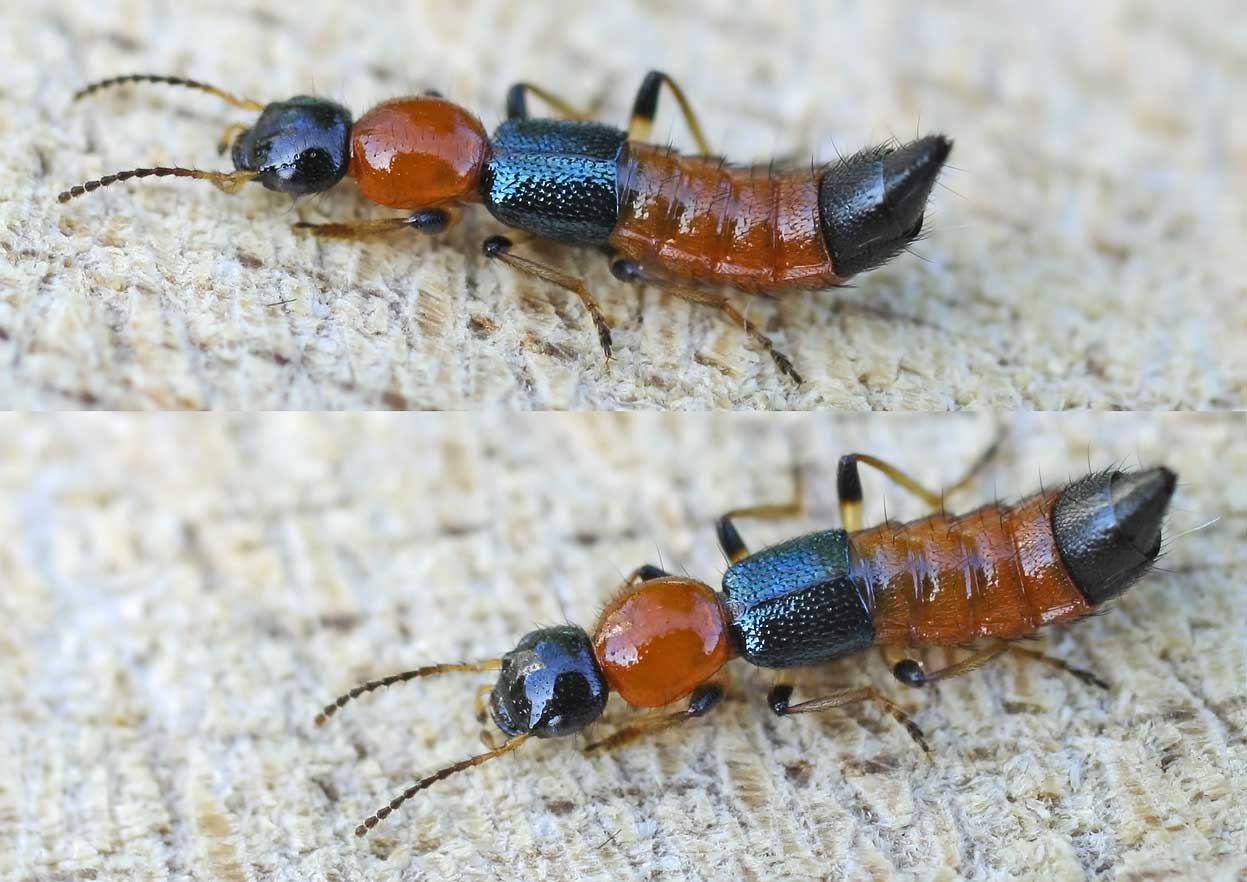
Paederus littoralis also known as Charlie ants

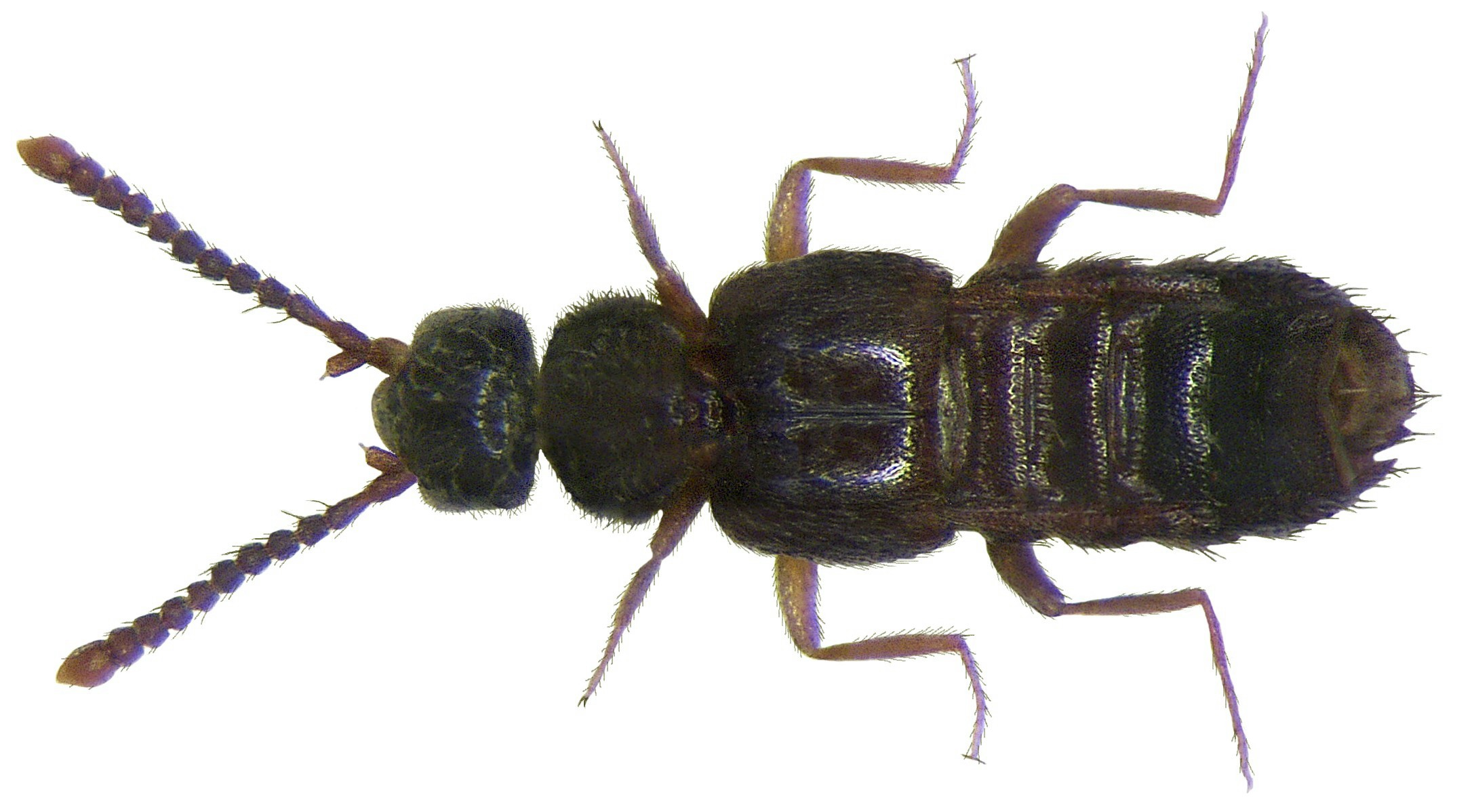
Cordalia tsavoana

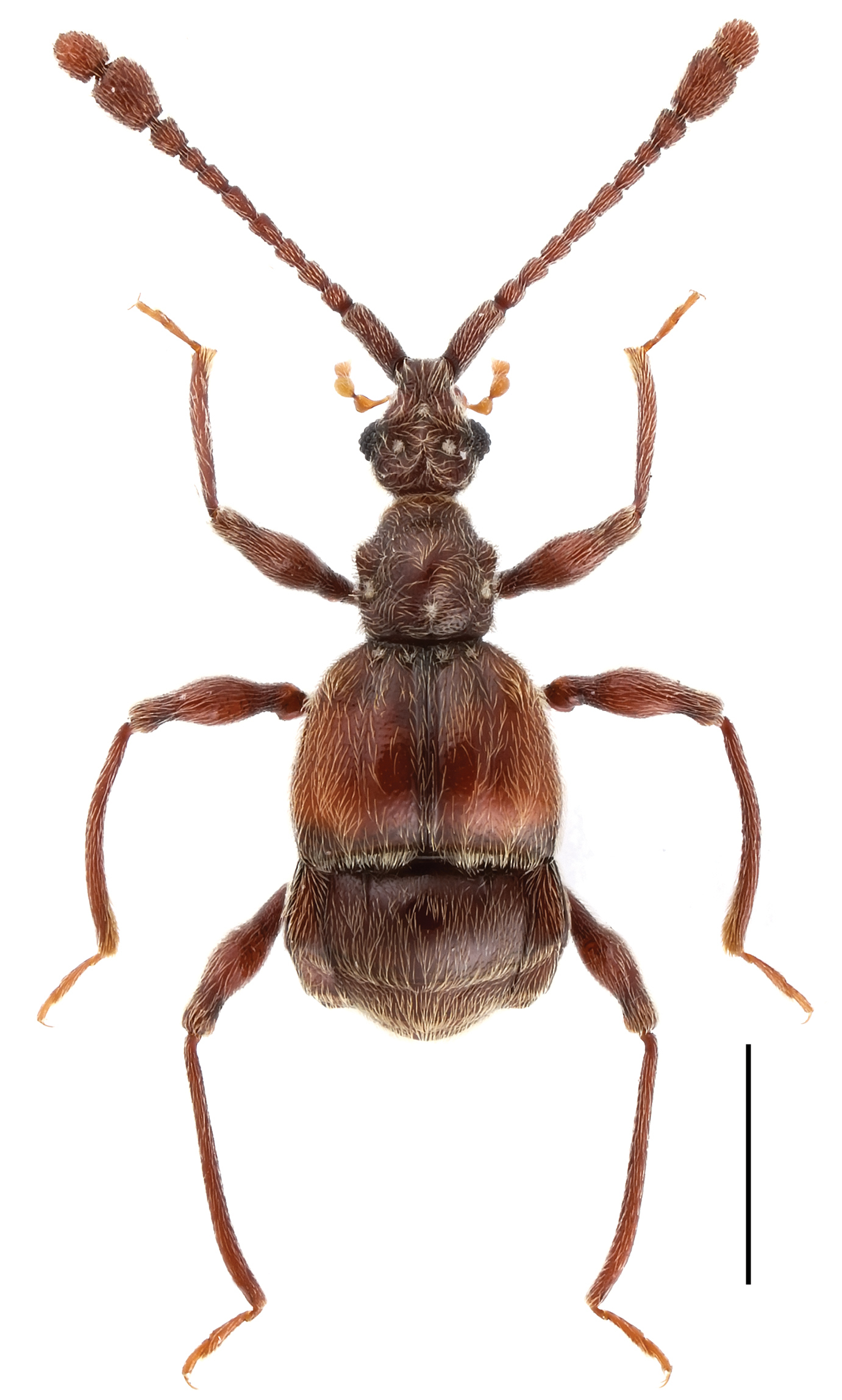
Taiwanophodes minor

== Important works ==
For the Palaearctic fauna, the most up-to-date works are:

- Lohse, G.A. (1964) Familie: Staphylinidae. In: Freude, H., Harde, K.W. & Lohse, G.A. (Eds.), Die Käfer Mitteleuropas. Band 4, Staphylinidae I (Micropeplinae bis Tachyporinae). Krefeld: Goecke & Evers Verlag, 264 pp.
- Lohse, G.A. (1974) Familie: Staphylinidae. In: Freude, H., Harde, K.W. & Lohse, G.A. (Eds.), Die Käfer Mitteleuropas. Band 5, Staphylinidae II (Hypocyphtinae und Aleocharinae). Pselaphidae. Krefeld: Goecke & Evers Verlag, 381 pp.
- Lohse, G.A. (1989) Ergänzungen und Berichtigungen zu Freude-Harde-Lohse "Die Käfer Mitteleuropas" Band 5 (1974), pp. 185–243 In: Lohse, G.A. & Lucht, W.H. (Eds.), Die Käfer Mitteleuropas. 1. Supplementband mit Katalogteil. Krefeld: Goecke & Evers Verlag, pp. 185–243.

== Regional works ==
Europe

- Lott, D.A. (2009). The Staphylinidae (rove beetles) of Britain and Ireland. Part 5: Scaphidiinae, Piestinae, Oxytelinae. Handbooks for the identification of British insects, vol. 12, part 5. St Albans: Royal Entomological Society. British and Irish fauna only
- Tronquet, M. (2006). Catalogue iconographique des Coléoptères des Pyrénées-Orientales. Vol. 1: Staphylinidae. Supplément au Tome XV de la Revue de l’Association Roussillonnaise d’Entomologie. Perpignan: Association Roussillonnaise d’Entomologie.Extensively illustrated
