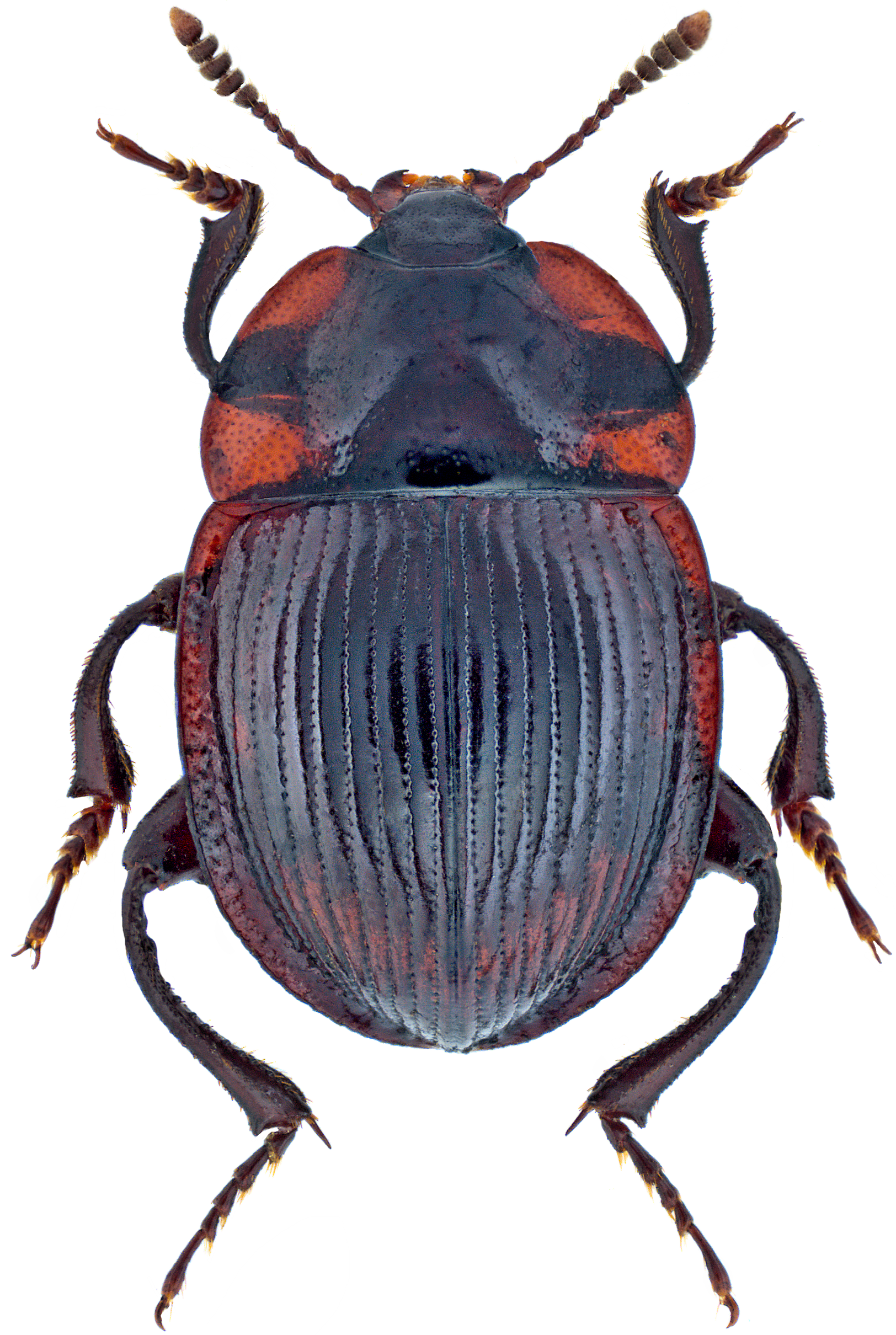
- Necrophilus subterraneus (Necrophillinae)
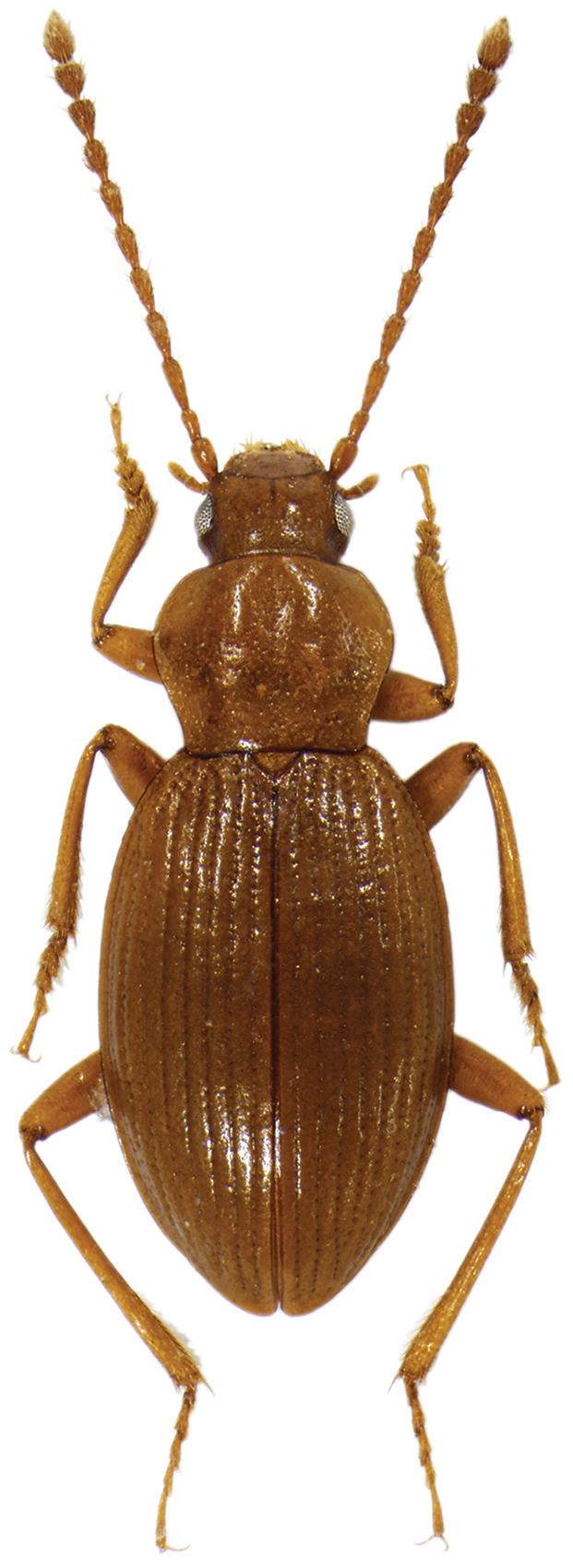
- Male specimen of Lyrosoma pallidum (Agyrtinae)

Scientific classification
- Kingdom: Animalia
- Phylum: Arthropoda
- Clade: Pancrustacea
- Class: Insecta
- Order: Coleoptera
- Suborder: Polyphaga
- Infraorder: Staphyliniformia
- Superfamily: Staphylinoidea
- Family: Agyrtidae; Thomson, 1859

Subfamilies
- Agyrtinae; Necrophilinae; Pterolomatinae

= Agyrtidae =

Agyrtidae Temporal range: Aptian–Recent

Family of beetles

Agyrtidae, or primitive carrion beetles, are a small family of beetles belonging to Staphylinoidea. They are found in mostly temperate areas of the Northern Hemisphere and in New Zealand.

== Characteristics ==
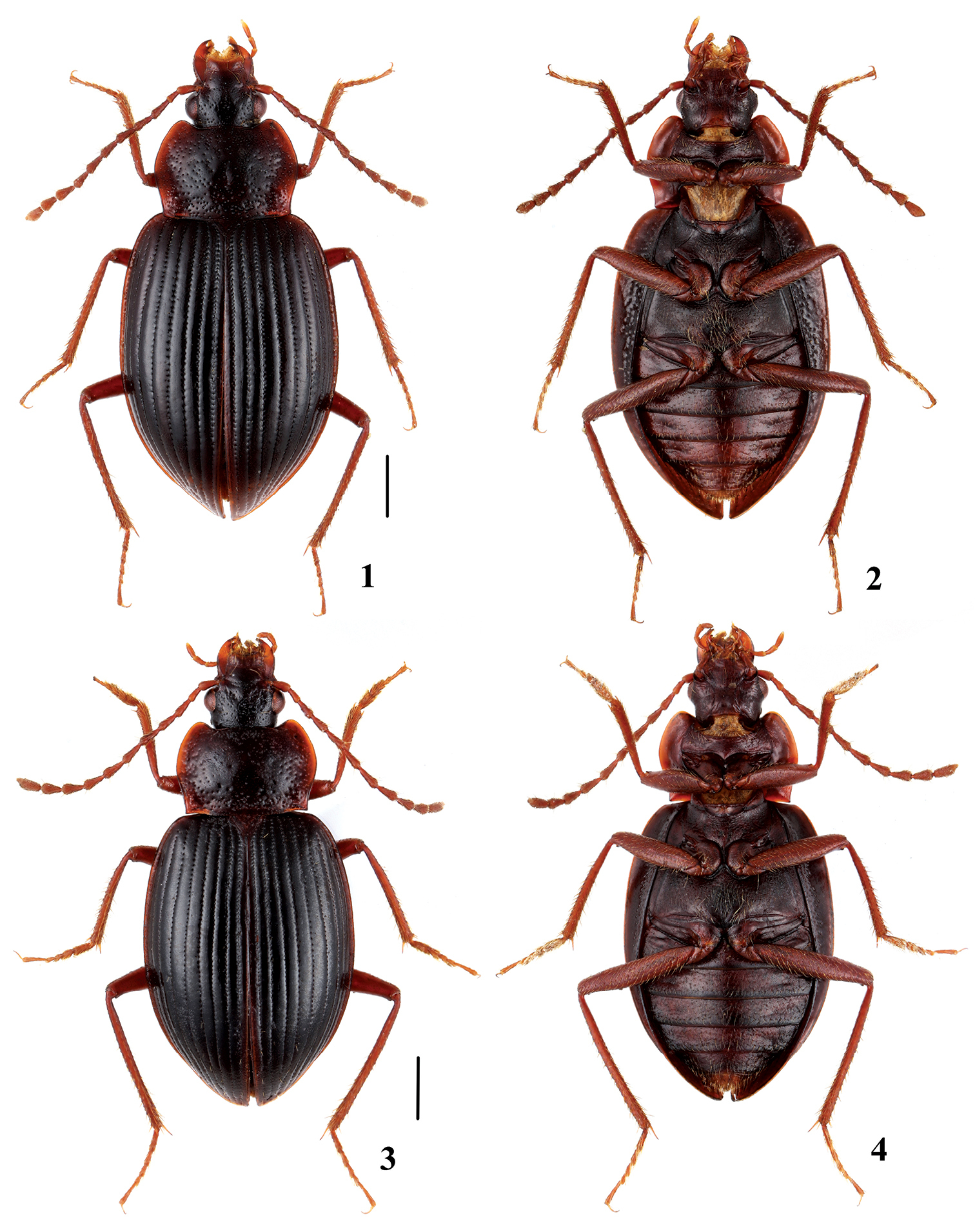
Female (top) and male (bottom) specimens of Apteroloma (Pterolomatinae)

Agyrtidae are small or middle-sized beetles (length 4–14 mm). They have usually oval body, but the Pterolomatinae are superficially similar to ground beetles. Abdomen is with five visible ventral sclerites, procoxal cavities internally open. Hindwings have anal lobe but no radial hinge.

== Ecology ==
The group have a diverse ecological habits, but appear to be mostly saprophagous. Necrophilinae is attracted to decaying material including carrion, rotting fungi and dung, in the vicinity of temperate forests. Agyrtinae have a diverse variety of habits, with the genus Lyrosoma being found on cold beaches of the North Pacific rim, where they have been found feeding on kelp and dead seabirds, while Ipelates is associated with decaying logs and fungi, leaf litter, vegetation and flowers. Pterolomatinae appears to be active predators, with Pteroloma having been found in wet and boggy habitats, especially cold mountain streams. Some Apteroloma species are found abundantly in mountain habitats, while others are found in open or forested areas.

== Fossil record ==
The oldest unambiguous members of the family are from the Early Cretaceous of Asia, including Ponomarenkia from the Turga Formation and Palаeonecrophilus from the Khasurty locality, both of which are located in Buryatia in Russia, and date the Aptian stage (~125–113 million years ago). The latter can be assigned to the modern subfamily Necrophilinae. Earlier claimed Jurassic records, such as Mesagyrtes and Mesecanus from the Middle Jurassic of China, require re-evaluation.

== Systematics ==
Currently, about 60 species are known. The family is divided into three subfamilies:

- Agyrtinae
  - Agyrtes (Nearctic, Palearctic, Oriental realms)
  - Ecanus (Palearctic)
  - Ipelates (Palearctic, Oriental realms)
  - Lyrosoma (coasts of northern Eastern Asia and north-westerrn North America)
- Necrophilinae
  - Necrophilus (Western Palearctic, Oriental, and Nearctic)
  - Zeanecrophilus (New Zealand)
- Pterolomatinae
  - Apteroloma (Nearctic, Palearctic, Neotropical, Oriental Realms)
  - Pteroloma (Nearctic, Palearctic)

Until recently, species of this family had been included in the family Silphidae (as tribes Lyrosomatini and Agyrtini), but are now considered more closely related to the family Leiodidae.
