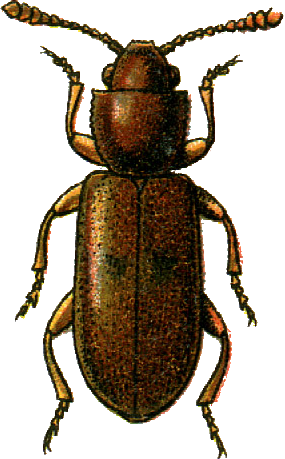
- Monanus concinnulus

Scientific classification
- Domain: Eukaryota
- Kingdom: Animalia
- Phylum: Arthropoda
- Class: Insecta
- Order: Coleoptera
- Suborder: Polyphaga
- Infraorder: Cucujiformia
- Family: Silvanidae
- Subfamily: Silvaninae; Kirby, 1837

= Silvaninae =

Subfamily of beetles

Silvaninae is a subfamily of silvanid flat bark beetles in the family Silvanidae. There are about 11 genera and at least 30 described species in Silvaninae.

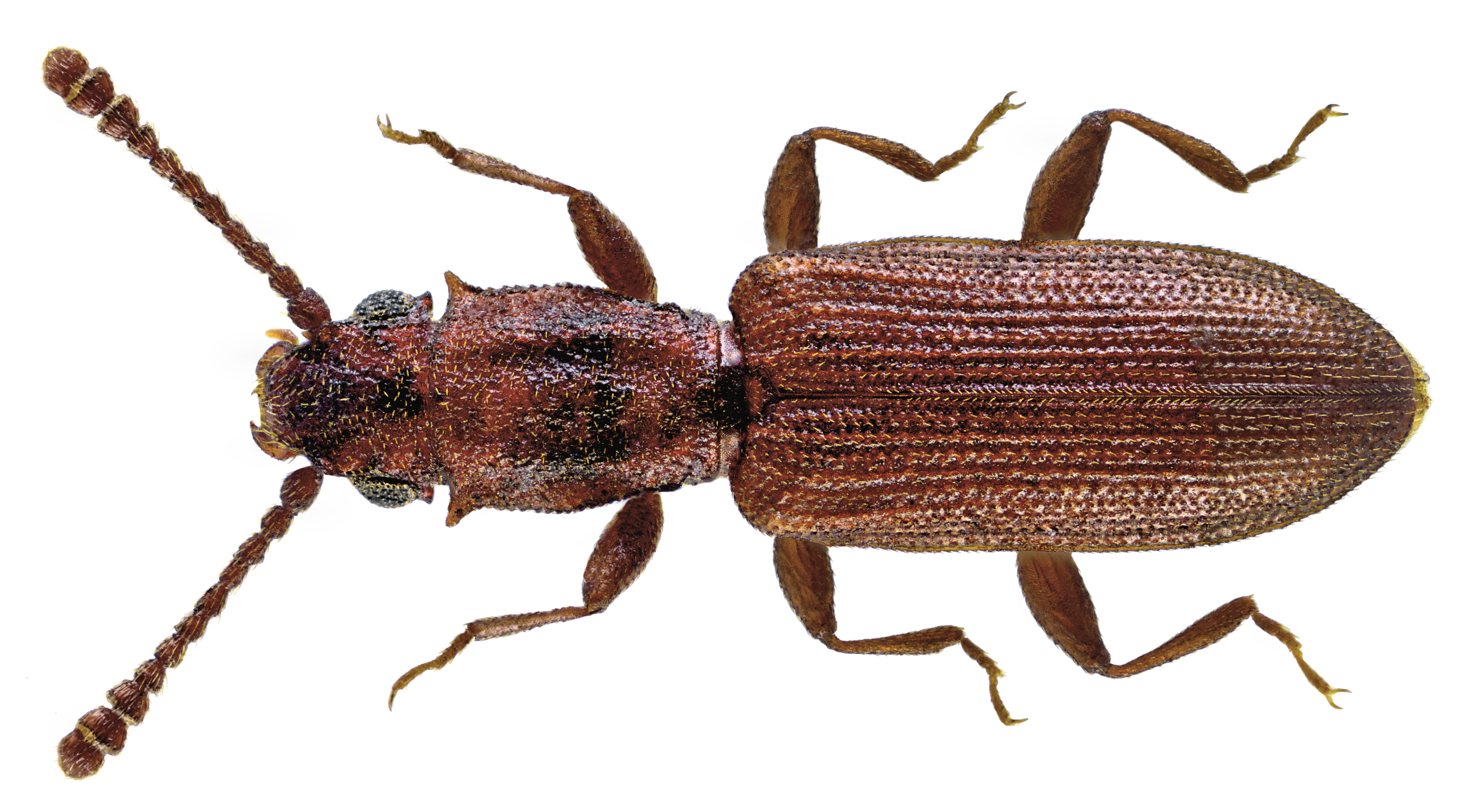
Silvanus bidentatus

== Genera ==
- Ahasverus Gozis, 1881
- Airaphilus Redtenbacher, 1858
- Cathartosilvanus Grouvelle, 1912
- Cathartus Reiche, 1854
- Eunausibius Grouvelle, 1912
- Monanus Sharp, 1879
- Nausibius Lentz, 1857
- Oryzaephilus Ganglbauer, 1899
- Pensus Halstead, 1973
- Silvanoprus Reitter, 1911
- Silvanus Latreille, 1804
