= Silvanoprus distinguendus =

Scientific classification
- Kingdom: Animalia
- Phylum: Arthropoda
- Class: Insecta
- Order: Coleoptera
- Suborder: Polyphaga
- Infraorder: Cucujiformia
- Family: Silvanidae
- Genus: Silvanoprus
- Species: S. distinguendus

Binomial name
- Silvanoprus distinguendus Sen Gupta & Pal, 1996

Species of beetle

Silvanoprus distinguendus, is a species of silvan flat bark beetle native to India and Sri Lanka. It is also introduced to Belarus.

== Description ==
Average length is about 2.63 to 2.68 mm. Very similar to Silvanoprus longicollis.
