= Cathartosilvanus imbellis =

Scientific classification
- Kingdom: Animalia
- Phylum: Arthropoda
- Class: Insecta
- Order: Coleoptera
- Suborder: Polyphaga
- Infraorder: Cucujiformia
- Family: Silvanidae
- Genus: Cathartosilvanus
- Species: C. imbellis

Binomial name
- Cathartosilvanus imbellis (LeConte, 1854)

Synonyms
- Cathartosilvanus communis (Grouvelle, 1878); Silvanus communis Grouvelle, 1878; Silvanus imbellis LeConte, 1854

Species of beetle

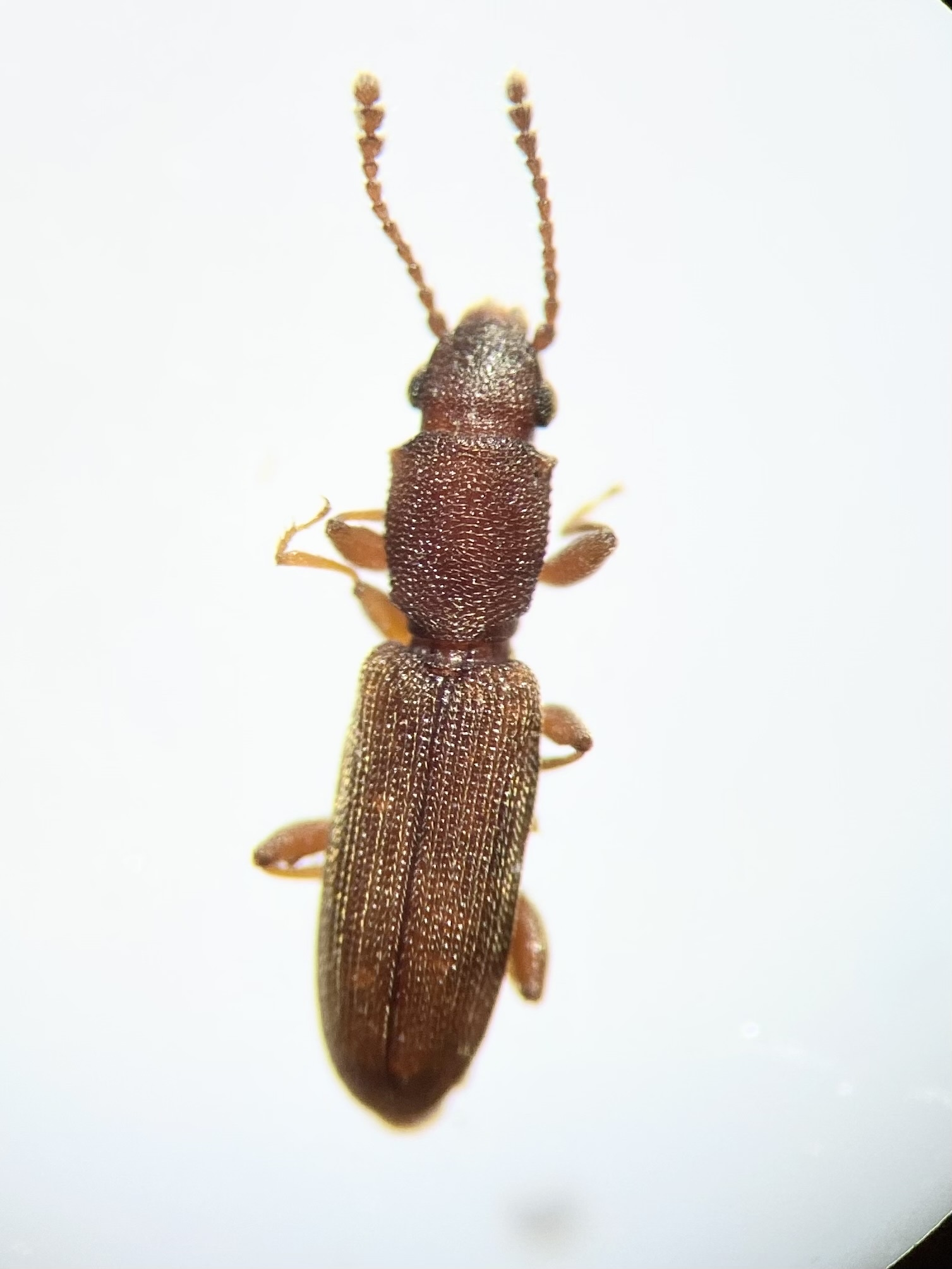

Cathartosilvanus imbellis is a species of silvanid flat bark beetle in the family Silvanidae. It is found in North America.
