= Psammoecus delicatus =

Scientific classification
- Kingdom: Animalia
- Phylum: Arthropoda
- Class: Insecta
- Order: Coleoptera
- Suborder: Polyphaga
- Infraorder: Cucujiformia
- Family: Silvanidae
- Genus: Psammoecus
- Species: P. delicatus

Binomial name
- Psammoecus delicatus Grouvelle, 1908

Species of beetle

Psammoecus delicatus, is a species of silvan flat bark beetle. It can be found in India, Sri Lanka, Taiwan, Singapore, and Indonesia.

== Description ==
Average length is about 2.38 to 2.98 mm.
