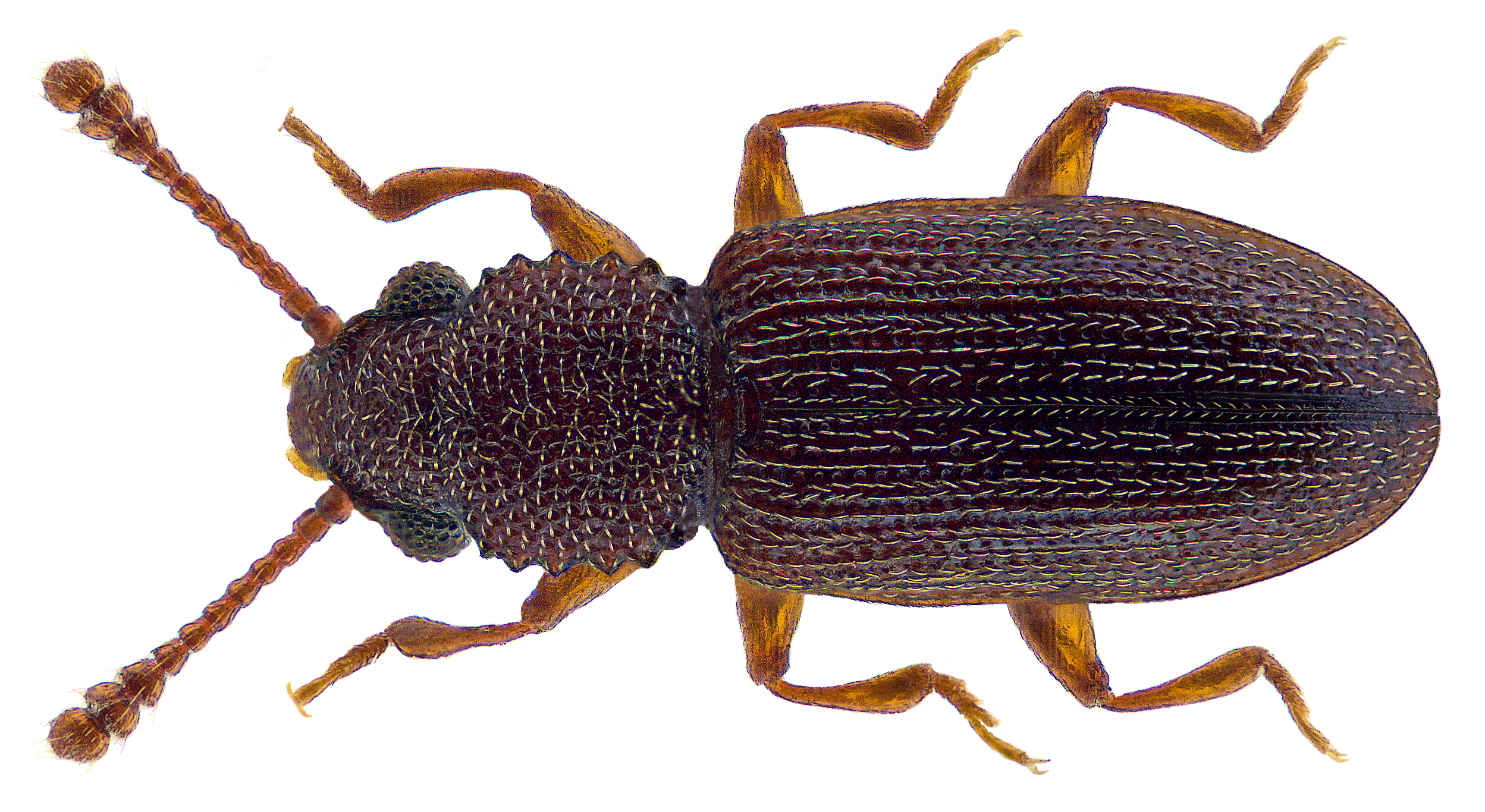

Scientific classification
- Kingdom: Animalia
- Phylum: Arthropoda
- Clade: Pancrustacea
- Class: Insecta
- Order: Coleoptera
- Suborder: Polyphaga
- Infraorder: Cucujiformia
- Family: Silvanidae
- Genus: Silvanolomus
- Species: S. denticollis

Binomial name
- Silvanolomus denticollis (Reitter, 1876)

Synonyms
- Silvanus denticollis Reitter, 1876; Silvanopsis denticollis Reitter, 1911

= Silvanolomus denticollis =

Species of beetle

Silvanolomus denticollis, is a species of silvan flat bark beetle native to India (West Bengal, Bihar, Madhya Pradesh and Tamil ladu), Sri Lanka, Sumatra and Borneo.

== Description ==
Average length is about 1.61 to 1.94 mm.
