= Protosilvanus granosus =

Scientific classification
- Kingdom: Animalia
- Phylum: Arthropoda
- Class: Insecta
- Order: Coleoptera
- Suborder: Polyphaga
- Infraorder: Cucujiformia
- Family: Silvanidae
- Genus: Protosilvanus
- Species: P. granosus

Binomial name
- Protosilvanus granosus (Grouvelle, 1897)

Synonyms
- Silvanus granosus Grouvelle, 1897; Silvanus (Protosilvanus) granosus Grouvelle, 1912; Protosilvanus granosus Halstead, 1973

Species of beetle

Protosilvanus granosus, is a species of silvan flat bark beetle found in India, Sri Lanka, Malaysia, Singapore, Indonesia, Philippines and Solomon Islands.

== Description ==
Average length of the adult is about 2.3 to 2.9 mm.
