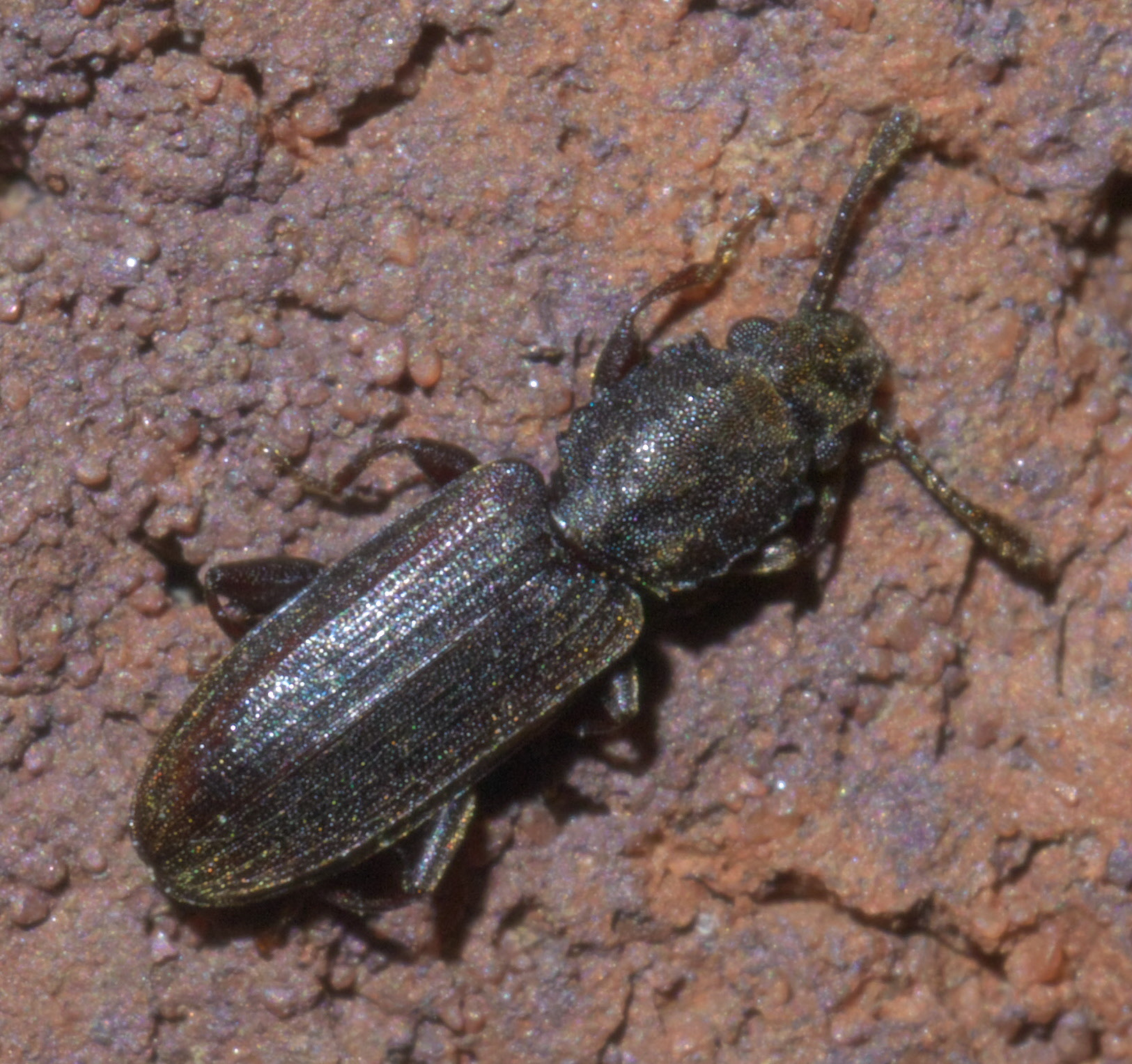

Scientific classification
- Kingdom: Animalia
- Phylum: Arthropoda
- Class: Insecta
- Order: Coleoptera
- Suborder: Polyphaga
- Infraorder: Cucujiformia
- Family: Silvanidae
- Genus: Nausibius
- Species: N. major

Binomial name
- Nausibius major Zimmermann, 1869

= Nausibius major =

Species of beetle

Nausibius major is a species of silvanid flat bark beetle in the family Silvanidae. It is found in Central America and North America.

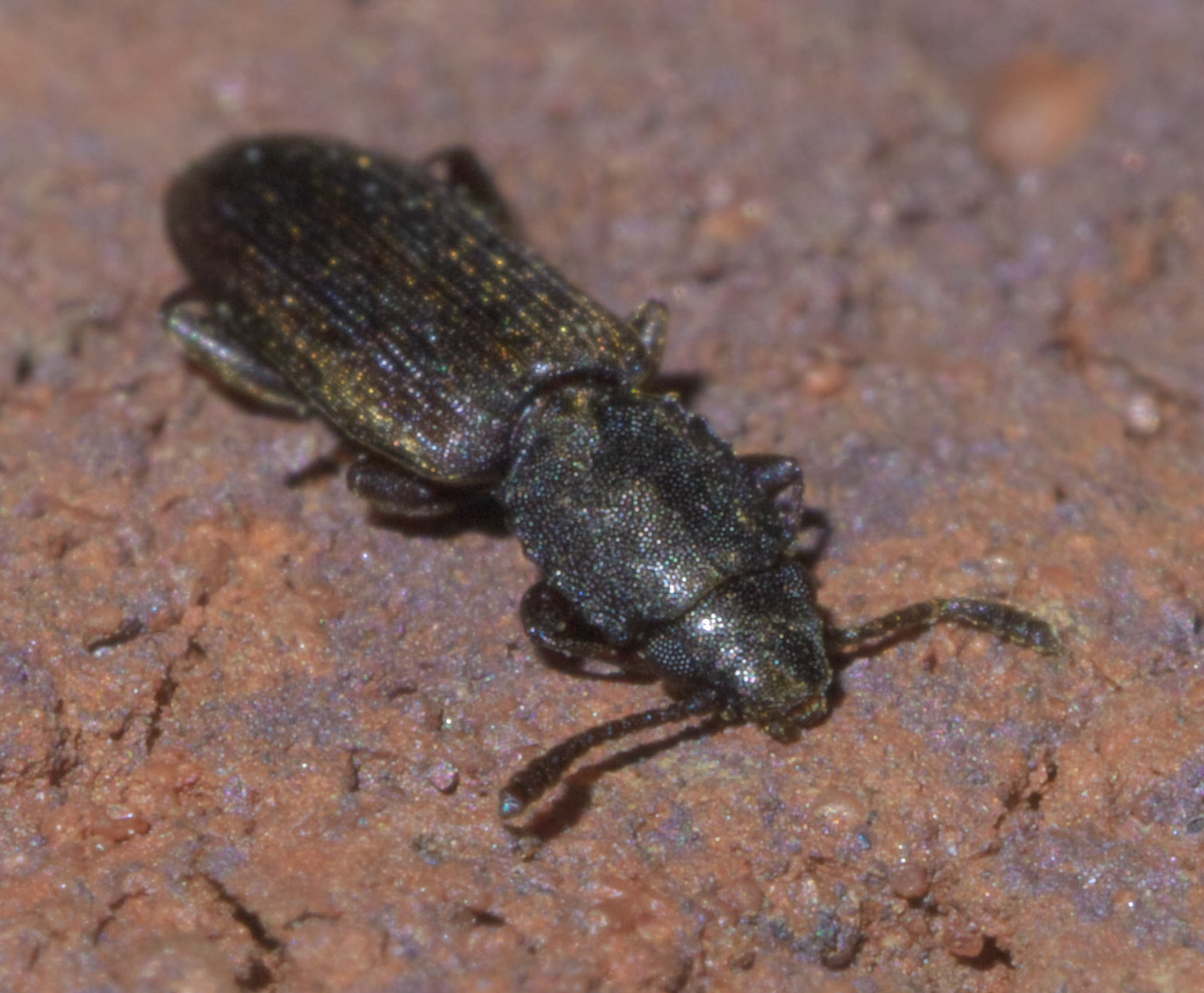
