= Silvanoprus angusticollis =

Scientific classification
- Kingdom: Animalia
- Phylum: Arthropoda
- Class: Insecta
- Order: Coleoptera
- Suborder: Polyphaga
- Infraorder: Cucujiformia
- Family: Silvanidae
- Genus: Silvanoprus
- Species: S. angusticollis

Binomial name
- Silvanoprus angusticollis (Reitter, 1876)

Synonyms
- Silvanus angusticollis Reitter, 1876

Species of beetle

Silvanoprus angusticollis is a species in the family Silvanidae ("silvanid flat bark beetles"), in the order Coleoptera ("beetles"). It is found in North America.
