= Dendrophagus cygnaei =

Scientific classification
- Kingdom: Animalia
- Phylum: Arthropoda
- Class: Insecta
- Order: Coleoptera
- Suborder: Polyphaga
- Infraorder: Cucujiformia
- Family: Silvanidae
- Genus: Dendrophagus
- Species: D. cygnaei

Binomial name
- Dendrophagus cygnaei Mannerheim, 1846

Synonyms
- Dendrophagus americanus LeConte, 1850; Dendrophagus glaber Mannerheim, 1853

Species of beetle

Dendrophagus cygnaei is a species in the family Silvanidae ("silvanid flat bark beetles"), in the order Coleoptera ("beetles"). Dendrophagus cygnaei is found in North America.
