= Psammoecus trimaculatus =

Scientific classification
- Kingdom: Animalia
- Phylum: Arthropoda
- Class: Insecta
- Order: Coleoptera
- Suborder: Polyphaga
- Infraorder: Cucujiformia
- Family: Silvanidae
- Genus: Psammoecus
- Species: P. trimaculatus

Binomial name
- Psammoecus trimaculatus Motschulsky, 1858

Synonyms
- Cucujus incommodus Walker, 1859; Telephanlls cruciger Waterhouse, 1876

Species of beetle

Psammoecus trimaculatus, is a species of silvan flat bark beetle native to Afro-Oriental region, but introduced to many parts of the world.

== Distribution ==
In Asia, the species is recorded from India, Sri Lanka, Nepal, Bhutan, Myanmar, Japan, and Malaysia. There are some reports from New Guinea and Australia about the possibility of the species. In Africa, it can be found in Tanzania, Uganda, and South Africa, as well as Madagascar, Mauritius and Réunion. Apart from that, the beetle is found in Brazil and Italy.

== Description ==
Average length is about 2.23 to 2.96 mm. There is a longitudinal sutural spot found on elytra. Prothorax is less transverse when compared to other closely related species. The transverse depression in front of pro thoracic base is indistinct. Lateral teeth are wide. In male, aedeagus with long gradually narrowed median lobe which get pointed at the apex. The rows of punctures on the elytra are narrow. The 9th abdominal sternite is strut Y-shaped, and elongate. Lateral sclerites elongate, membranous.

== Ecology ==
The adults are usually found in decaying plant substrates, haystacks, under dry cut grass, and leaf garbage. They can be attracted easily for light.
