= Planismus =

Planismus floridanus

Scientific classification
- Kingdom: Animalia
- Phylum: Arthropoda
- Class: Insecta
- Order: Coleoptera
- Suborder: Polyphaga
- Infraorder: Cucujiformia
- Family: Silvanidae
- Genus: Planismus; Casey, 1890
- Species: P. floridanus

Binomial name
- Planismus floridanus Casey, 1890

Species of beetle in the family Silvanidae

Planismus floridanus is a species of beetle in the family Silvanidae, the only species in the genus Planismus.
