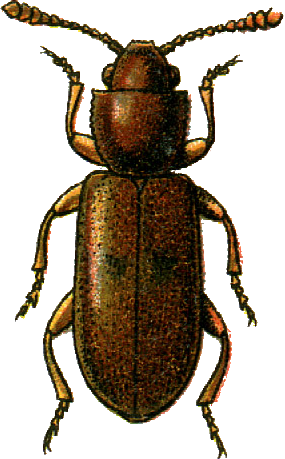

Scientific classification
- Kingdom: Animalia
- Phylum: Arthropoda
- Class: Insecta
- Order: Coleoptera
- Suborder: Polyphaga
- Infraorder: Cucujiformia
- Family: Silvanidae
- Genus: Monanus
- Species: M. concinnulus

Binomial name
- Monanus concinnulus (Walker, 1858)

Synonyms
- Cathartus fascipennis Reitter, 1876; Cryptamorpha fasciatus Wollaston, 1874; Monanus fasciatus (Wollaston, 1874); Monanus fascipennis (Reitter, 1876); Monanus signatus (Frauenfeld, 1867); Monotoma concinnulus Walker, 1858; Silvanus signatus Frauenfeld, 1867

= Monanus concinnulus =

Species of beetle

Monanus concinnulus is a species of silvanid flat bark beetle in the family Silvanidae. It is found in the Caribbean, Central America, North America, and Southern Asia.
