= Psammoecus simoni =

Scientific classification
- Kingdom: Animalia
- Phylum: Arthropoda
- Class: Insecta
- Order: Coleoptera
- Suborder: Polyphaga
- Infraorder: Cucujiformia
- Family: Silvanidae
- Genus: Psammoecus
- Species: P. simoni

Binomial name
- Psammoecus simoni Grouvelle, 1892

Synonyms
- Psammoecus simonis Grouvelle, 1892; Psammoecus stultus Grouvelle, 1912; Psammoecus simoni [sic]: Grouvelle 1908

Species of beetle

Psammoecus simoni, is a species of silvan flat bark beetle found in Taiwan, Japan, Philippines, India, Sri Lanka, Malaysia, Indonesia, Madagascar, France (Réunion), and Seychelles.
