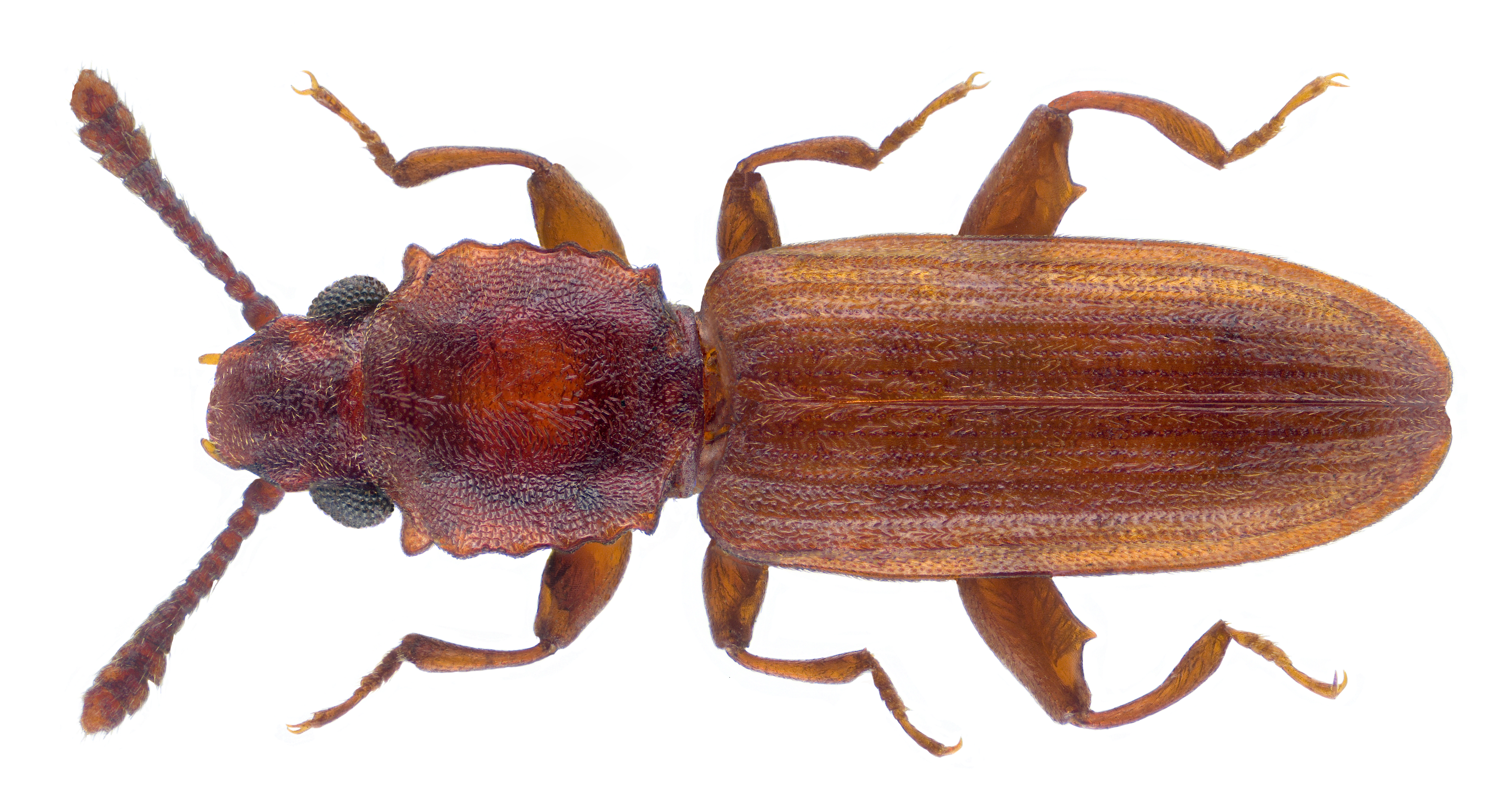
- Size: 4.2 mm (3.5 to 4.5 mm)

Scientific classification
- Kingdom: Animalia
- Phylum: Arthropoda
- Clade: Pancrustacea
- Class: Insecta
- Order: Coleoptera
- Suborder: Polyphaga
- Infraorder: Cucujiformia
- Family: Silvanidae
- Genus: Nausibius
- Species: N. clavicornis

Binomial name
- Nausibius clavicornis (Kugelann, 1794)

Synonyms
- Corticaria dentatus Marsham, 1802; Cucujus clavicornis Kugelann, 1794; Nausibius dentatus (Marsham, 1802); Nausibius denticulatus (Macleay, 1825); Nausibius intermedius (Smith, 1851); Nausibius latus (Fairmaire, 1850); Nausibius parallelus (Walker, 1858); Rhizophagus parallelus Walker, 1858; Silvanus intermedius Smith, 1851; Silvanus latus Fairmaire, 1850

= Nausibius clavicornis =

Species of beetle

Nausibius clavicornis is a species of silvanid flat bark beetle in the family Silvanidae. It is found in Africa, Australia, the Caribbean Sea, Europe and Northern Asia (excluding China), Central America, North America, Oceania, South America, and Southern Asia.
