= Silvanoprus cephalotes =

Scientific classification
- Kingdom: Animalia
- Phylum: Arthropoda
- Clade: Pancrustacea
- Class: Insecta
- Order: Coleoptera
- Suborder: Polyphaga
- Infraorder: Cucujiformia
- Family: Silvanidae
- Genus: Silvanoprus
- Species: S. cephalotes

Binomial name
- Silvanoprus cephalotes (Reitter, 1876)

Synonyms
- Silvanus cephalotes Reitter, 1876

Species of beetle

Silvanoprus cephalotes, is a species of silvan flat bark beetle found with a widespread distribution across Oriental and Papuan regions and also in the Palaearctic Far East.

== Distribution ==
It is found in India, Sri Lanka, Bangladesh, Nepal, Bhutan, China, Taiwan, Japan, Vietnam, Peninsular Malaysia, Indonesian islands such as Borneo, Sumatra, Java; and Papua New Guinea. The species has introduced to United Kingdom and the United States of America particularly with imported products of plant origin and also been found in Tanzania.

== Description ==
Average length is about 2.20 to 2.42 mm. Temple is very short. Lateral margin of prothorax is slightly rounded. Minute anterior spine of prothorax. The species can be separated by other sympatric species due to the presence of a small denticle on the front femur and the barrel-shaped pro-notum with very small anterior angles. The head is distinctly broader than the pronotum across anterior angles.

== Ecology ==
Adults are usually located in decomposing plant matter, where they feed on fungal substrates. In domestic environments, beetles can be found in haystacks, under bark, and also on stored products such as grains, copra, and flour. Adults are easily attracted by light.
