= Pseudochrodes =

Pseudochrodes suturalis

Scientific classification
- Kingdom: Animalia
- Phylum: Arthropoda
- Class: Insecta
- Order: Coleoptera
- Suborder: Polyphaga
- Infraorder: Cucujiformia
- Family: Silvanidae
- Genus: Pseudochrodes; Reitter, 1876
- Species: P. suturalis

Binomial name
- Pseudochrodes suturalis Reitter, 1876

Species of beetle

Pseudochrodes suturalis is a species of beetle in the family Silvanidae, the only species in the genus Pseudochrodes.
