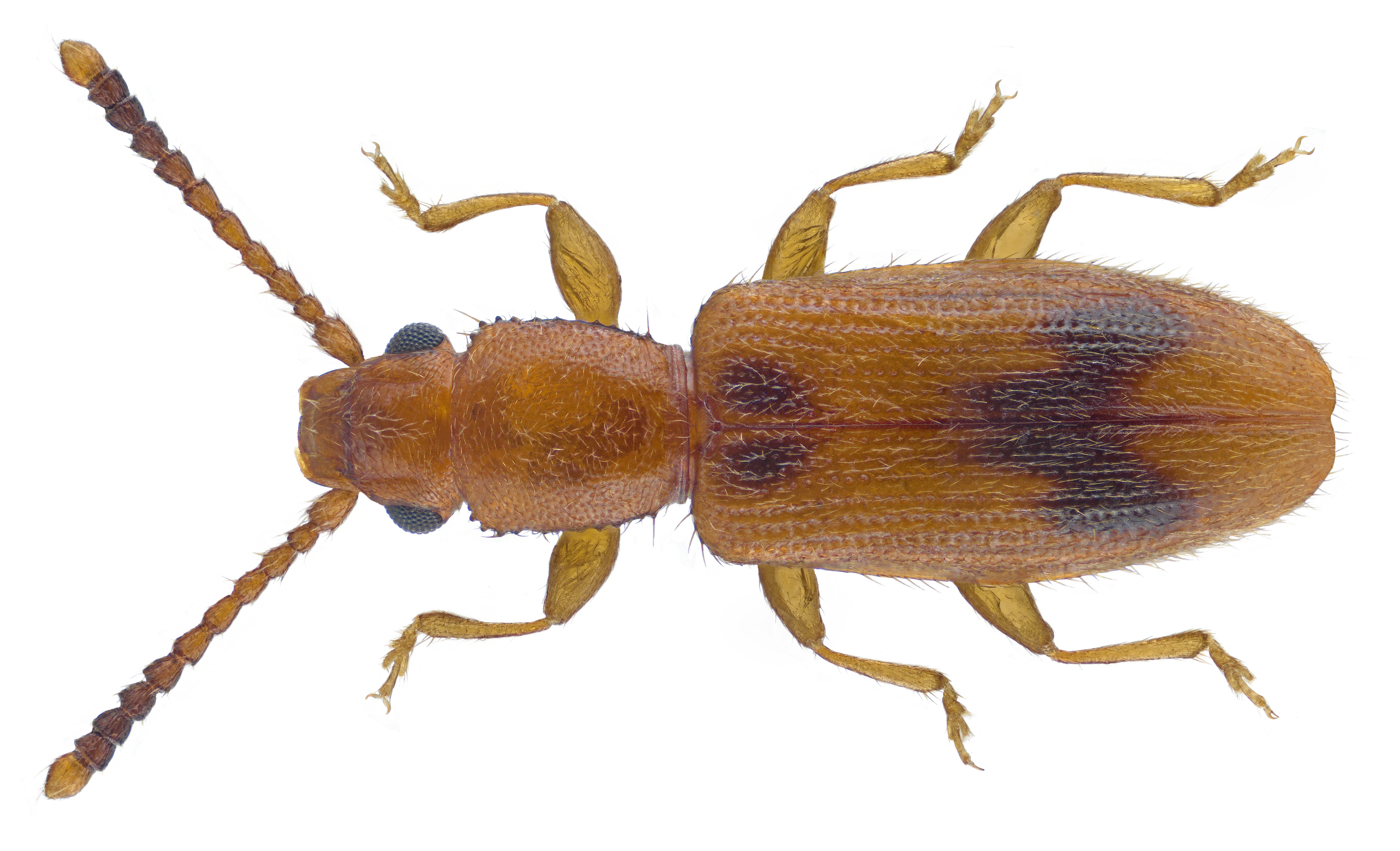

Scientific classification
- Kingdom: Animalia
- Phylum: Arthropoda
- Clade: Pancrustacea
- Class: Insecta
- Order: Coleoptera
- Suborder: Polyphaga
- Infraorder: Cucujiformia
- Family: Silvanidae
- Tribe: Telephanini
- Genus: Cryptamorpha
- Species: C. desjardinsii

Binomial name
- Cryptamorpha desjardinsii (Guérin-Méneville, 1844)

Synonyms
- Psammoecus desjardinsii Guérin-Méneville, 1844; Psammoechus desjardinsi (Casey, 1884); Telephanus fasciatus Redtenbacher, 1868 Cryptamorpha desjardinsi; (Guérin-Méneville, 1844) Psammoecus hubbardi; Casey, 1884 Cryptamorpha hubbardi; (Casey, 1884) Cryptamorpha musae; Wollaston, 1854 Pseudophanus signatus; LeConte, 1860 Cryptamorpha signatus; (LeConte, 1860) Dendrophagus suturalis; White, 1846

= Cryptamorpha desjardinsii =

Species of beetle

Cryptamorpha desjardinsii, known generally as the Desjardin's beetle or Desjardin's flat beetle, is a species of silvanid flat bark beetle in the family Silvanidae. It was first described by Félix Édouard Guérin-Méneville in 1844 and originally named Psammoechus desjardinsii. It is native to tropical Asia but is now found in many countries in Europe, North America, the Caribbean, and Oceania including in Australia and New Zealand.

== Description ==
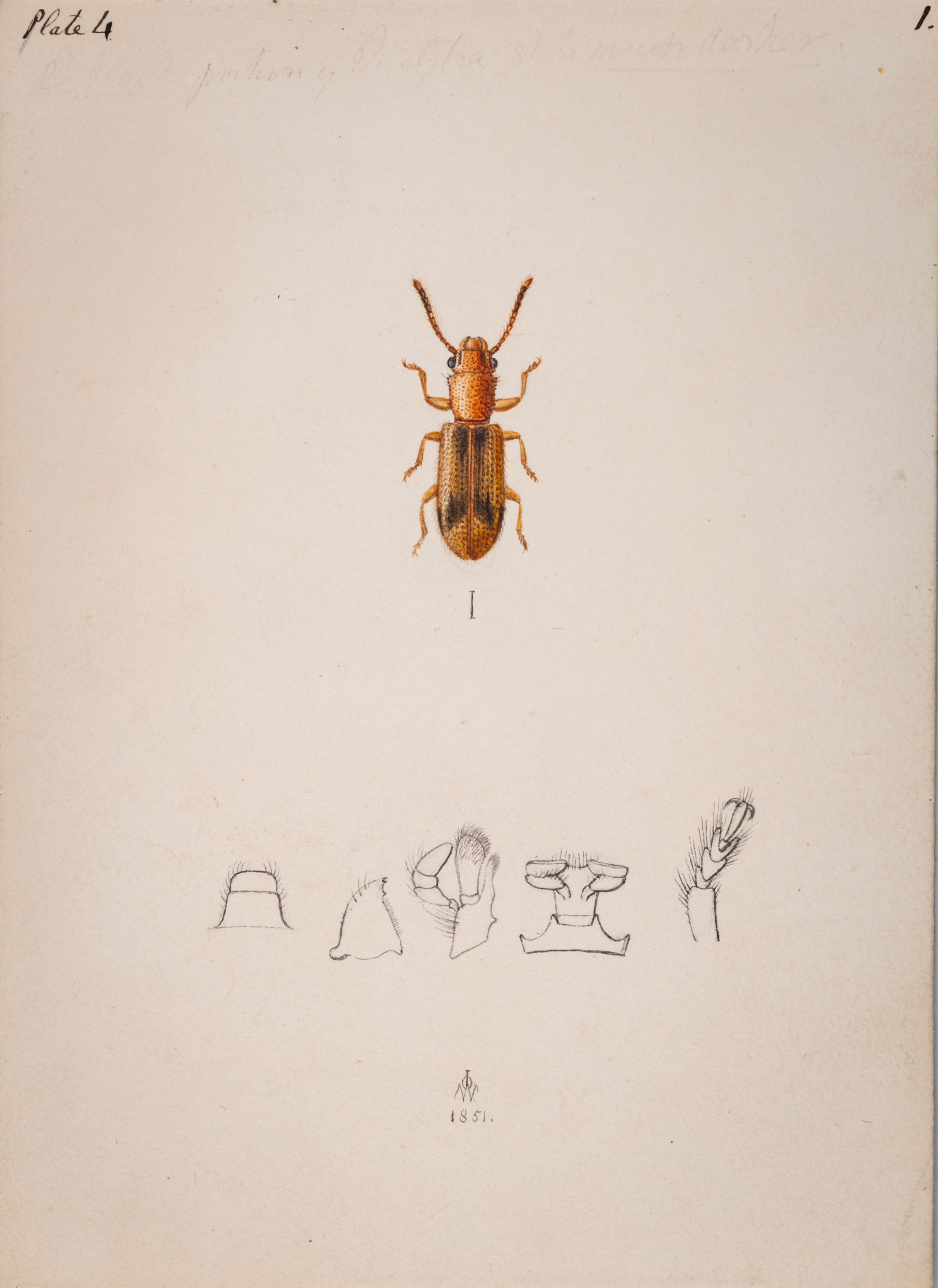
Cryptamorpha desjardinsii by John Obadiah Westwood

A small beetle with regular black markings on the elytra. It varies in size from 4 to 5mm.

== Range ==
Although native to tropical Asia the range of this species is now cosmopolitan. It can be found in many countries in Europe, North America, the Caribbean, and Oceania. It was introduced to New Zealand via Australia.

== Host species ==
This insect feeds on mildews and moulds found on plants. It has been commonly observed on flax.

== Etymology ==
It is likely that the beetle was named for Julien Desjardins, the French zoologist, as he was known to Guérin-Méneville. Guérin became the safekeeper of his documents after his untimely death.
