= Nausibius repandus =

Scientific classification
- Kingdom: Animalia
- Phylum: Arthropoda
- Class: Insecta
- Order: Coleoptera
- Suborder: Polyphaga
- Infraorder: Cucujiformia
- Family: Silvanidae
- Genus: Nausibius
- Species: N. repandus

Binomial name
- Nausibius repandus LeConte, 1866

Species of beetle

Nausibius repandus is a species of silvanid flat bark beetle in the family Silvanidae. It is found in North America.
