= Uleiota debilis =

Scientific classification
- Kingdom: Animalia
- Phylum: Arthropoda
- Class: Insecta
- Order: Coleoptera
- Suborder: Polyphaga
- Infraorder: Cucujiformia
- Family: Silvanidae
- Genus: Uleiota
- Species: U. debilis

Binomial name
- Uleiota debilis (LeConte, 1854)

Synonyms
- Brontes debilis LeConte, 1854

Species of beetle

Uleiota debilis is a species of silvanid flat bark beetle in the family Silvanidae. It is found in North America.

They are reddish-brown in color.
