= Silvanoprus scuticollis =

Scientific classification
- Kingdom: Animalia
- Phylum: Arthropoda
- Class: Insecta
- Order: Coleoptera
- Suborder: Polyphaga
- Infraorder: Cucujiformia
- Family: Silvanidae
- Genus: Silvanoprus
- Species: S. scuticollis

Binomial name
- Silvanoprus scuticollis (Walker, 1859)

Synonyms
- Silvanoprus triangulus (Reitter, 1876); Silvanus scuticollis Walker, 1859; Silvanus triangulus Reitter, 1876

Species of beetle

Silvanoprus scuticollis is a species of silvanid flat bark beetle in the family Silvanidae. It is found in Africa, the Caribbean, Central America, North America, South America, Southern Asia, and Europe.
