= Cathartosilvanus opaculus =

Scientific classification
- Domain: Eukaryota
- Kingdom: Animalia
- Phylum: Arthropoda
- Class: Insecta
- Order: Coleoptera
- Suborder: Polyphaga
- Infraorder: Cucujiformia
- Family: Silvanidae
- Genus: Cathartosilvanus
- Species: C. opaculus

Binomial name
- Cathartosilvanus opaculus (LeConte, 1854)

Synonyms
- Cathartosilvanus trivialis (Grouvelle, 1878); Silvanus opaculus LeConte, 1854; Silvanus trivialis Grouvelle, 1878

Species of beetle

Cathartosilvanus opaculus is a species of silvanid flat bark beetle in the family Silvanidae. It is found in the Caribbean Sea, Central America, North America, and South America.
