= Platamus =

Scientific classification
- Kingdom: Animalia
- Phylum: Arthropoda
- Class: Insecta
- Order: Coleoptera
- Suborder: Polyphaga
- Infraorder: Cucujiformia
- Family: Silvanidae
- Genus: Platamus; Erichson, 1845

Genus of beetles

Platamus is a genus of beetles in the family Silvanidae, containing the following species:

- Platamus buqueti Grouvelle
- Platamus castaneus Grouvelle
- Platamus debilis Grouvelle
- Platamus deyrollei Grouvelle
- Platamus dufaui Grouvelle
- Platamus humeralis Reitter
- Platamus longicornis Sharp
- Platamus richteri Reitter
- Platamus schaumi Grouvelle
- Platamus sharpi Hetschko
