= Telephanus lecontei =

Scientific classification
- Kingdom: Animalia
- Phylum: Arthropoda
- Class: Insecta
- Order: Coleoptera
- Suborder: Polyphaga
- Infraorder: Cucujiformia
- Family: Silvanidae
- Tribe: Telephanini
- Genus: Telephanus
- Species: T. lecontei

Binomial name
- Telephanus lecontei Casey, 1884

Species of beetle

Telephanus lecontei is a species of silvanid flat bark beetle in the family Silvanidae. It is found in North America.
