= Saunibius =

Saunibius moyseyi

Scientific classification
- Kingdom: Animalia
- Phylum: Arthropoda
- Class: Insecta
- Order: Coleoptera
- Suborder: Polyphaga
- Infraorder: Cucujiformia
- Family: Silvanidae
- Genus: Saunibius; Halstead, 1997
- Species: S. moyseyi

Binomial name
- Saunibius moyseyi Halstead, 1997

Species of beetle

Saunibius moyseyi is a species of beetles in the family Silvanidae, the only species in the genus Saunibius.
