= Indophanus =

Indophanus dakshinus

Scientific classification
- Kingdom: Animalia
- Phylum: Arthropoda
- Class: Insecta
- Order: Coleoptera
- Suborder: Polyphaga
- Infraorder: Cucujiformia
- Family: Silvanidae
- Genus: Indophanus; Pal, 1982
- Species: I. dakshinus

Binomial name
- Indophanus dakshinus Pal, 1982

Species of beetle

Indophanus dakshinus is a species of beetle in the family Silvanidae, the only species in the genus Indophanus.
