= Protosilvanus =

Scientific classification
- Kingdom: Animalia
- Phylum: Arthropoda
- Class: Insecta
- Order: Coleoptera
- Suborder: Polyphaga
- Infraorder: Cucujiformia
- Family: Silvanidae
- Genus: Protosilvanus; Grouvelle, 1912

Genus of beetles

Protosilvanus is a genus of beetles in the family Silvanidae, containing the following species:

- Protosilvanus carinatus Grouvelle
- Protosilvanus dehradunicus Pal & Sen Gupta
- Protosilvanus fasciatus Halstead
- Protosilvanus granosus Grouvelle
- Protosilvanus inaequalis Grouvelle
- Protosilvanus lateritius Reitter
