= Afronausibius =

Scientific classification
- Kingdom: Animalia
- Phylum: Arthropoda
- Class: Insecta
- Order: Coleoptera
- Suborder: Polyphaga
- Infraorder: Cucujiformia
- Family: Silvanidae
- Genus: Afronausibius; Halstead, 1980

Genus of beetles

Afronausibius is a genus of beetles in the family Silvanidae, containing the following species:

- Afronausibius abnormis Grouvelle
- Afronausibius pumilus Halstead, 1980
