= Pseudosilvanus =

Pseudosilvanus distinctus

Scientific classification
- Kingdom: Animalia
- Phylum: Arthropoda
- Class: Insecta
- Order: Coleoptera
- Suborder: Polyphaga
- Infraorder: Cucujiformia
- Family: Silvanidae
- Genus: Pseudosilvanus; Grouvelle, 1912
- Species: P. distinctus

Binomial name
- Pseudosilvanus distinctus Grouvelle, 1912

Species of beetle

Pseudosilvanus distinctus is a species of beetle in the family Silvanidae, the only species in the genus Pseudosilvanus.
