= Acorimus =

Acorimus problematicus

Scientific classification
- Kingdom: Animalia
- Phylum: Arthropoda
- Class: Insecta
- Order: Coleoptera
- Suborder: Polyphaga
- Infraorder: Cucujiformia
- Family: Silvanidae
- Genus: Acorimus; Halstead, 1980
- Species: A. problematicus

Binomial name
- Acorimus problematicus Halstead, 1980

Species of beetle

Acorimus problematicus is a species of beetle in the family Silvanidae, the only species in the genus Acorimus.
