= Silvanoides =

Scientific classification
- Kingdom: Animalia
- Phylum: Arthropoda
- Class: Insecta
- Order: Coleoptera
- Suborder: Polyphaga
- Infraorder: Cucujiformia
- Family: Silvanidae
- Genus: Silvanoides; Halstead, 1973

Genus of beetles

Silvanoides is a genus of beetles in the family Silvanidae, containing the following species:

- Silvanoides cheesmanae Halstead
- Silvanoides cribricollis Grouvelle
- Silvanoides foveicollis Halstead
