= Parasilvanus =

Scientific classification
- Kingdom: Animalia
- Phylum: Arthropoda
- Class: Insecta
- Order: Coleoptera
- Suborder: Polyphaga
- Infraorder: Cucujiformia
- Family: Silvanidae
- Genus: Parasilvanus; Grouvelle, 1912

Genus of beetles

Parasilvanus is a genus of beetles in the family Silvanidae, containing the following species:

- Parasilvanus fairmairei Grouvelle
- Parasilvanus mimosae Halstead
- Parasilvanus oblitus Grouvelle
- Parasilvanus ocellatus Grouvelle
- Parasilvanus pulcher Grouvelle
- Parasilvanus tenuis Grouvelle
