= Astilpnus =

Scientific classification
- Kingdom: Animalia
- Phylum: Arthropoda
- Class: Insecta
- Order: Coleoptera
- Suborder: Polyphaga
- Infraorder: Cucujiformia
- Family: Silvanidae
- Genus: Astilpnus; Perris, 1866

Genus of beetles

Astilpnus is a genus of beetles in the family Silvanidae, containing the following species:

- Astilpnus multistriolatus Perris, 1866
- Astilpnus reflexicollis (Motschulsky, 1868)
