= Austronausibius =

Scientific classification
- Kingdom: Animalia
- Phylum: Arthropoda
- Class: Insecta
- Order: Coleoptera
- Suborder: Polyphaga
- Infraorder: Cucujiformia
- Family: Silvanidae
- Genus: Austronausibius; Halstead, 1980

Genus of beetles

Austronausibius is a genus of beetles in the family Silvanidae, containing the following species:

- Austronausibius aemulus Halstead, 1980
- Austronausibius aridulus Blackburn
- Austronausibius congener Olliff
- Austronausibius edentatus Halstead
- Austronausibius leai Halstead
- Austronausibius neglectus Halstead
