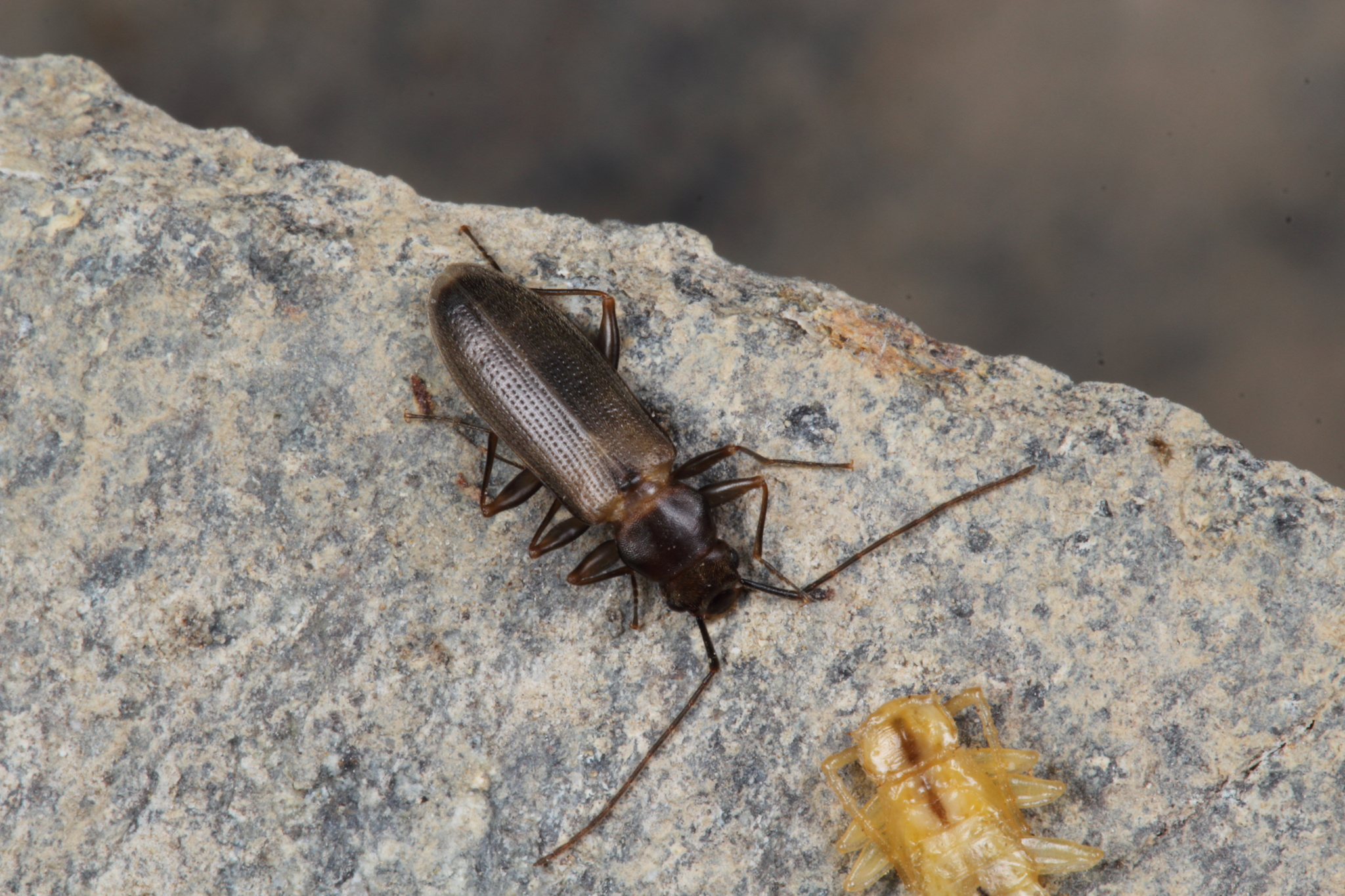
- Protodendrophagus antipodes, New Zealand

Scientific classification
- Kingdom: Animalia
- Phylum: Arthropoda
- Class: Insecta
- Order: Coleoptera
- Suborder: Polyphaga
- Infraorder: Cucujiformia
- Superfamily: Cucujoidea
- Family: Silvanidae
- Genus: Protodendrophagus; Thomas, 2004
- Species: P. antipodes

Binomial name
- Protodendrophagus antipodes Thomas, 2004

= Protodendrophagus =

Genus of beetles

Protodendrophagus is a genus of beetles in the family Silvanidae. The single described species, Protodendrophagus antipodes, is known only from several localities high in the mountains of South Island, New Zealand, where it has been found under rocks.

Protodendrophagus can be distinguished from other genera in the subfamily Brontinae, tribe Brontini, by its possession of a frontoclypeal suture, absence of hindwings, elytra not fused, and lack of body incrustation.
