= Aplatamus =

Scientific classification
- Kingdom: Animalia
- Phylum: Arthropoda
- Class: Insecta
- Order: Coleoptera
- Suborder: Polyphaga
- Infraorder: Cucujiformia
- Family: Silvanidae
- Genus: Aplatamus; Grouvelle, 1912

Genus of beetles

Aplatamus is a genus of beetles in the family Silvanidae, containing the following species:

- Aplatamus difficilis Sharp
- Aplatamus dispar Sharp
- Aplatamus grouvellei Sharp
- Aplatamus mexicanus Grouvelle
- Aplatamus uniformis Sharp
