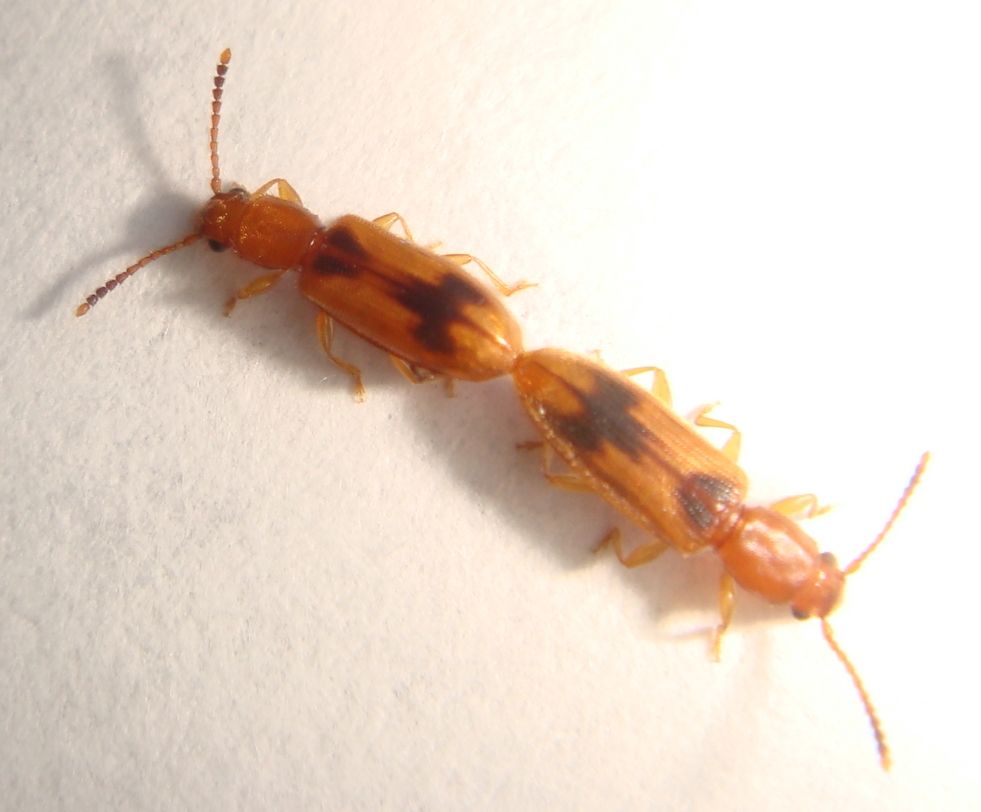
- Cryptamorpha desjardinsi mating

Scientific classification
- Kingdom: Animalia
- Phylum: Arthropoda
- Class: Insecta
- Order: Coleoptera
- Suborder: Polyphaga
- Infraorder: Cucujiformia
- Family: Silvanidae
- Tribe: Telephanini
- Genus: Cryptamorpha; Wollaston, 1854

= Cryptamorpha =

Genus of beetles

Cryptamorpha is a widespread genus of beetles in the family Silvanidae, which has not been comprehensively revised taxonomically. The best known species is Cryptamorpha desjardinsii. The most recently described species is Cryptamorpha triregia, from the Three Kings Islands, New Zealand.
