= Synobius =

Scientific classification
- Kingdom: Animalia
- Phylum: Arthropoda
- Class: Insecta
- Order: Coleoptera
- Suborder: Polyphaga
- Infraorder: Cucujiformia
- Family: Silvanidae
- Genus: Synobius; Sharp, 1899

Genus of beetles

Synobius is a genus of beetles in the family Silvanidae, containing the following species:

- Synobius lobatus Grouvelle
- Synobius lobicollis Sharp
