= Silvanopsis =

Scientific classification
- Kingdom: Animalia
- Phylum: Arthropoda
- Class: Insecta
- Order: Coleoptera
- Suborder: Polyphaga
- Infraorder: Cucujiformia
- Family: Silvanidae
- Genus: Silvanopsis; Grouvelle, 1892

Genus of beetles

Silvanopsis is a genus of beetles in the family Silvanidae, containing the following species:

- Silvanopsis nepalensis Pal & Sen Gupta
- Silvanopsis raffrayi Grouvelle
- Silvanopsis simoni Grouvelle
