= Cathartosilvanus =

Scientific classification
- Kingdom: Animalia
- Phylum: Arthropoda
- Class: Insecta
- Order: Coleoptera
- Suborder: Polyphaga
- Infraorder: Cucujiformia
- Family: Silvanidae
- Subfamily: Silvaninae
- Genus: Cathartosilvanus; Grouvelle, 1913

Genus of beetles

Cathartosilvanus is a genus of beetles in the family Silvanidae, containing the following species:

- Cathartosilvanus aitkenae Halstead
- Cathartosilvanus imbellis LeConte
- Cathartosilvanus opaculus LeConte
- Cathartosilvanus tropicalis Van Dyke
- Cathartosilvanus vulgaris Grouvelle
