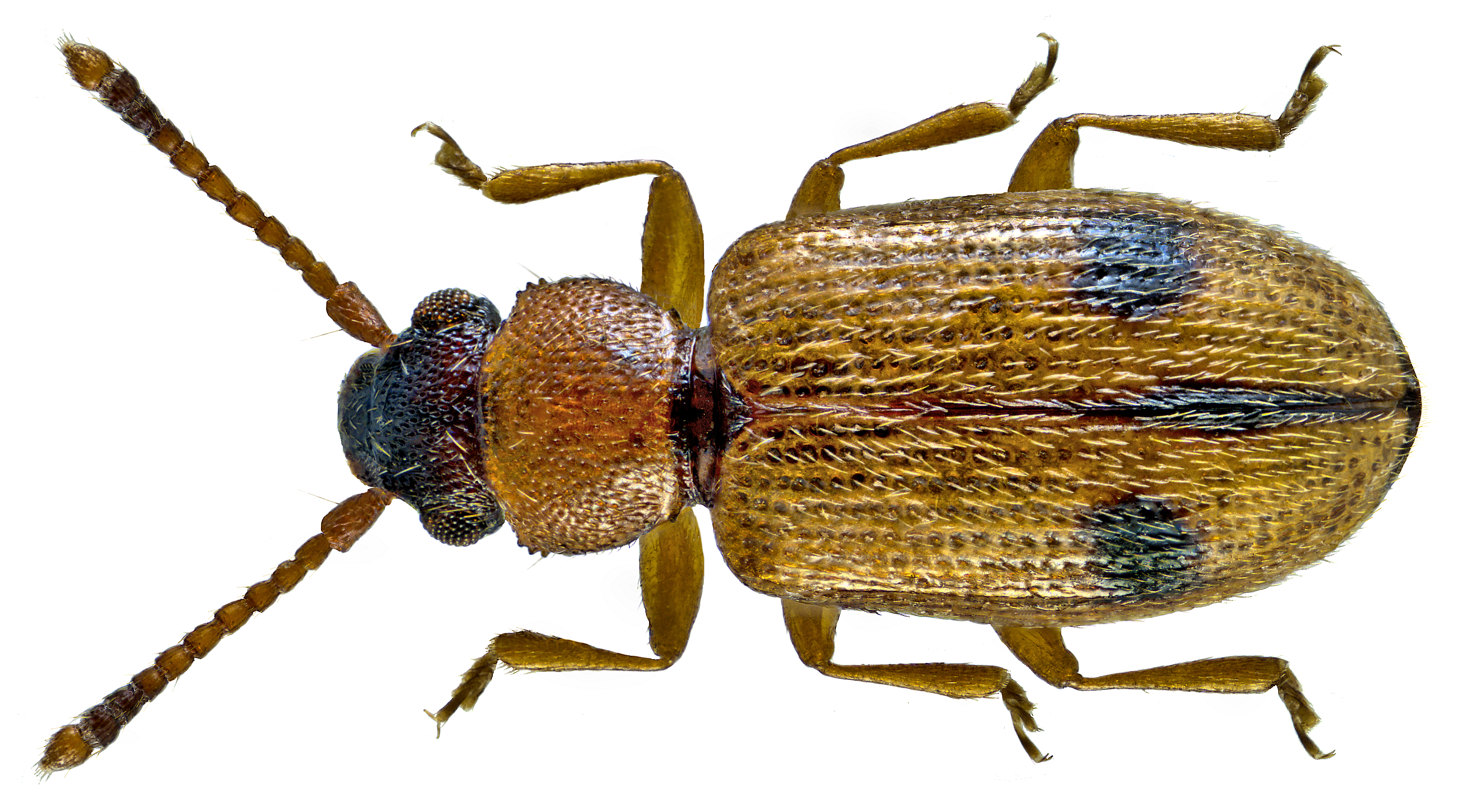
- Psammoecus bipunctatus

Scientific classification
- Kingdom: Animalia
- Phylum: Arthropoda
- Clade: Pancrustacea
- Class: Insecta
- Order: Coleoptera
- Suborder: Polyphaga
- Infraorder: Cucujiformia
- Family: Silvanidae
- Genus: Psammoecus; Latreille in Cuvier, 1829

= Psammoecus =

Genus of beetles

Psammoecus is a genus of beetles in the family Silvanidae, containing the following species:

- Psammoecus alluaudi Grouvelle
- Psammoecus amoenus Grouvelle
- Psammoecus andrewesi Grouvelle
- Psammoecus angulatus Grouvelle
- Psammoecus antennatus Waterhouse
- Psammoecus bambusae Pal
- Psammoecus bhutanicus
- Psammoecus biangulatus Grouvelle
- Psammoecus biapicallis Arrow
- Psammoecus bipunctatus Fabricius
- Psammoecus blandus Grouvelle
- Psammoecus breviusculus Reitter
- Psammoecus brunnescens Grouvelle
- Psammoecus complexus Pal
- Psammoecus concolor Grouvelle
- Psammoecus convexus Grouvelle
- Psammoecus crassus Grouvelle
- Psammoecus decoratus Grouvelle
- Psammoecus delicatus Grouvelle
- Psammoecus dentatus Grouvelle
- Psammoecus elegans Grouvelle
- Psammoecus excellens Grouvelle
- Psammoecus eximius Grouvelle
- Psammoecus fairmairei Grouvelle
- Psammoecus fasciatus Reitter
- Psammoecus felix Waterhouse
- Psammoecus gentilis Grouvelle
- Psammoecus grandis Grouvelle
- Psammoecus gratiosus Grouvelle
- Psammoecus hacquardi Grouvelle
- Psammoecus harmandi Grouvelle
- Psammoecus hirsutus Olliff
- Psammoecus impressicollis Grouvelle
- Psammoecus incertior Blackburn
- Psammoecus incommodus Walker
- Psammoecus inflatus Grouvelle
- Psammoecus insularis Sharp
- Psammoecus khasia Pal
- Psammoecus laetulus Grouvelle
- Psammoecus lancifer Grouvelle
- Psammoecus lateralis Grouvelle
- Psammoecus lepidus Grouvelle
- Psammoecus lineatus Grouvelle
- Psammoecus longicornis Schauffuss
- Psammoecus major Grouvelle
- Psammoecus marginatus Grouvelle
- Psammoecus marginicollis Grouvelle
- Psammoecus nitescens Grouvelle
- Psammoecus nitidior Grouvelle
- Psammoecus nitidus Grouvelle
- Psammoecus obesus Grouvelle
- Psammoecus oblitus Grouvelle
- Psammoecus obscurus Arrow
- Psammoecus ornatus Grouvelle
- Psammoecus pallidipennis Blackburn
- Psammoecus parallelus Grouvelle
- Psammoecus pascoei Grouvelle
- Psammoecus personatus Grouvelle
- Psammoecus piceus Grouvelle
- Psammoecus pictus Waterhouse
- Psammoecus pradieri Grouvelle
- Psammoecus quadrimaculatus Reitter
- Psammoecus quadrinotatus Grouvelle
- Psammoecus raffrayi Grouvelle
- Psammoecus reitteri Grouvelle
- Psammoecus rotundicollis Grouvelle
- Psammoecus serrulatus Montrouzier
- Psammoecus signatus Grouvelle
- Psammoecus simoni Grouvelle
- Psammoecus spinicollis Waterhouse
- Psammoecus spinosus Grouvelle
- Psammoecus stultus Grouvelle
- Psammoecus tereticollis Grouvelle
- Psammoecus tnotatus Blackburn
- Psammoecus triguttatus Reitter
- Psammoecus trilochana Pal
- Psammoecus trimaculatus Motschulsky
- Psammoecus vittifer Blackburn
- Psammoecus wittmeri Pal & Sen Gupta
- Psammoecus xnotatus Grouvelle
