= Afrocorimus =

Afrocorimus endroedyi

Scientific classification
- Kingdom: Animalia
- Phylum: Arthropoda
- Class: Insecta
- Order: Coleoptera
- Suborder: Polyphaga
- Infraorder: Cucujiformia
- Family: Silvanidae
- Genus: Afrocorimus; Halstead, 1980
- Species: A. endroedyi

Binomial name
- Afrocorimus endroedyi Halstead, 1980

Species of beetle

Afrocorimus endroedyi is a species of beetles in the family Silvanidae, the only species in the genus Afrocorimus.
