= Uleiota =

- Uleiota planata

Scientific classification
- Kingdom: Animalia
- Phylum: Arthropoda
- Clade: Pancrustacea
- Class: Insecta
- Order: Coleoptera
- Suborder: Polyphaga
- Infraorder: Cucujiformia
- Family: Silvanidae
- Tribe: Brontini
- Genus: Uleiota; Latreille, 1796

Genus of beetles

Uleiota is a genus of beetles in the family Silvanidae, containing the following species:

- Uleiota africana Grouvelle
- Uleiota alticola Pal
- Uleiota arborea Reitter
- Uleiota atrata Grouvelle
- Uleiota australis Erichson
- Uleiota bicolor Arrow
- Uleiota brevicollis Arrow
- Uleiota capito Pascoe
- Uleiota chilensis Blanchard
- Uleiota cinnamomea Fairmaire
- Uleiota costicollis Reitter
- Uleiota crenicollis Grouvelle
- Uleiota debilis LeConte
- Uleiota dubia Fabricius
- Uleiota fallax Grouvelle
- Uleiota feae Grouvelle
- Uleiota gracilicornis Arrow
- Uleiota indica Arrow
- Uleiota integricollis Fairmaire
- Uleiota macleayi Olliff
- Uleiota militaris Erichson
- Uleiota pallida Arrow
- Uleiota planata Linnaeus
- Uleiota puberula Reitter
- Uleiota quadraticollis Fairmaire
- Uleiota serrata Smith
- Uleiota serricollis Candeze
- Uleiota siamensis Arrow
- Uleiota spinicollis Gory
- Uleiota texana Dajoz
- Uleiota truncata Motschulsky
- Uleiota truncatipennis Heller
