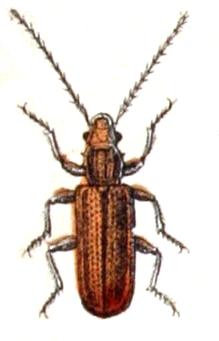
- Dendrophagus crenatus

Scientific classification
- Kingdom: Animalia
- Phylum: Arthropoda
- Class: Insecta
- Order: Coleoptera
- Suborder: Polyphaga
- Infraorder: Cucujiformia
- Family: Silvanidae
- Genus: Dendrophagus; Schoenherr, 1809

= Dendrophagus =

Genus of beetles

Dendrophagus is a genus of beetles in the family Silvanidae, containing the following species:

- Dendrophagus capito Reitter
- Dendrophagus crenatus Paykull, 1799
- Dendrophagus cygnaei Mannerheim
- Dendrophagus longicornis Reitter
