= Nepharinus =

Nepharinus goudiei

Scientific classification
- Kingdom: Animalia
- Phylum: Arthropoda
- Class: Insecta
- Order: Coleoptera
- Suborder: Polyphaga
- Infraorder: Cucujiformia
- Family: Silvanidae
- Genus: Nepharinus; Grouvelle, 1912
- Species: N. goudiei

Binomial name
- Nepharinus goudiei (Lea, 1904)

Species of beetle

Nepharinus goudiei is a species of beetle in the family Silvanidae, the only species in the genus Nepharinus.
