= Silvanosoma =

Silvanosoma striatum

Scientific classification
- Kingdom: Animalia
- Phylum: Arthropoda
- Class: Insecta
- Order: Coleoptera
- Suborder: Polyphaga
- Infraorder: Cucujiformia
- Family: Silvanidae
- Genus: Silvanosoma; Brèthes, 1922
- Species: S. striatum

Binomial name
- Silvanosoma striatum Brèthes, 1922

Species of beetle

Silvanosoma striatum is a species of beetles in the family Silvanidae, the only species in the genus Silvanosoma.

== Taxonomic Classification ==
- Kingdom: Animalia
- Phylum: Arthropoda
- Class: Insecta
- Order: Coleoptera
- Family: Silvanidae
- Genus: Silvanosoma
- Species: S. striatum
