= Synoemis =

Synoemis pandani

Scientific classification
- Kingdom: Animalia
- Phylum: Arthropoda
- Class: Insecta
- Order: Coleoptera
- Suborder: Polyphaga
- Infraorder: Cucujiformia
- Family: Silvanidae
- Genus: Synoemis; Pascoe, 1863
- Species: S. pandani

Binomial name
- Synoemis pandani Pascoe, 1863

Species of beetle

Synoemis pandani is a species of beetle in the family Silvanidae, the only species in the genus Synoemis.
