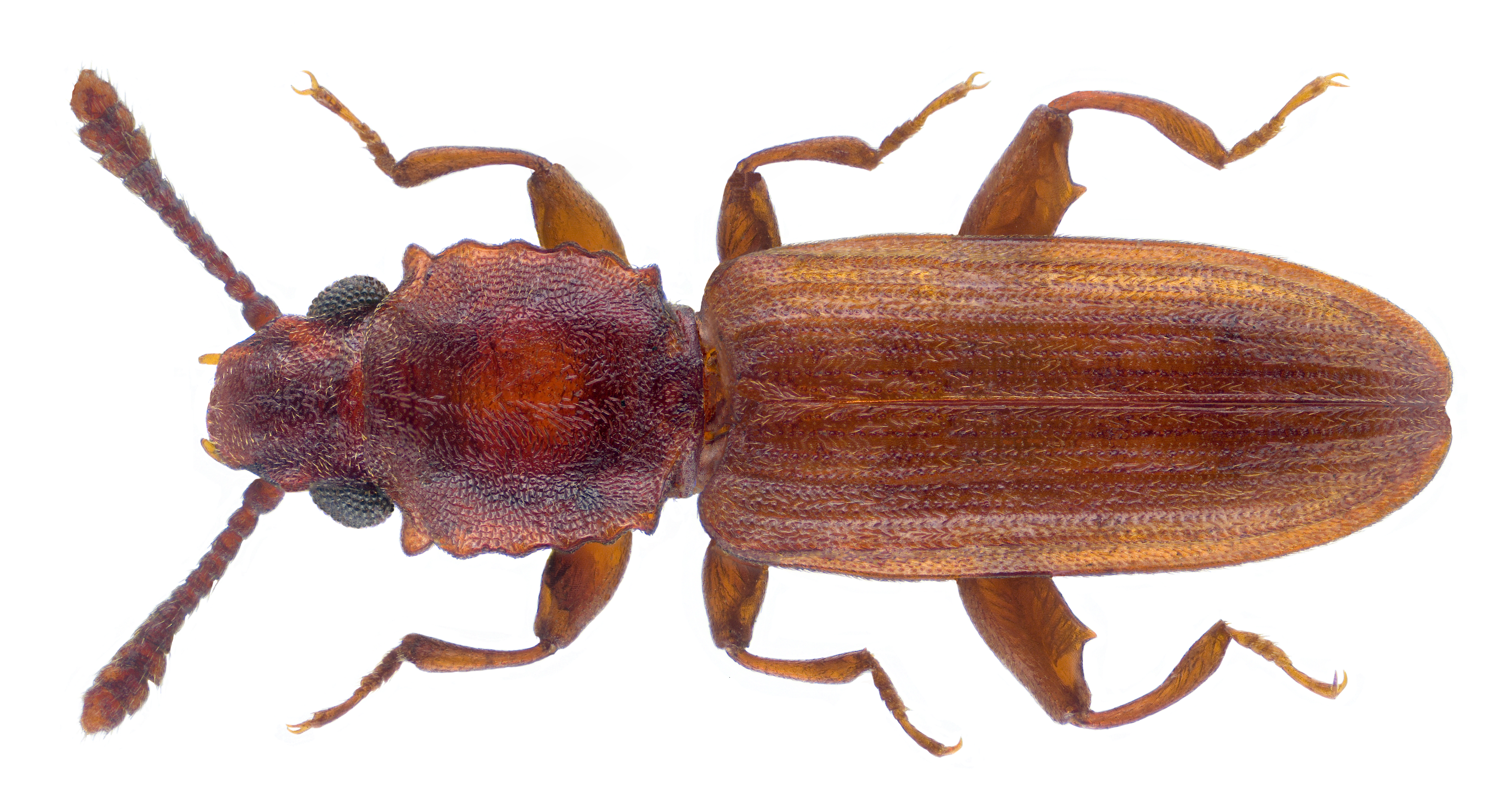
- Nausibius clavicornis

Scientific classification
- Kingdom: Animalia
- Phylum: Arthropoda
- Class: Insecta
- Order: Coleoptera
- Suborder: Polyphaga
- Infraorder: Cucujiformia
- Family: Silvanidae
- Subfamily: Silvaninae
- Genus: Nausibius; Redtenbacher, 1858

= Nausibius =

Genus of beetles

Nausibius is a genus of beetles in the family Silvanidae, containing the following species:

- Nausibius brevicornis Sharp
- Nausibius clavicornis Kugelann
- Nausibius gigas Grouvelle
- Nausibius grouvellei Sharp
- Nausibius inermis Grouvelle
- Nausibius ingens Grouvelle
- Nausibius major Zimmerman
- Nausibius repandus LeConte
- Nausibius sahlbergi Grouvelle
- Nausibius silvanoides Sharp
- Nausibius sinuatus Grouvelle
- Nausibius wagneri Grouvelle
- †Nausibius radchenkoi Alekseev et al., 2023
