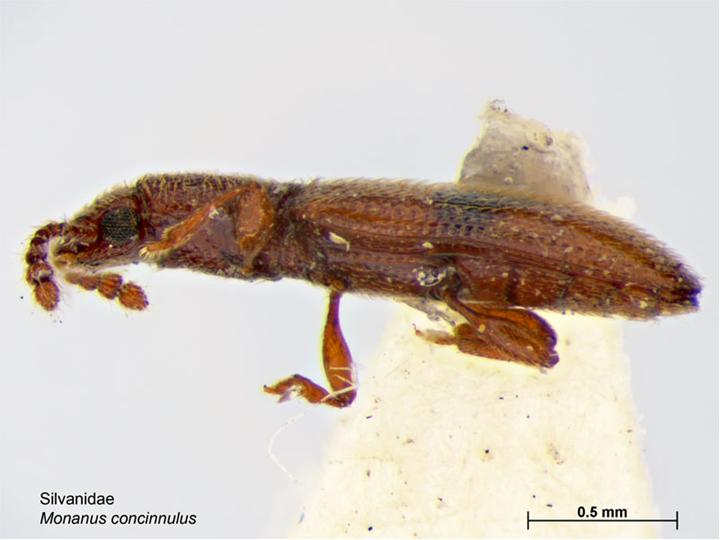
- Monanus concinnulus

Scientific classification
- Kingdom: Animalia
- Phylum: Arthropoda
- Class: Insecta
- Order: Coleoptera
- Suborder: Polyphaga
- Infraorder: Cucujiformia
- Family: Silvanidae
- Subfamily: Silvaninae
- Genus: Monanus; Sharp, 1879

= Monanus =

Genus of beetles

Monanus is a genus of beetles in the family Silvanidae, containing the following species:

- Monanus albertisi Grouvelle
- Monanus antennatus Grouvelle
- Monanus bisinuatus Grouvelle
- Monanus bouchardi Grouvelle
- Monanus cairnensis Blackburn
- Monanus concinnulus Walker
- Monanus denticulatus Grouvelle
- Monanus discoidalis Grouvelle
- Monanus insolitus Grouvelle
- Monanus longicornis Grouvelle
- Monanus longipennis Grouvelle
- Monanus malaicus Grouvelle
- Monanus monticola Blackburn
- Monanus ornatus Grouvelle
- Monanus punctatus Grouvelle
- Monanus raffrayi Grouvelle
- Monanus rambicus Pal
- Monanus rugosus Grouvelle
- Monanus telephanoides Grouvelle
- Monanus temporalis Grouvelle
- Monanus villosus Grouvelle
