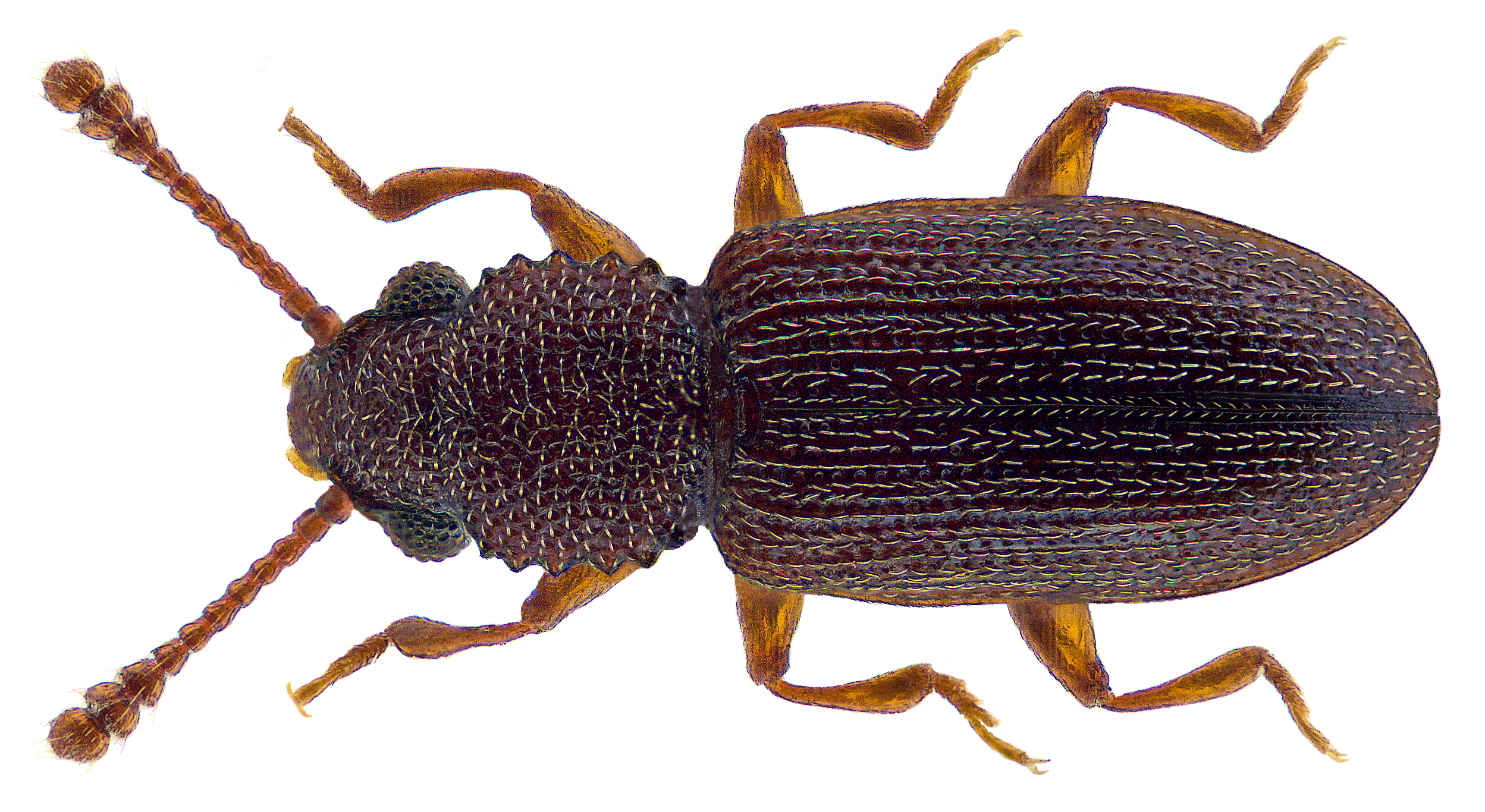
- Silvanolomus denticollis

Scientific classification
- Kingdom: Animalia
- Phylum: Arthropoda
- Class: Insecta
- Order: Coleoptera
- Suborder: Polyphaga
- Infraorder: Cucujiformia
- Family: Silvanidae
- Genus: Silvanolomus; Reitter, 1912

= Silvanolomus =

Genus of beetles

Silvanolomus is a genus of beetles in the family Silvanidae, containing the following species:

- Silvanolomus armatulus Blackburn
- Silvanolomus crenicollis Grouvelle
- Silvanolomus denticollis Reitter
- Silvanolomus goughi Halstead
- Silvanolomus inermis Reitter
- Silvanolomus pullus Reitter
