= Silvanops =

Scientific classification
- Kingdom: Animalia
- Phylum: Arthropoda
- Class: Insecta
- Order: Coleoptera
- Suborder: Polyphaga
- Infraorder: Cucujiformia
- Family: Silvanidae
- Genus: Silvanops; Grouvelle, 1912

Genus of beetles

Silvanops is a genus of beetles in the family Silvanidae, containing the following species:

- Silvanops angulicollis Reitter
- Silvanops columbinus Grouvelle
- Silvanops perforatus Sharp
