= Nepharis =

Scientific classification
- Kingdom: Animalia
- Phylum: Arthropoda
- Class: Insecta
- Order: Coleoptera
- Suborder: Polyphaga
- Infraorder: Cucujiformia
- Family: Silvanidae
- Genus: Nepharis; Laporte de Castelnau, 1869

Genus of beetles

Nepharis is a genus of beetles in the family Silvanidae, containing the following species:

- Nepharis alata Laporte de Castelnau, 1869
- Nepharis costata King, 1869
- Nepharis doddi Lea
- Nepharis serraticollis Lea, 1910
