= Coccidotrophus =

Scientific classification
- Kingdom: Animalia
- Phylum: Arthropoda
- Class: Insecta
- Order: Coleoptera
- Suborder: Polyphaga
- Infraorder: Cucujiformia
- Family: Silvanidae
- Genus: Coccidotrophus; Schwarz & Barber, 1921

Genus of beetles

Coccidotrophus is a genus of beetles in the family Silvanidae, containing the following species:

- Coccidotrophus cordiae Barber
- Coccidotrophus socialis Schwarz & Barber, 1921
