= Metacorimus =

Metacorimus mroczkowskii

Scientific classification
- Kingdom: Animalia
- Phylum: Arthropoda
- Class: Insecta
- Order: Coleoptera
- Suborder: Polyphaga
- Infraorder: Cucujiformia
- Family: Silvanidae
- Genus: Metacorimus; Halstead, 1997
- Species: M. mroczkowskii

Binomial name
- Metacorimus mroczkowskii Halstead, 1997

Species of beetle

Metacorimus mroczkowskii is a species of beetles in the family Silvanidae, the only species in the genus Metacorimus.
