= Megapsammoecus =

Scientific classification
- Kingdom: Animalia
- Phylum: Arthropoda
- Class: Insecta
- Order: Coleoptera
- Suborder: Polyphaga
- Infraorder: Cucujiformia
- Family: Silvanidae
- Genus: Megapsammoecus; Karner, 1995

Genus of beetles

Megapsammoecus is a genus of beetles in the family Silvanidae, containing the following species:

- Megapsammoecus christinae Karner, 1995
- Megapsammoecus inexpectatus Karner, 1995
