= Psammaechidius =

Scientific classification
- Kingdom: Animalia
- Phylum: Arthropoda
- Class: Insecta
- Order: Coleoptera
- Suborder: Polyphaga
- Infraorder: Cucujiformia
- Family: Silvanidae
- Subfamily: Brontinae
- Tribe: Telephanini
- Genus: Psammaechidius; Fairmaire, 1882
- Species: P. spinicollis

Binomial name
- Psammaechidius spinicollis (Fairmaire, 1862)

Genus of beetles

Psammaechidius is a genus of silvanid flat bark beetles in the family Silvanidae. There is one described species in Psammaechidius, P. spinicollis.
