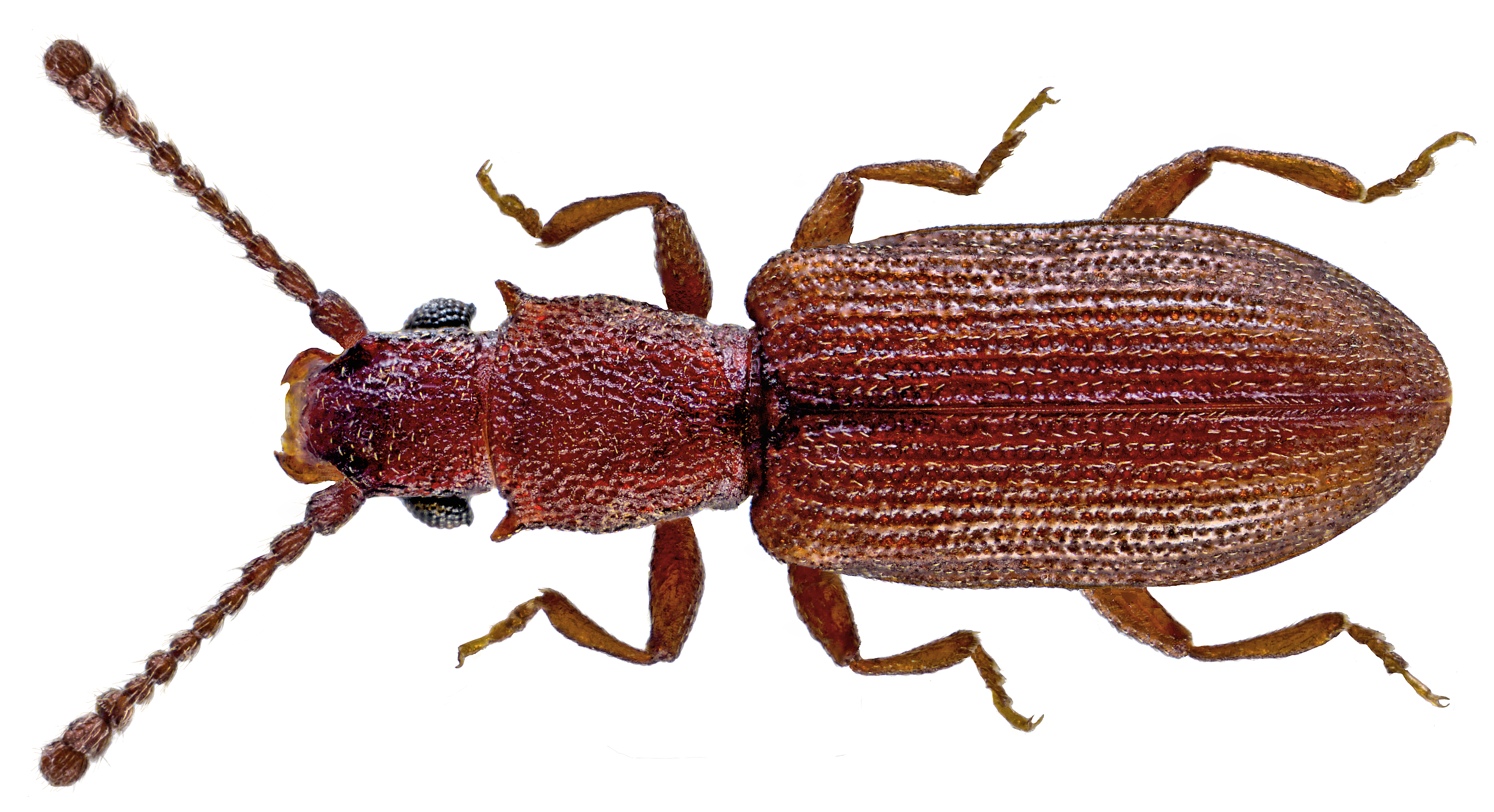
- Silvanoprus fagi

Scientific classification
- Kingdom: Animalia
- Phylum: Arthropoda
- Class: Insecta
- Order: Coleoptera
- Suborder: Polyphaga
- Infraorder: Cucujiformia
- Family: Silvanidae
- Subfamily: Silvaninae
- Genus: Silvanoprus; Reitter, 1911

= Silvanoprus =

Genus of beetles

Silvanoprus is a genus of beetles in the family Silvanidae, containing the following species:

== Species ==
- Silvanoprus angusticollis Reitter
- Silvanoprus birmanicus Grouvelle
- Silvanoprus cephalotes Reitter
- Silvanoprus desaegeri Lefkovitch
- Silvanoprus distinguendus Sen Gupta & Pal
- Silvanoprus fagi Guerin
- Silvanoprus feae Grouvelle
- Silvanoprus frater Grouvelle
- Silvanoprus indicus Pal & Sen Gupta
- Silvanoprus insidiosus Grouvelle
- Silvanoprus longicollis Reitter
- Silvanoprus orientalis Grouvelle
- Silvanoprus parallelocollis Reitter
- Silvanoprus porrectus Walker
- Silvanoprus scuticollis Walker
- Silvanoprus sikhotensis Krivolutskaja
- Silvanoprus tenuicollis Grouvelle
