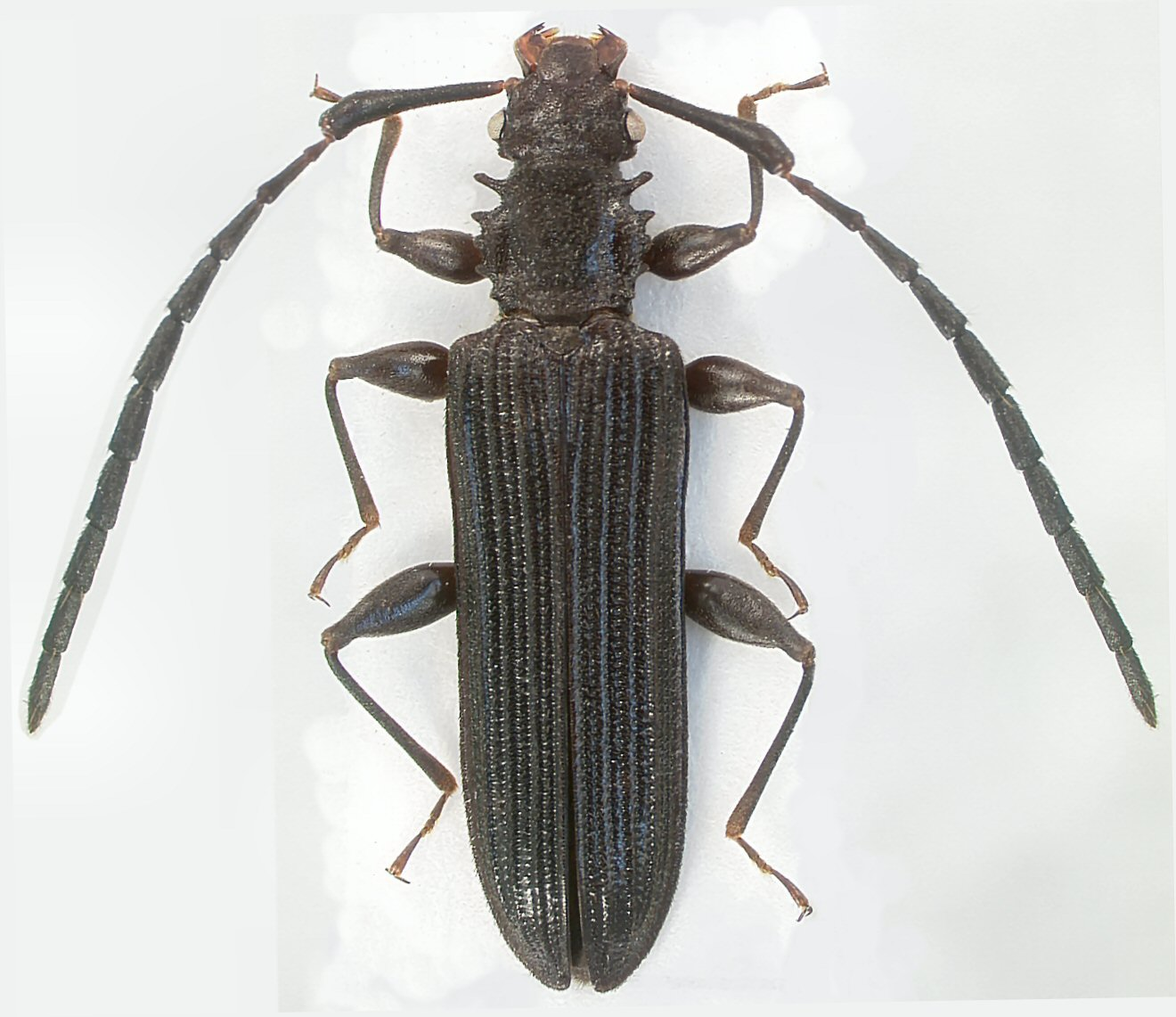
- Macrohyliota spinicollis

Scientific classification
- Kingdom: Animalia
- Phylum: Arthropoda
- Clade: Pancrustacea
- Class: Insecta
- Order: Coleoptera
- Suborder: Polyphaga
- Infraorder: Cucujiformia
- Superfamily: Cucujoidea
- Family: Silvanidae
- Genus: Macrohyliota; Thomas, 2004

= Macrohyliota =

Genus of beetles

Macrohyliota is a genus of beetles in the family Silvanidae. There are six known members of the genus, all occurring in the Asian and Australian regions.

Macrohyliota can be distinguished from other genera in the subfamily Brontinae, tribe Brontini, by their relatively large, loosely jointed bodies, with a brown, granular incrustation that obscures the surface sculpture to a greater or lesser extent (individuals of two included species lack the incrustation). Individuals of most of the species have a tooth or carina on the mesotibia, and in most of the species there are small mandibular horns in the males. Described species and their distributions are:

- Macrohyliota bicolor Arrow, Australia
- Macrohyliota gracilicornis (Arrow), SE Asia, New Guinea
- Macrohyliota lucius (Pascoe), Australia
- Macrohyliota militaris (Erichson), Australia
- Macrohyliota spinicollis (Gory), SE Asia
- Macrohyliota truncatipennis (Heller), SE Asia
