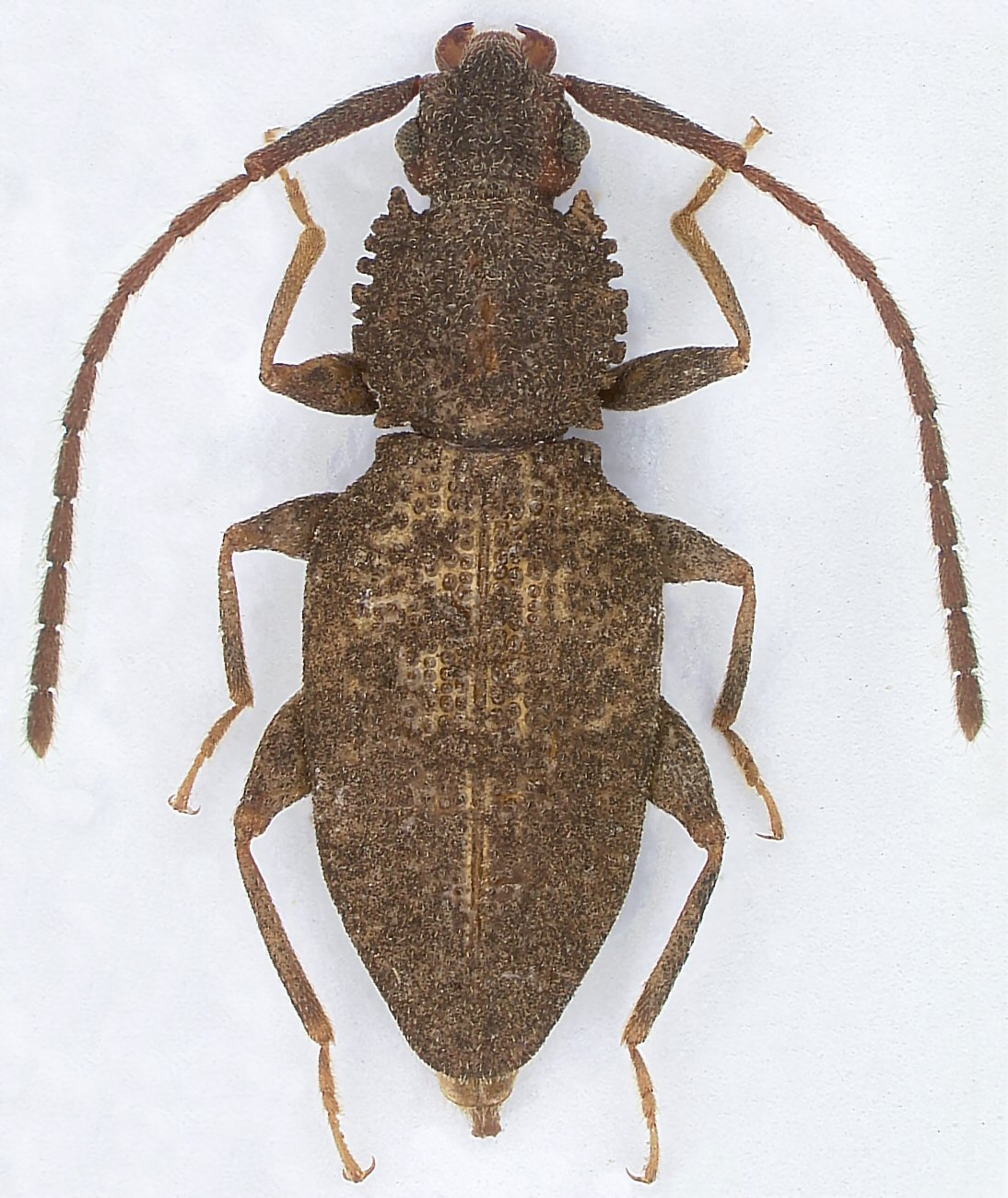
- Brontopriscus sinuatus

Scientific classification
- Kingdom: Animalia
- Phylum: Arthropoda
- Class: Insecta
- Order: Coleoptera
- Suborder: Polyphaga
- Infraorder: Cucujiformia
- Superfamily: Cucujoidea
- Family: Silvanidae
- Genus: Brontopriscus; Sharp, 1886

= Brontopriscus =

Genus of beetles

Brontopriscus is a genus of beetles in the family Silvanidae, subfamily Brontinae. The genus, comprising two species B. sinuatus and B. pleuralis, is found only in New Zealand. Members of Brontopriscus are characterized as broad, dorsally flattened beetles having very long, filiform antennae, wide elytral epipleura, fused elytra, and absence of hind wings.
