= Silvanoprus longicollis =

Scientific classification
- Kingdom: Animalia
- Phylum: Arthropoda
- Class: Insecta
- Order: Coleoptera
- Suborder: Polyphaga
- Infraorder: Cucujiformia
- Family: Silvanidae
- Genus: Silvanoprus
- Species: S. longicollis

Binomial name
- Silvanoprus longicollis (Reitter, 1876)

Synonyms
- Silvanus longicollis Reitter, 1876; Silvanoprus javanicus Grouvelle, 1912

Species of beetle

Silvanoprus longicollis, is a species of silvan flat bark beetle found in India, Sri Lanka, Malaysia, Java, China, Japan, Madagascar and East Africa.

== Description ==
Total length is about 2.17 to 2.38 mm.
