= Calpus =

Calpus bacchi

Scientific classification
- Kingdom: Animalia
- Phylum: Arthropoda
- Class: Insecta
- Order: Coleoptera
- Suborder: Polyphaga
- Infraorder: Cucujiformia
- Family: Silvanidae
- Genus: Calpus; Halstead, 1973
- Species: C. bacchi

Binomial name
- Calpus bacchi Halstead, 1973

Genus of beetles

Calpus bacchi is a species of beetles in the family Silvanidae, the only species in the genus Calpus.
