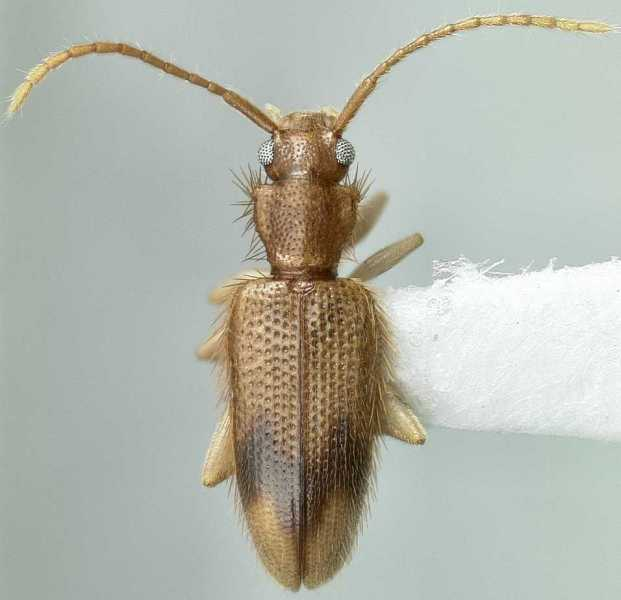
- Telephanus paradoxus

Scientific classification
- Kingdom: Animalia
- Phylum: Arthropoda
- Clade: Pancrustacea
- Class: Insecta
- Order: Coleoptera
- Suborder: Polyphaga
- Infraorder: Cucujiformia
- Family: Silvanidae
- Tribe: Telephanini
- Genus: Telephanus; Erichson, 1845

= Telephanus =

Genus of beetles

Telephanus is a genus of beetles in the family Silvanidae, containing the following species:

- Telephanus acrolophus Thomas
- Telephanus aculeatus Nevermann
- Telephanus acuminatus Grouvelle
- Telephanus agilis Grouvelle
- Telephanus alluaudi Grouvelle
- Telephanus americanus Olivier
- Telephanus apicalis Grouvelle
- Telephanus applanatus Nevermann
- Telephanus argentatus Reitter
- Telephanus armatus Grouvelle
- Telephanus assmanni Nevermann
- Telephanus atricapillus Erichson
- Telephanus barberi Nevermann
- Telephanus basiliscus Nevermann
- Telephanus bipunctatus Schauffuss
- Telephanus blairi Nevermann
- Telephanus brontoides Sharp
- Telephanus bruchi Grouvelle
- Telephanus bucephalus Nevermann
- Telephanus buphthalmus Nevermann
- Telephanus cedius Schauffuss
- Telephanus centralis Sharp
- Telephanus immaculatus Sharp
- Telephanus ceraunoides Nevermann
- Telephanus consimilis Nevermann
- Telephanus costaricensis Nevermann
- Telephanus nigricornis Nevermann
- Telephanus cribratus Grouvelle
- Telephanus crux Grouvelle
- Telephanus cubanus Nevermann
- Telephanus darlingtoni Nevermann
- Telephanus declivis Nevermann
- Telephanus decoratus Grouvelle
- Telephanus dentatus Nevermann
- Telephanus diabolicus Nevermann
- Telephanus dilutus Reitter
- Telephanus dromioides Sharp
- Telephanus dubitalis Grouvelle
- Telephanus dubius Grouvelle
- Telephanus elongatus Grouvelle
- Telephanus fallax Grouvelle
- Telephanus flohri Nevermann
- Telephanus glycerius Nevermann
- Telephanus gomyi Thomas
- Telephanus gracilicornis Sharp
- Telephanus gracilis Schaufuss
- Telephanus grossicornis Nevermann
- Telephanus guadelupensis Grouvelle
- Telephanus guanacasteco Nevermann
- Telephanus haitianus Nevermann
- Telephanus haroldi Schauffuss
- Telephanus hirsutus Nevermann
- Telephanus horridus Nevermann
- Telephanus humeralifer Nevermann
- Telephanus humerosus Reitter
- Telephanus igrolateralis Nevermann
- Telephanus insignis Grouvelle
- Telephanus juvencus Nevermann
- Telephanus kuntzeni Nevermann
- Telephanus lecontei Casey
- Telephanus leptos Nevermann
- Telephanus longulus Nevermann
- Telephanus megacephalus Nevermann
- Telephanus melanchlorus Nevermann
- Telephanus melanocephalus Grouvelle
- Telephanus mexicanus Sharp
- Telephanus micans Grouvelle
- Telephanus minutus Grouvelle
- Telephanus niger Reitter
- Telephanus nigricollis Sharp
- Telephanus nigroflavus Nevermann
- Telephanus nodicornis Nevermannn
- Telephanus obscurus Grouvelle
- Telephanus ornatus Reitter
- Telephanus ovalis Grouvelle
- Telephanus pallidulus Chevrolat
- Telephanus pallidus Reitter
- Telephanus panamensis Nevermann
- Telephanus paradoxus Reitter
- Telephanus parallelus Grouvelle
- Telephanus parvulus Grouvelle
- Telephanus pilicornis Reitter
- Telephanus procerulus Reitter
- Telephanus pubescens Grouvelle
- Telephanus pulchellus Reitter
- Telephanus pygmaeus Nevermann
- Telephanus quadripunctatus Schaufuss
- Telephanus reductus Schauffuss
- Telephanus ruficollis Nevermann
- Telephanus sahlbergi Grouvelle
- Telephanus scabrosicollis Nevermann
- Telephanus schwarzi Nevermann
- Telephanus sellatus Sharp
- Telephanus serratus Nevermann
- Telephanus setulosus Sharp
- Telephanus sharpi Arrow
- Telephanus signatus Grouvelle
- Telephanus silvestris Nevermann
- Telephanus similis Grouvelle
- Telephanus simplicicollis Sharp
- Telephanus spinosus Grouvelle
- Telephanus squalidus Nevermann
- Telephanus strictus Grouvelle
- Telephanus subpubescens Grouvelle
- Telephanus tabaciphilus Nevermann
- Telephanus terminatus Grouvelle
- Telephanus titschacki Nevermann
- Telephanus turrialbensis Nevermann
- Telephanus velox Haldeman
- Telephanus wahlbergi Grouvelle
