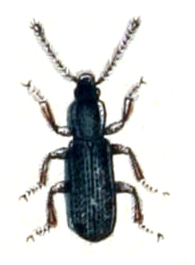
- Airaphilus elongatus

Scientific classification
- Kingdom: Animalia
- Phylum: Arthropoda
- Class: Insecta
- Order: Coleoptera
- Suborder: Polyphaga
- Infraorder: Cucujiformia
- Family: Silvanidae
- Genus: Airaphilus; Redtenbacher, 1858

= Airaphilus =

Genus of beetles

Airaphilus is a genus of beetles in the family Silvanidae, containing the following species:

- Airaphilus calabricus Obenberger
- Airaphilus carpetanus Heyden
- Airaphilus chotanicus Semen.
- Airaphilus corsicus Grouvelle
- Airaphilus depressus Reitter
- Airaphilus elongatus Gyllenhal
- Airaphilus fallax Grouvelle
- Airaphilus ferrugineus Kraatz
- Airaphilus filiformis Reitter
- Airaphilus grouvellei Reitter
- Airaphilus hellenicus Obenberger
- Airaphilus hirtulus Reitter
- Airaphilus kaszabi Ratti
- Airaphilus madagascariensis Grouvelle
- Airaphilus martini Grouvelle
- Airaphilus montisatri Peyerimhoff
- Airaphilus nasutus Chevrolat
- Airaphilus natavidadei Peyerimhoff
- Airaphilus nubigena Wollaston
- Airaphilus paganettii Obenberger
- Airaphilus perangustus
- Airaphilus raffrayi Grouvelle
- Airaphilus seabrai Luna de Carvalho
- Airaphilus semenowi Reitter
- Airaphilus seminiger Grouvelle
- Airaphilus serricollis Reitter
- Airaphilus siculus Reitter
- Airaphilus simoni Grouvelle
- Airaphilus subferrugineus Reitter
- Airaphilus syriacus Grouvelle
- Airaphilus vaulogeri Grouvelle
