= Eunausibius =

Scientific classification
- Kingdom: Animalia
- Phylum: Arthropoda
- Class: Insecta
- Order: Coleoptera
- Suborder: Polyphaga
- Infraorder: Cucujiformia
- Family: Silvanidae
- Genus: Eunausibius; Grouvelle, 1912

Genus of beetles

Eunausibius is a genus of beetles in the family Silvanidae, containing the following species:

- Eunausibius elongatus Grouvelle
- Eunausibius lophius Parsons
- Eunausibius salutaris Parsons
- Eunausibius tenebrionoides Grouvelle
- Eunausibius wheeleri Schwarz & Barber
