= Cathartus =

Cathartus quadricollis

Scientific classification
- Kingdom: Animalia
- Phylum: Arthropoda
- Class: Insecta
- Order: Coleoptera
- Suborder: Polyphaga
- Infraorder: Cucujiformia
- Family: Silvanidae
- Genus: Cathartus; Reiche, 1854
- Species: C. quadricollis

Binomial name
- Cathartus quadricollis (Guerin-Meneville)

Synonyms
- Cathartus cassiae Reiche, 1854; Cathartus gemellatus (Jacquelin du Val, 1857); Silvanus cassiae; Silvanus gemellatus Jacquelin du Val, 1857; Silvanus quadricollis Guérin-Méneville, 1844

Species of beetle

Cathartus quadricollis, the square-necked grain beetle, is a species of beetles in the family Silvanidae, the only species in the genus Cathartus.
