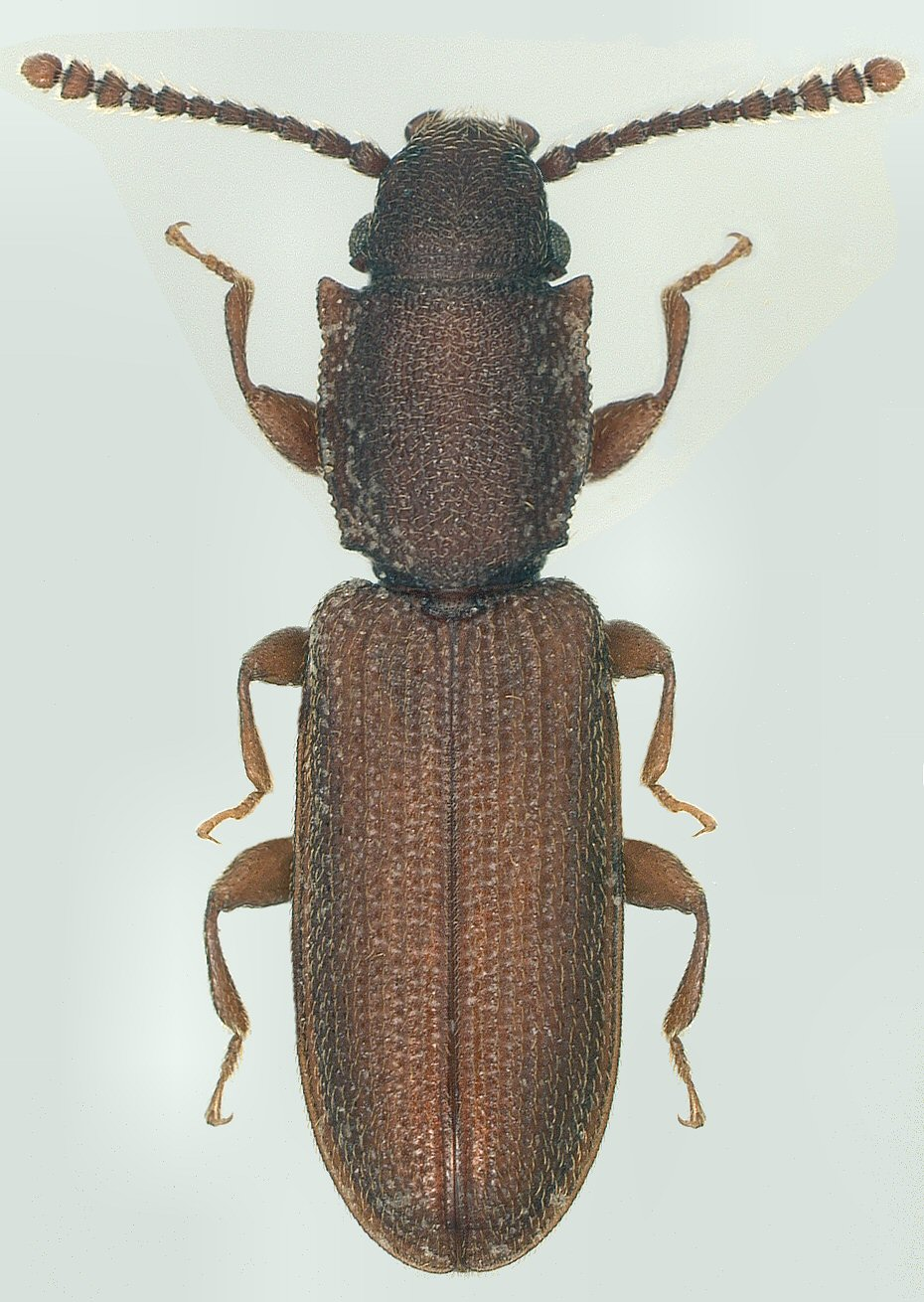
- Pensus gilae

Scientific classification
- Kingdom: Animalia
- Phylum: Arthropoda
- Class: Insecta
- Order: Coleoptera
- Suborder: Polyphaga
- Infraorder: Cucujiformia
- Family: Silvanidae
- Genus: Pensus; Halstead, 1973

= Pensus =

Genus of beetles

Pensus is a genus of beetles in the family Silvanidae. A member of the subfamily Silvaninae, Pensus contains two species, Pensus gilae (Casey) and Pensus guatemalenus (Sharp), with a combined range of the southwestern United States to Guatemala.
