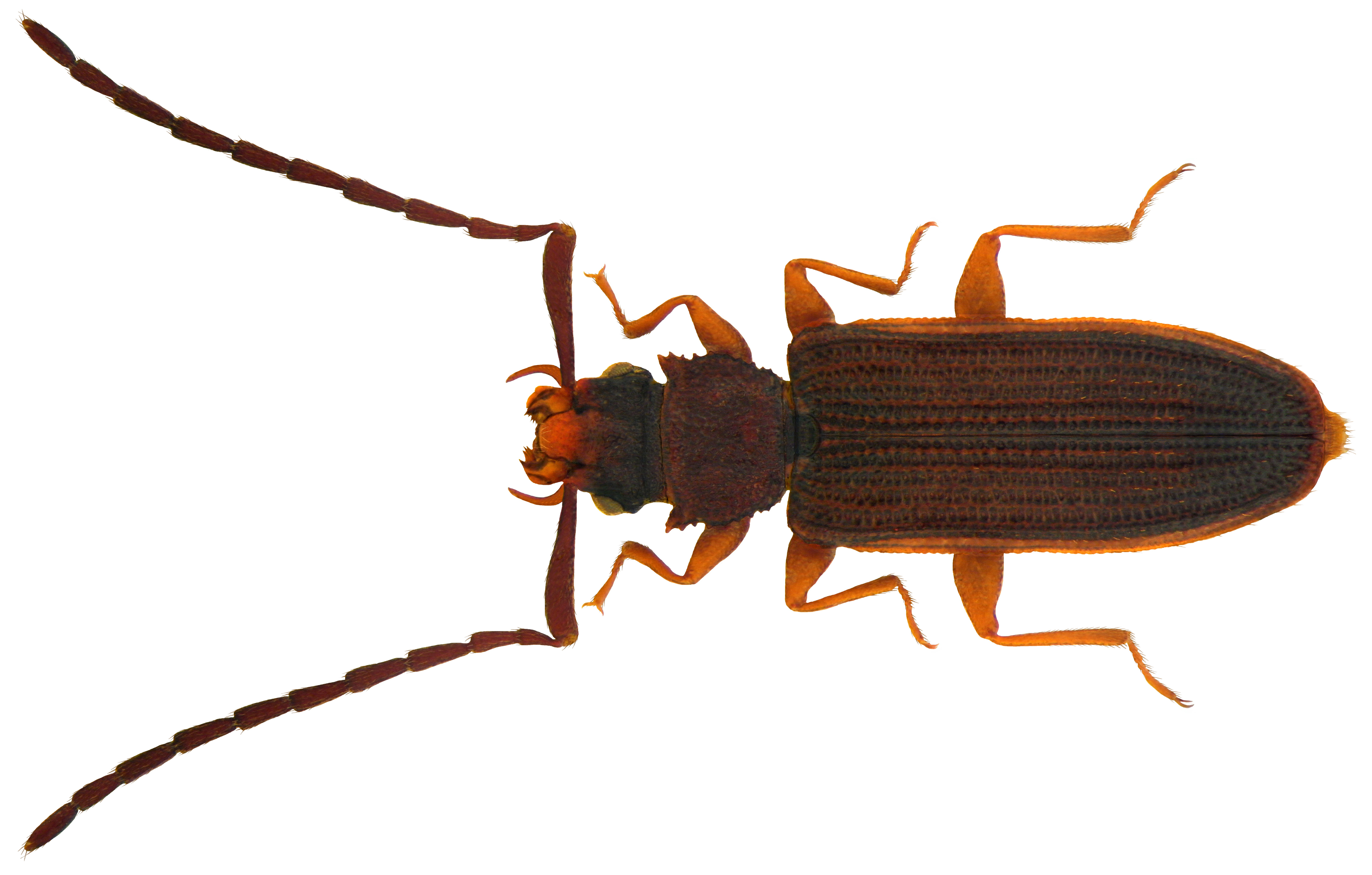
- Uleiota planata

Scientific classification
- Kingdom: Animalia
- Phylum: Arthropoda
- Clade: Pancrustacea
- Class: Insecta
- Order: Coleoptera
- Suborder: Polyphaga
- Infraorder: Cucujiformia
- Superfamily: Cucujoidea
- Family: Silvanidae; Kirby, 1837

Subfamilies
- Brontinae; Silvaninae

= Silvanidae =

Silvanidae Temporal range: Cenomanian–Recent

Family of beetles

Silvanidae, "silvan flat bark beetles", is a family of beetles in the superfamily Cucujoidea, consisting of 68 described genera and about 500 described species. The family is represented on all continents except Antarctica, and is most diverse at both the generic and species levels in the Old World tropics.

== Description ==
Silvanids generally are small, brownish, flattened, pubescent and densely punctured beetles ranging from 1.2-15mm in length, and mostly with a 5-5-5 tarsal formula. They have short, strongly clubbed, to very elongate antennae, and frequently grooves or carinae on the head and/or pronotum. Many genera have the lateral margins of the pronotum dentate or denticulate. The family is divided unequally into two subfamilies: Brontinae and Silvaninae. The Brontinae, arranged in two tribes (Brontini and Telephanini) of 10 genera each, are larger, loosely jointed beetles with long antennae, an especially elongate scape, inverted male genitalia, and mandibular mycangia. Both brontine tribes have recently been reviewed at the genus level. The Silvaninae, which has not been divided into tribes, consists of 48 genera of mostly smaller beetles characterized by their closed procoxal cavities, mostly without mandibular mycangia, and non-inverted male genitalia.

== Taxonomy ==
The largest genera are Telephanus (109 species), Psammoecus (81 species), and Cryptamorpha (27 species) (all Brontinae: Telephanini) and the Old World silvanine genus Airaphilus (35 species). There have been a number of major taxonomic studies in the Silvanidae in recent decades, including Halstead (1973), Sen Gupta and Pal (1996), Pal (1981, 1985), and Karner (1995, 2012).

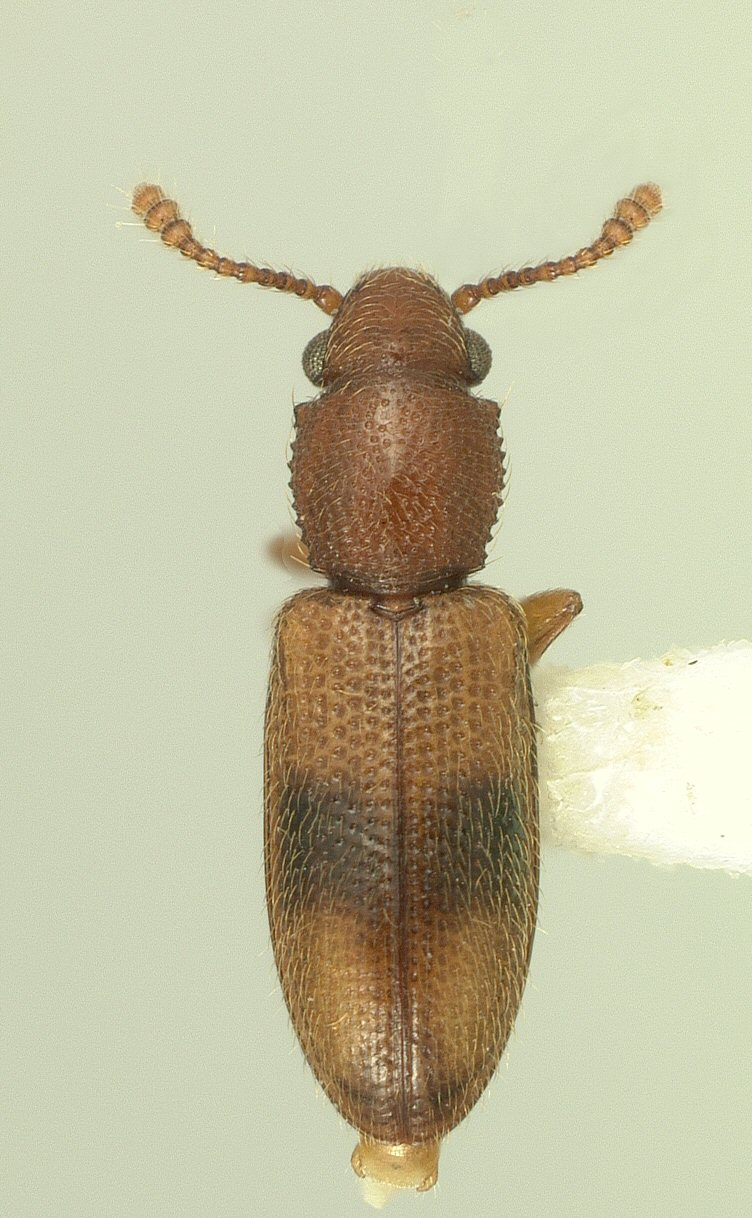
Dorsal habitus of Monanus concinnulus.

Investigations into the phylogenetic relationships within the family and between the Silvanidae and other cucujoids are at the preliminary stages. A phylogenetic analysis of the "primitive" cucujoids using morphological characters of larvae and adults found a close relationship between the Silvanidae and Cucujidae. A molecular phylogenetic study primarily aimed at clarifying the status of the more "advanced" cucujoids nevertheless included exemplars of the basal taxa. It showed a close relationship between Passandridae and Silvanidae, and a more distant one with Cucujidae.

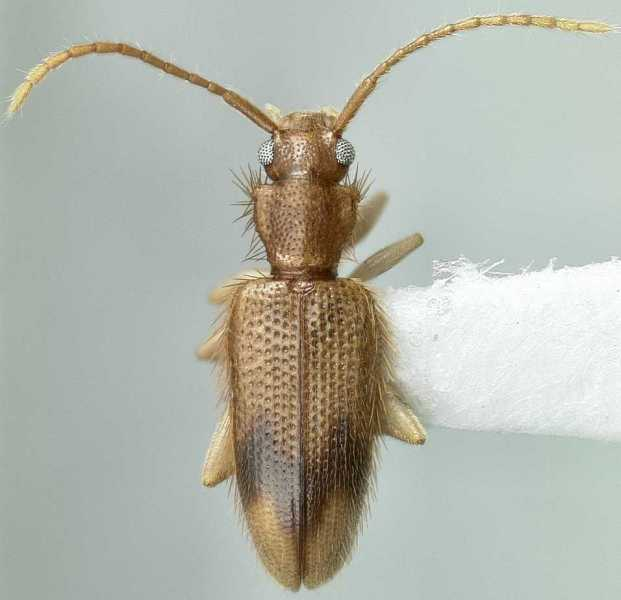
Dorsal habitus of Telephanus paradoxus.

== Biology and habitats ==
Although all silvanids seem to be primarily fungivorous, the habitat where the various taxa are found varies. Members of the tribe Brontini primarily are found under dead bark, although Brontoliota are found on the outside of dead wood lying on the ground in wet forests and Protodendrophagus occur under rocks in alpine areas of New Zealand. Brontini do not have lobed tarsomeres. Members of Telephanini usually occur on withered, pendant leaves, especially of Musaceae and Heliconiaceae. Telephanini usually have lobed tarsomeres. Silvaninae are found in subcortical habitats as well as in leaf-litter and soil. Two genera, Nepharis and Nepharinus, are inquilines of ants in Australia, and two species of Coccidotrophus and one of Eunausibius occur in the petioles of ant-plants (Tachigalia spp.) in the American tropics, where they feed on honeydew produced by a mealybug (Hemiptera: Pseudococcidae).

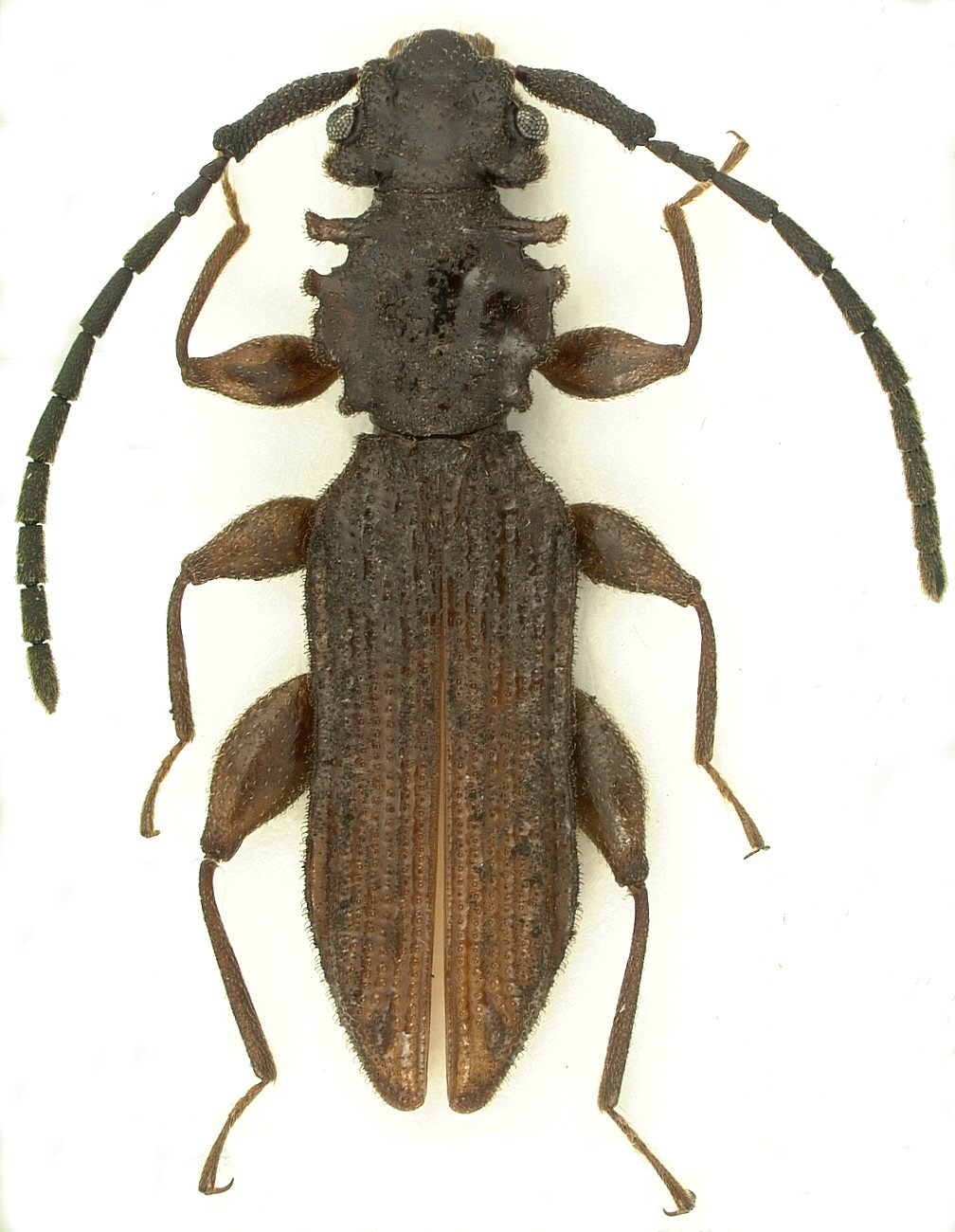
Dorsal habitus of Brontoliota lawrencei.

Ten genera are represented by species that have been moved widely through commerce and now have worldwide or nearly worldwide distributions (e.g., Ahasverus, Oryzaephilus, Silvanus, Cryptamorpha, Monanus.) The most economically important genus is Oryzaephilus, with two common stored products pest species (O. surinamensis (L.), the sawtoothed grain beetle, and O. mercator (Fauvel), the merchant grain beetle), and several others that are sporadic pests Other economically important stored products pests include Ahasverus advena (Waltl), Cathartus quadricollis (Guerin-Meneville), and Nausibius clavicornis (Kugelann).

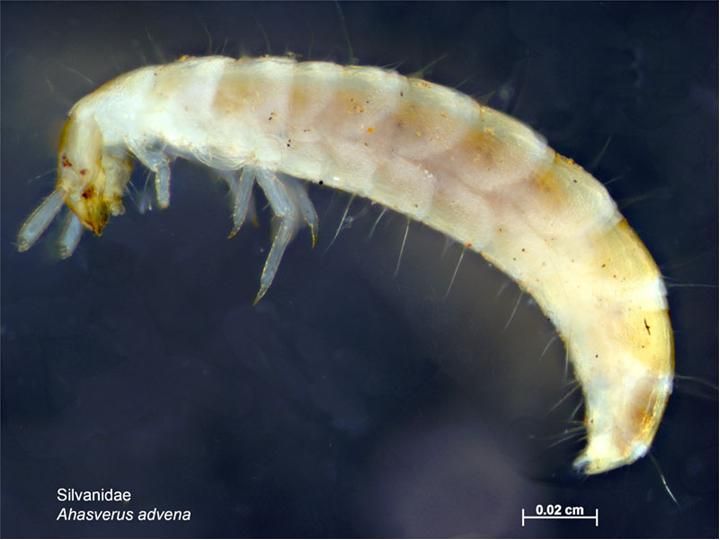
Larva

== Genera ==
- Acathartus Grouvelle, 1912
- Acorimus Halstead, 1980
- Afrocorimus Halstead, 1980
- Afronausibius Halstead, 1980
- Ahasverus Des Gozis, 1881
- Airaphilus Redtenbacher, 1858
- Aplatamus Grouvelle, 1912
- Astilpnus Perris, 1866
- Australodendrophagus Thomas, 2004
- Australohyliota Thomas, 2004
- Austronausibius Halstead, 1980
- Austrophanus Thomas 2008
- Brontoliota Thomas, 2004
- Brontopriscus Sharp, 1886
- Calpus Halstead, 1973
- Cathartosilvanus Grouvelle, 1913
- Cathartus Reiche, 1854
- Coccidotrophus Schwarz & Barber, 1921
- Cryptamorpha Wollaston, 1854
- Dendrophagella Thomas, 2004
- Dendrophagus Schoenherr, 1809
- Eunausibius Grouvelle, 1912
- Euplatamus Sharp 1899
- Indophanus Pal, 1982
- Macrohyliota Thomas, 2004
- Megahyliota Thomas, 2004
- Megapsammoecus Karner, 1995
- Metacorimus Halstead, 1997
- Microhyliota Thomas, 2004
- Monanus Sharp, 1879
- Nausibius Redtenbacher, 1858
- Neosilvanus Grouvelle, 1912
- Nepharinus Grouvelle, 1912
- Nepharis Laporte de Castelnau, 1869
- Notophanus Thomas, 2011
- Oryzaephilus Ganglbauer, 1899
- Parahyliota Thomas, 2004
- Parasilvanus Grouvelle, 1912
- Pensus Halstead, 1973
- Protodendrophagus Thomas, 2004
- Protosilvanus Grouvelle, 1912
- Psammaechidius Fairmaire, 1869
- Psammoecus Latreille in Cuvier, 1829
- Pseudonausibius Halstead, 1980
- Pseudosilvanus Grouvelle, 1912
- Saunibius Halstead, 1997
- Silvaninus Grouvelle, 1912
- Silvanoides Halstead, 1973
- Silvanolomus Reitter, 1912
- Silvanoprus Reitter, 1911
- Silvanops Grouvelle, 1912
- Silvanopsis Grouvelle, 1892
- Silvanosoma Brèthes, 1922
- Silvanus Latreille, 1807
- Synobius Sharp, 1899
- Synoemis Pascoe, 1863
- Telephanus Erichson, 1845
- Uleiota Latreille, 1796

=== Extinct genera ===
- Subfamily Brontinae Erichson, 1845
  - Tribe Brontini Erichson, 1845
    - †Cretoliota Liu, Slipiñski, Wang et Pang, 2019 Burmese amber, Myanmar, Mid Cretaceous (latest Albian-earliest Cenomanian)
    - †Protoliota Liu Slipiñski, Wang et Pang, 2019 Burmese amber, Myanmar, Mid Cretaceous (latest Albian-earliest Cenomanian)
