= Silvano (given name) =

Silvano is an Italian male given name.

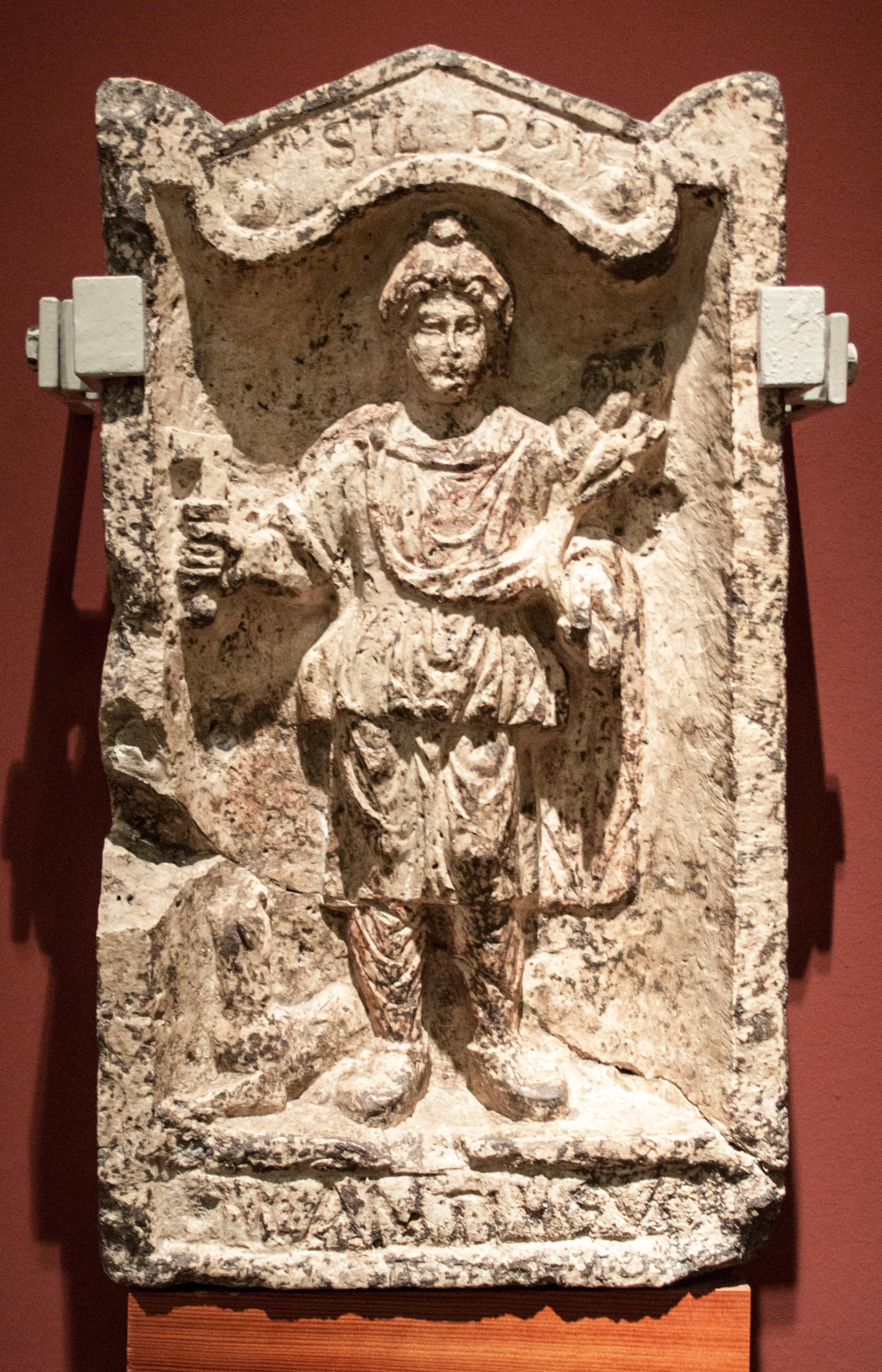
Religious sculpture of the Roman god Silvano

== Variants ==
- Hypocorism: Sila
- Female: Silvana

=== Variants in other languages ===
- French: Sylvain
- Ancient French: Seleuin
- Biblycal Greek:Σιλουανός (Silouanos), Σιλβανός (Silvanos)
- Hypocorist: Σίλας (Silas)
- English: Sylvanus
- Latin: Silvanus
- Polish: Sylwan
- Slovachian/German: Silvan
- Hungary: Szilvánusz

== Origins ==
The name derives from the Latin name Silvanus, based on the adjective of the same name, with the meaning of "silvano", "silvestre", "who lives in the forest", "which comes from the forest" (as it is based on silva, "selva", "wood" ). The names Silvio, Silverio, Selvaggio and Silvestro can also be traced back to the same term, which therefore have a similar meaning to Silvano.

The name is present both in Roman mythology, where Silvano is the god of the forests, and in the New Testament, where it is taken by Silvano, one of Paul's traveling companions: he is also called "Sila". It is an Italianization of the biblical Greek Σίλας (Silas), which is an abbreviation of Σιλουανός (Silouanos).

== Name days ==
Numerous saints have borne this name; the name day can be celebrated on any of the following dates:

- February 6, St. Silvanus of Emesa, bishop and martyr
- February 10, San Silvano di Terracina, bishop
- 4 May, Saint Sylvan of Gaza, bishop and martyr with thirty-nine other companions in the mines of Mismiyā, in Palestine
- July 10, San Silvano, martyr with San Bianore in Pisidia
- 10 July, San Silvano (or Silano), martyr venerated in Romagnano Sesia (perhaps one of the sons of Santa Felicita)
- July 13, St. Silas, a disciple of the Apostles
- August 21, San Silvano, martyr in Friuli
- 4 September, Saint Silvanus, a child martyr with Silvano and Vitalico in Ankara
- September 22, Saint Sylvan of Levroux, confessor at Bourges
- September 24, Saint Silvanus of Mount Athos, ascetic and Orthodox monk
- 2 December, St. Silvanus, bishop in Phrygia

== People with the given name ==
=== Sports ===
- Silvano Abbà, pentathlete and Italian soldier
- Silvano Barco, former Italian cross-country skier
- Silvano Basagni, Italian skeet shooter
- Silvano Beltrametti, sports manager and former Swiss alpine skier
- Silvano Benedetti, sports manager and former Italian footballer
- Silvano Bertini, former Italian boxer
- Silvano Bresadola, Italian footballer
- Silvano Chesani, Italian high jumper
- Silvano Ciampi, Italian road cyclist and sports manager
- Silvano Contini, former Italian road cyclist
- Silvano Fontolan, football coach and former Italian footballer
- Silvano Martina, sports attorney and former Italian footballer
- Silvano Meconi, Italian weightlifter
- Silvano Meli, former Swiss alpine skier
- Silvano Moro, Italian footballer and football coach
- Silvano Poropat, Croatian basketball coach
- Silvano Prandi, volleyball coach and former Italian volleyball player
- Silvano Raganini, Olympic sports shooter from San Marino
- Silvano Raggio Garibaldi, Italian footballer
- Silvano Schiavon, Italian road cyclist
- Silvano Simeon, Italian discus thrower
- Silvano Vigni, Italian jockey
- Silvano Villa, former Italian footballer

=== Arts and entertainment ===
- Silvano Agosti (born 1938), Italian film director
- Silvano Albanese, stage name Coez, Italian singer-songwriter and rapper
- Sylvano Bussotti, Italian composer and artist
- Silvano Campeggi, Italian painter
- Silvano Carroli, Italian baritone
- Silvano Tranquilli, Italian actor and voice actor

=== Other ===
- Silvano, founder of the House of Gravina, a noble family of Norman origin
- Silvano Arieti, Italian psychiatrist
- Silvano Ceccherini, Italian anarchist and writer
- Silvano Donati, Italian physicist in the field of photonics
- Silvano Ippoliti, Italian director of photography
- Silvano Miniati, Italian trade unionist and politician
- Silvano Moffa, Italian politician and journalist
- Silvano Montevecchi, Italian Catholic bishop
- Silvano Piovanelli, Italian Catholic cardinal and archbishop

== See also ==
- Silvano (disambiguation)
- Silvano (surname)
- Silas (name)
