= Sylvan =

Sylvan or Sylvans (from the Latin silva: "forest, woods") can have one of the following meanings:

== A countryside scene ==
The term "A Sylvan Scene" is used to describe a beautiful and idealised scene in the countryside.

Historical reference: John Milton used these words in Paradise Lost (1667) to describe “A Steep Wilderness”: “Cedar, and pine, and fir, and branching palm, A sylvan scene, and as the ranks ascend Shade above shade, a woody theater Of stateliest view.”

Current reference: Collins dictionary: Sylvan describes an association with woods and trees.

== Places ==
=== United States ===
- Sylvan, Illinois, a former settlement
- Sylvan, Wisconsin, a town
  - Sylvan (community), Wisconsin, an unincorporated area in the town
- Sylvan Township (disambiguation)
- Sylvan Lake (disambiguation)
- Sylvan Pass (Wyoming), a mountain pass in Yellowstone National Park
- Sylvan-Highlands, Portland, Oregon, a neighborhood of Portland, Oregon
  - West Haven-Sylvan, Oregon, a neighboring unincorporated area
- Sylvan Beach, New York
- Penn's Sylvania (Penn's Woods), the Province of Pennsylvania which was the kernel of the later state

=== Canada ===
- Sylvan Lake (Alberta)
- Sylvan, a community in the municipality of North Middlesex, Ontario

== Arts and entertainment ==
- Sylvan (band), a German progressive rock band
- Sylvan Esso, an American indie pop band
- Sylvan (TV series), a Spanish animated series created by Antoni D'Ocón
- Sylvan Campaign, a faction in the video game Heroes of Might and Magic V
- Sylvan, a pseudonym used by the Baltic-German author Alexander von Ungern-Sternberg

== Other uses ==
- Sylvan (name), a list of people with either the given name or surname
- Sylvan Debating Club, a free speech society in London
- Sylvan, a Latin adjective meaning of or from the woodland
- Sylvan Learning, a remedial and enrichment tutoring company
- Sylvans S.C., a football club based on the Channel Island of Guernsey
- another name for 2-methyl furan, a flammable liquid

== See also ==
- 519 Sylvania, asteroid
- Silvan (disambiguation)
- Silvania (disambiguation)
- Silvanus (disambiguation)
- Silvanus (mythology), Roman deity from whom the adjective sylvan derives
- Sylvain (disambiguation)
- Sylvania (disambiguation)
