= Sylvania =

Sylvania (Latin for "forest land" or "woods") may refer to:

== Companies trading as Sylvania ==
- Sylvania Electric Products, a former major American diversified electrical and electronics manufacturer
- Sylvania (brand), its Canadian lighting products division which continues to license to both Havells Sylvania and Osram Sylvania
- Osram Sylvania, an American lighting manufacturer owned by Osram AG of Germany
- Sylvania Lighting, an international lighting manufacturer owned by Shanghai Feilo Acoustics Ltd

== Education ==
- Sylvania City School District, in Northwest Ohio, United States
- Sylvania High School, in Sydney, New South Wales, Australia

== Places ==
=== United States ===
- Sylvania, Alabama
- Sylvania, Arkansas
- Sylvania, Georgia
- Sylvania, Indiana
- Sylvania, Louisville, Kentucky
- Sylvania, Missouri
- Sylvania, Ohio
- Sylvania, Pennsylvania
- Sylvania, Wisconsin
- Mount Sylvania, in Oregon
- Sylvania Mountains, in California and Nevada
- Sylvania Township (disambiguation)
- Sylvania Wilderness, in Michigan

=== Other places ===
- Sylvania, New South Wales, a suburb of Sydney, Australia
- Sylvania, Saskatchewan, Canada

== Fictional locations ==
- Sylvania (Warhammer), the fictitious realm of the Vampire Counts in the Warhammer Fantasy Battle game
- Sylvania, a fictional country from the movie Duck Soup (1933)
- Sylvania, a fictional country from the comedy film The Love Parade (1929)
- Sylvania, the fictional home of the Sylvanian Families toy line

== Ships ==
- SS Sylvania, an American lake freighter
- RMS Sylvania, a British ocean liner
- USS Sylvania, various ships of the United States Navy

== Other uses ==
- 519 Sylvania, an asteroid
- Sylvania (McCormick County, South Carolina), an historic house
- Sylvania Airport, in Wisconsin
- Sylvania Watkins (born 1985), American basketball player
- The Sylvania, an historic apartment building in Indianapolis, Indiana
- Sylvania, a genus of bacteria in the family Enterobacteriaceae

== See also ==
- Sylvan (disambiguation)
- Sylvana (disambiguation)
- Silvania (disambiguation)
- Leesylvania, Virginia
- Mount Sylvania
- Pennsylvania
- Pittsylvania
- Rushsylvania, Ohio
- Spotsylvania County, Virginia
- Syldavia
- Transylvania
