= Sylvan Lake =

Sylvan Lake may refer to:

== Communities ==
- Sylvan Lake, Alberta, Canada
- Sylvan Lake, Michigan, United States
- Sylvan Lake, New York, United States

== Lakes ==
- Sylvan Lake (Alberta), Canada
- Sylvan Lake (Colorado), United States
- Sylvan Lake (Florida), United States
- Sylvan Lake (Indiana), United States
- Sylvan Lake (Cass County, Minnesota), United States
- Sylvan Lake (Grant County, Minnesota), United States
- Sylvan Lake (New Jersey), United States
- Sylvan Lake (Montana), Sanders County, Montana, United States
- Sylvan Lake (New York), United States
- Sylvan Lake (South Dakota), United States
- Lake Sylvan (New Zealand), near Paradise

== See also ==
- Silvan Lake, a lake in Georgia
