= Sylvan Township, Michigan =

Sylvan Township is the name of some places in the U.S. state of Michigan:

- Sylvan Township, Osceola County, Michigan
- Sylvan Township, Washtenaw County, Michigan

See also

- Sylvan Township (disambiguation)
