= Silvan =

Silvan may refer to:

== People ==
=== First name ===
- Saint Silvan, Christian martyr
- Silvan Inia (born 1969), Dutch footballer
- Silvan Kindle (1936–2025), alpine skier from Liechtenstein
- Silvan Shalom (born 1958), Tunisian-born Israeli politician

=== Pseudonym or family name ===
- Aldo Savoldello "Silvan" (born 1937), Italian magician
- Gheorghe Becescu-Silvan (1875–1924), Romanian writer, politician, and mountaineer

== Places ==
- Silvan, Diyarbakır, city in the Diyarbakır Province of Turkey
  - Silvan ambush, 2011 ambush by the PKK
- Silvan, Victoria, suburb of Melbourne, Australia

== Other uses ==
- Silvan Byggemarked, Danish chain store that sells building materials
- Silvan Elves, woodland elves of J. R. R. Tolkien's Middle-earth legendarium

== See also ==
- Silvanus (disambiguation)
- Silvanus (mythology), Roman deity from whom the adjective sylvan derives
- Sylvain (disambiguation)
- Sylvan (disambiguation)
