= Chimpanzee (disambiguation) =

The chimpanzee or common chimpanzee is a species of great ape native to the forests and savannahs of tropical Africa.

Chimpanzee may also refer to:

- Chimpanzee (film), a 2012 nature film
- Chimpanzees, the two member species of the genus Pan
- French patrol boat Chimpanzé, in service 1917–19

== See also ==
- Chimp (disambiguation)
- Pygmy chimpanzee or bonobo, an endangered species of great ape
