= Silvano (surname) =

Silvano is a surname. Notable people with the surname include:

- Cristina Silvano, Italian computer engineer
- Judi Silvano (born 1951), American jazz singer and composer
- José Silvano (born 1980), Spanish footballer

== See also ==
- Silvano (disambiguation)
- Silvano (given name)
- Silvani
