= Silvano =

Silvano may refer to:

- Silvano (given name)
- Silvano (surname)
- Silvano (opera), an 1895 opera by Pietro Mascagni
- Silvano Rogi, a character from the television series Camera Café
- Da Silvano, a former Italian restaurant in Manhattan, New York City
- Silvano, a 1983 fatal insomnia patient

== See also ==
- Silvano d'Orba, a comune in Alessandria, Piedmont, Italy
- Silvano Pietra, a comune in Pavia, Lombardy, Italy
- Silvani
