= Silvania =

Silvania may refer to:

- Silvania, Brazil, a municipality in southcentral Goiás state, Brazil
- Silvania, Colombia, a town and municipality in Cundinamarca Department, Colombia
- Silvania County, a designation for Sălaj County, Romania
- Silvania National College, a college in Transylvanian city of Zalău, Romania
- 69th Mixed Artillery Brigade Silvania, a military unit of the Romanian Army
- FC Silvania, a football club from Șimleu Silvaniei, Romania
- Acanthophila silvania, a moth from the family of Gelechiidae
- Silvania (bacterium), a genus of gram-negative bacteria in the family Enterobacteriaceae
- Silvania (Band), a Peruvian band

== See also ==
- Sylvania (disambiguation)
