= Acanthophila beljaevi =

Scientific classification
- Kingdom: Animalia
- Phylum: Arthropoda
- Class: Insecta
- Order: Lepidoptera
- Family: Gelechiidae
- Genus: Acanthophila
- Species: A. beljaevi

Binomial name
- Acanthophila beljaevi Ponomarenko, 1998

Synonyms
- Dichomeris beljaevi (Ponomarenko, 1998)

Species of moth

Acanthophila beljaevi is a moth in the family Gelechiidae. It is found in the Russian Far East, where it is known only from the southern part of Primorsky Krai.

== Description ==
The wingspan is 12–13 mm. The pattern of the forewings is similar to Acanthophila kuznetzovi. The hindwings are grey.

== Etymology ==
The species is named for Dr. E. A. Belyaev of the Institute of Biology and Pedology in Vladivostok, who collected the type series.
