= Silvanus muticus =

Scientific classification
- Kingdom: Animalia
- Phylum: Arthropoda
- Class: Insecta
- Order: Coleoptera
- Suborder: Polyphaga
- Infraorder: Cucujiformia
- Family: Silvanidae
- Genus: Silvanus
- Species: S. muticus

Binomial name
- Silvanus muticus Sharp, 1899

Species of beetle

Silvanus muticus is a species of silvanid flat bark beetle in the family Silvanidae. It is found in Central America and North America.
