= Acanthophila pusillella =

Scientific classification
- Kingdom: Animalia
- Phylum: Arthropoda
- Class: Insecta
- Order: Lepidoptera
- Family: Gelechiidae
- Genus: Acanthophila
- Species: A. pusillella

Binomial name
- Acanthophila pusillella Ponomarenko & Omelko, 2003

Synonyms
- Dichomeris pusillella (Ponomarenko & Omelko, 2003)

Species of moth

Acanthophila pusillella is a moth in the family Gelechiidae. It is found in the Russian Far East, where it is known only from the southern part of Primorsky Krai.

== Description ==
The wingspan is 9.5–10 mm. The forewings are dark grey with scattered light grey scales. The hindwings are grey.
