= Silvina =

Silvina is a given name. It is a variant of Silvana, meaning "one who lives in the forest".

== People with the name ==
- Silvina Bosco, Argentine actress
- Silvina Bullrich (1915–1990), Argentine writer
- Silvina Chediek (born 1962), Argentine journalist and presenter
- Silvina Corvalán (born 1973), Argentine field hockey player
- Silvina D'Elía (born 1986), Argentine field hockey player
- Silvina Fabars (1944–2025), Cuban folk dancer and ballerina
- Silvina Luna (born 1980), Argentina model, actress, and vedette
- Silvina Milstein (born 1956), Argentine composer and scholar
- Silvina Montrul, American linguist
- Silvina Moreno (born 1987), Argentine singer
- Silvina Moschini (born 1972), Argentine entrepreneur
- Silvina Ocampo (1903–1993), Argentine writer
- Silvina Pereira da Silva (born 1948), Brazilian sprinter
- Silvina Reinaudi (born 1942), Argentine writer
- Silvina Schlesinger (born 1985), Argentine handball player
