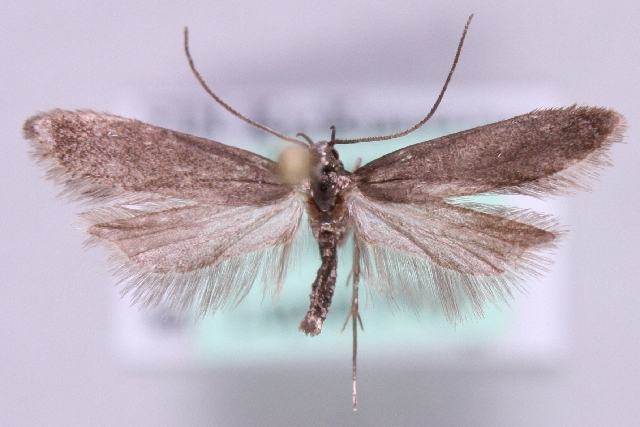
- Acanthophila latipennella

Scientific classification
- Kingdom: Animalia
- Phylum: Arthropoda
- Clade: Pancrustacea
- Class: Insecta
- Order: Lepidoptera
- Family: Gelechiidae
- Subfamily: Dichomeridinae
- Genus: Acanthophila; Heinemann, 1870

Synonyms
- Acantophila Osthelder, 1951 (misspelling); Mimomeris Povolný, 1978 – recognized as a subgenus

= Acanthophila =

Genus of moths

Acanthophila is a moth genus in the subfamily Dichomeridinae of the family Gelechiidae. It occurs in Europe and Asia to the Russian Far East and China.

The larvae feed on lichens, mosses, and trees from the families Pinaceae and Taxodiaceae.

== Species ==
There are 18 species in two subgenera, with some species unassigned to any subgenus:

- Subgenus Acanthophila
  - Acanthophila alacella (Zeller, 1839)
  - Acanthophila beljaevi Ponomarenko, 1998
  - Acanthophila bimaculatus (Liu & Qian, 1994)
  - Acanthophila kuznetzovi Ponomarenko, 1998
  - Acanthophila liui (Li & Zheng, 1996)
  - Acanthophila lucistrialella M.G. Ponomarenko & Omelko, 2003
  - Acanthophila magnimaculata M.G. Ponomarenko & Omelko, 2003
  - Acanthophila pusillella M.G. Ponomarenko & Omelko, 2003
  - Acanthophila qinlingensis Li & Zheng, 1996
  - Acanthophila silvania M.G. Ponomarenko & Omelko, 2003
  - Acanthophila silvestrella M.G. Ponomarenko, 1998
- Subgenus Mimomeris Povolný, 1978
  - Acanthophila hallasana Park, 2023
  - Acanthophila latipennella (Rebel, 1937)
  - Acanthophila obscura (Li & Zheng, 1997)
  - Acanthophila vixidistinctella Ponomarenko & Omelko, 2003
- Incertae sedis
  - Acanthophila angustiptera (Li & Zheng, 1997)
  - Acanthophila imperviella M.G. Ponomarenko & Omelko, 2003
  - Acanthophila nyingchiensis (Li & Zheng, 1996)
