= Acanthophila magnimaculata =

Scientific classification
- Kingdom: Animalia
- Phylum: Arthropoda
- Class: Insecta
- Order: Lepidoptera
- Family: Gelechiidae
- Genus: Acanthophila
- Species: A. magnimaculata

Binomial name
- Acanthophila magnimaculata Ponomarenko & Omelko, 2003

Synonyms
- Dichomeris magnimaculata (Ponomarenko & Omelko, 2003)

Species of moth

Acanthophila magnimaculata is a moth in the family Gelechiidae. It is found in the Russian Far East, where it is known only from the southern part of Primorsky Krai.

== Description ==
The wingspan is 11–12 mm. The wings are dark grey. The forewings have a light grey costal stroke and four indistinct blackish sports, including two larger ones at the middle and end of cell.
