= Sylvan (name) =

Sylvan is a masculine given name and a surname which may refer to:

== Given name ==
- Sylvan Adams (born 1958), Israeli-Canadian businessman
- Sylvan Anderton (born 1934), English footballer
- Sylvan Barnet (1926–2016), American literary critic
- Sylvan Ebanks-Blake (born 1986), English footballer
- Sylvan Byck (1904–1982), American comic strip editor
- Sylvan Edwards (born 1979), English rugby union player
- Sylvan Fox (1928–2007), American journalist
- Sylvan Friedman (1908–1979), American politician
- Sylvan Goldman (1898–1984), American businessman
- Sylvan Gotshal (1897–1968), American lawyer
- Sylvan Ambrose Hart (1906–1980), American mountain man
- Sylvan Kalib (1929–2025), American music theorist
- Sylvan Levin (1903–1996), American pianist
- Sylvan Muldoon (1903–1969), American esotericist
- Sylvan Richardson (born 1965), British guitarist
- Sylvan Shemitz (1925–2007), American lighting designer
- Sylvan Wittwer (1917–2012), American agronomist

== Surname ==
- Kaj Sylvan (1923–2020), Danish sprint canoer who competed in the late 1950s
- Per Sylvan (1875–1945), Swedish Army lieutenant general
- Richard Sylvan (1935–1996), Australian logician and environmentalist also known as Richard Routley
- Sanford Sylvan (1953–2019), American operatic baritone
- Torsten Sylvan (1895–1970), Swedish equestrian who competed in the 1924 Summer Olympics

== See also ==
- S. Sylvan Simon (1910–1951), American stage/film director and producer
- Sylvain, a list of people with the given name
