= Silvanus lewisi =

Scientific classification
- Kingdom: Animalia
- Phylum: Arthropoda
- Class: Insecta
- Order: Coleoptera
- Suborder: Polyphaga
- Infraorder: Cucujiformia
- Family: Silvanidae
- Genus: Silvanus
- Species: S. lewisi

Binomial name
- Silvanus lewisi Reitter, 1876

Species of beetle

Silvanus lewisi, sometimes known as Asian silvanid beetle, is a species of silvan flat bark beetle found throughout the Oriental region and introduced to many parts of the world.

== Distribution ==
Found throughout the Afro-Oriental tropics, including Congo, Ghana, India, Sri Lanka, China, Vietnam, Taiwan, Japan, Malaysia, Singapore, Java, and Borneo. It also found in Oceanian islands such as the Solomon Islands, the Philippines, and Australia. Meanwhile, it has been introduced to the Western world and can be found in Great Britain and the United States.

== Description ==
The average length is about 2.07–2.50 mm. The body is dull yellow-brown in color and covered with short, semi-erect, golden pubescence. The head is broader than it is long, and the width across the eyes is less than the width of the pronotum across anterior angles. The eyes are extremely large and prominent, but the temples are very small (shorter than an eye facet). The antennae have segments 1–6 slightly more elongate. The prothorax is convex and elongated. The anterior angles of the pronotum are produced into spines about half as long as the eyes. The vertex of the head and the pronotum are covered in coarse and dense punctures. The scutellum is moderately large, transverse and pubescent. The elytra are about twice as long as broad and widest near the middle.

== Biology ==
The adults are observed from various stored food products and dunnage. At light, they hide under bark of tree stumps. Adults are found from desiccated coconut from Sri Lanka and found on tapioca flour from Thailand as well as on rice and pulses from Myanmar. In African records, they have found from the residues of bark and gum arabic, freshly fallen coconut palms in Ghana, Nigerian groundnut kernels and red beans from Mombasa.

Recorded plant species include: Shorea robusta, Bombax, Sterculia campanulata, Terminalia bialata, Cocos nucifera.
