= Acanthophila silvestrella =

Scientific classification
- Kingdom: Animalia
- Phylum: Arthropoda
- Class: Insecta
- Order: Lepidoptera
- Family: Gelechiidae
- Genus: Acanthophila
- Species: A. silvestrella

Binomial name
- Acanthophila silvestrella Ponomarenko, 1998

Species of moth

Acanthophila silvestrella is a moth in the family Gelechiidae. It is found in the Russian Far East, where it is known from the southern part of Primorsky Krai, and in China.

The wingspan is 11–12 mm.
