= Silvanus imitatus =

Scientific classification
- Kingdom: Animalia
- Phylum: Arthropoda
- Class: Insecta
- Order: Coleoptera
- Suborder: Polyphaga
- Infraorder: Cucujiformia
- Family: Silvanidae
- Genus: Silvanus
- Species: S. imitatus

Binomial name
- Silvanus imitatus Pal and Sengupta, 1977

Species of beetle

Silvanus imitatus is a species of silvan flat bark beetle found in India and Sri Lanka.

== Description ==
Average length is about 2.41 mm.
