= Chimp (disambiguation) =

Chimp or chimpanzee is a species of great ape native to the forests and savannas of tropical Africa.

Chimp(s) or The Chimp may also refer to:

- The Chimp (1932 film), a Laurel and Hardy short film
- Chimps: So Like Us, a 1980 documentary film
- The Chimp (2001 film), a Kyrgyz film
- Chimps Inc., an animal sanctuary in Oregon, United States
- C.H.I.M.P.S., a game mode in Bloons Tower Defense 6

== See also ==
- or
- or
- Chimpanzee (disambiguation)
