= Johann Lorenz von Mosheim =

German church historian (1693–1755)

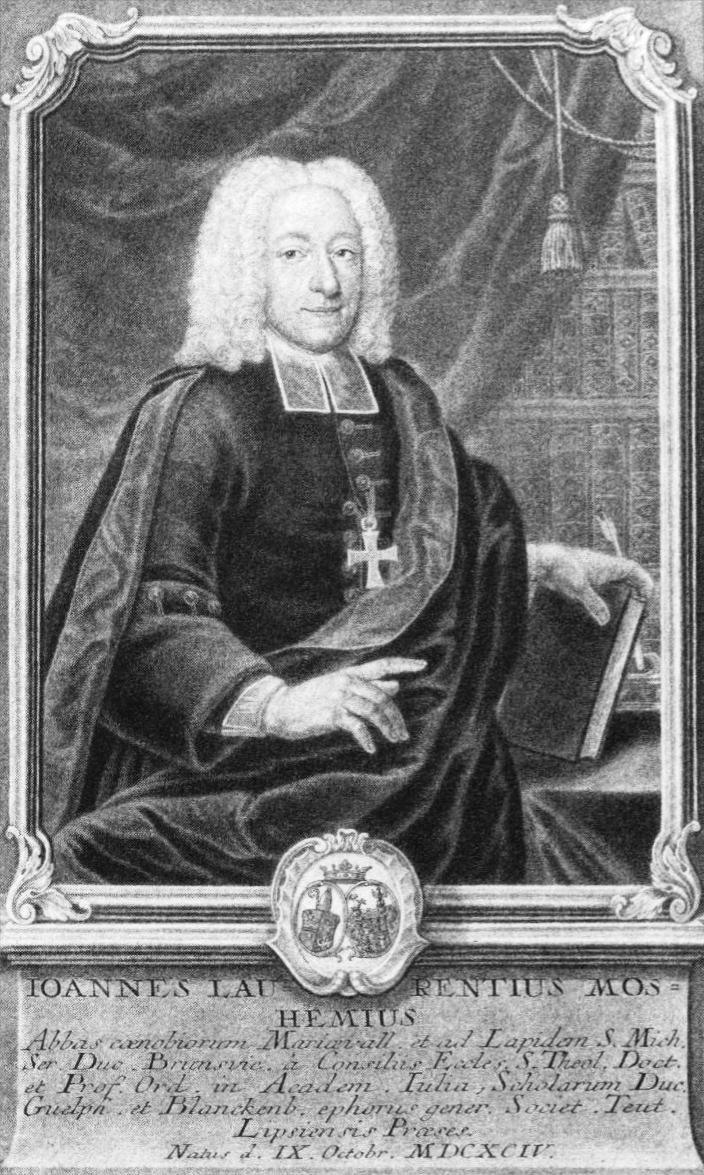
Johann Lorenz von Mosheim

Johann Lorenz von Mosheim or Johann Lorenz Mosheim (9 October 1693 – 9 September 1755) was a German Lutheran church historian.

== Biography ==
Mosheim was born at Lübeck on 9 October 1693 or 1694. After studying at the gymnasium of Lübeck, he entered the University of Kiel (1716), where he took his master's degree in 1718. In 1719 he became assessor in the philosophical faculty at Kiel.

His first appearance in the field of literature was in a polemical tract against John Toland, Vindiciae antiquae christianorum disciplinae (1720), which was soon followed by a volume of Observationes sacrae (1721). These works, along with the reputation he had acquired as a lecturer and preacher, secured for him a call to the University of Helmstedt as professor ordinarius in 1723. The Institutiones Historiae Ecclesiasticae Novi Testamenti appeared in 1726, and in the same year he was appointed by the duke of Brunswick abbot of Marienthal, to which dignity and emolument the abbacy of Michaelstein was added in the following year.

Mosheim was much consulted by the authorities when the new University of Göttingen was being formed, especially in the framing of the statutes of the theological faculty, and the provisions in the process of making the theologians independent of the ecclesiastical courts. In 1747 he was made chancellor of the university. In 1748 he was responsible for the visit made by George II of Great Britain to his university. He died at Göttingen on 9 September 1755.

== Works ==
Among his other works were De rebus christianorum ante Constantinum commentarii (1753), Ketzer-Geschichte (2nd edition 1748), and Sittenlehre der heiligen Schrift (1737). His exegetical writings, characterized by learning and good sense, include Cogitationes in N. T. bc. select. (1726), and expositions of I Corinthians (1741) and the two Epistles to Timothy (1755). In his sermons (Heilige Reden) considerable eloquence is shown, and a mastery of style which justifies the position he held as president of the German Society.

There are two English versions of the Institutes, that of the Revd. Archibald Maclaine, published in 1765, and that of James Murdock (1832), which is the more correct. Murdock's translation was revised and re-edited by James Seaton Reid in 1848, and by H. L. Hastings in 1892 (Boston). An English translation of the De rebus christianorum was published by Murdock in 1851. Maclaine's translation, the Institutes were retitled An Ecclesiastical History: Ancient and Modern, from the Birth of Christ to the Beginning of the Eighteenth Century: in which The Rise, Progress And Variation of Church Power Are Considered In Their Connection With the State Of Learning And Philosophy, and The Political History of Europe During that Period, and Mosheim's name was Anglicized as "John Lawrence Mosheim, D.D., Chancellor of the University of Göttingen.”

His Ecclesiastical History provided a crucial source for Edward Gibbon's Decline and Fall of the Roman Empire, and Gibbon borrowed many of Mosheim's arguments.

== See also ==
- Great Apostasy
- Giulio Lorenzo Selvaggio
- Town of Mosheim, Tennessee
