= Acanthophila lucistrialella =

Scientific classification
- Kingdom: Animalia
- Phylum: Arthropoda
- Class: Insecta
- Order: Lepidoptera
- Family: Gelechiidae
- Genus: Acanthophila
- Species: A. lucistrialella

Binomial name
- Acanthophila lucistrialella Ponomarenko & Omelko, 2003

Synonyms
- Dichomeris lucistrialella (Ponomarenko & Omelko, 2003)

Species of moth

Acanthophila lucistrialella is a moth in the family Gelechiidae. It is found in the Russian Far East, where it is known only from the southern part of Primorsky Krai.

== Description ==
The wingspan is 11–12 mm. The forewings are dark grey with only a light grey costal stroke at three-fourths of the wing length. The hindwings are dark grey.
