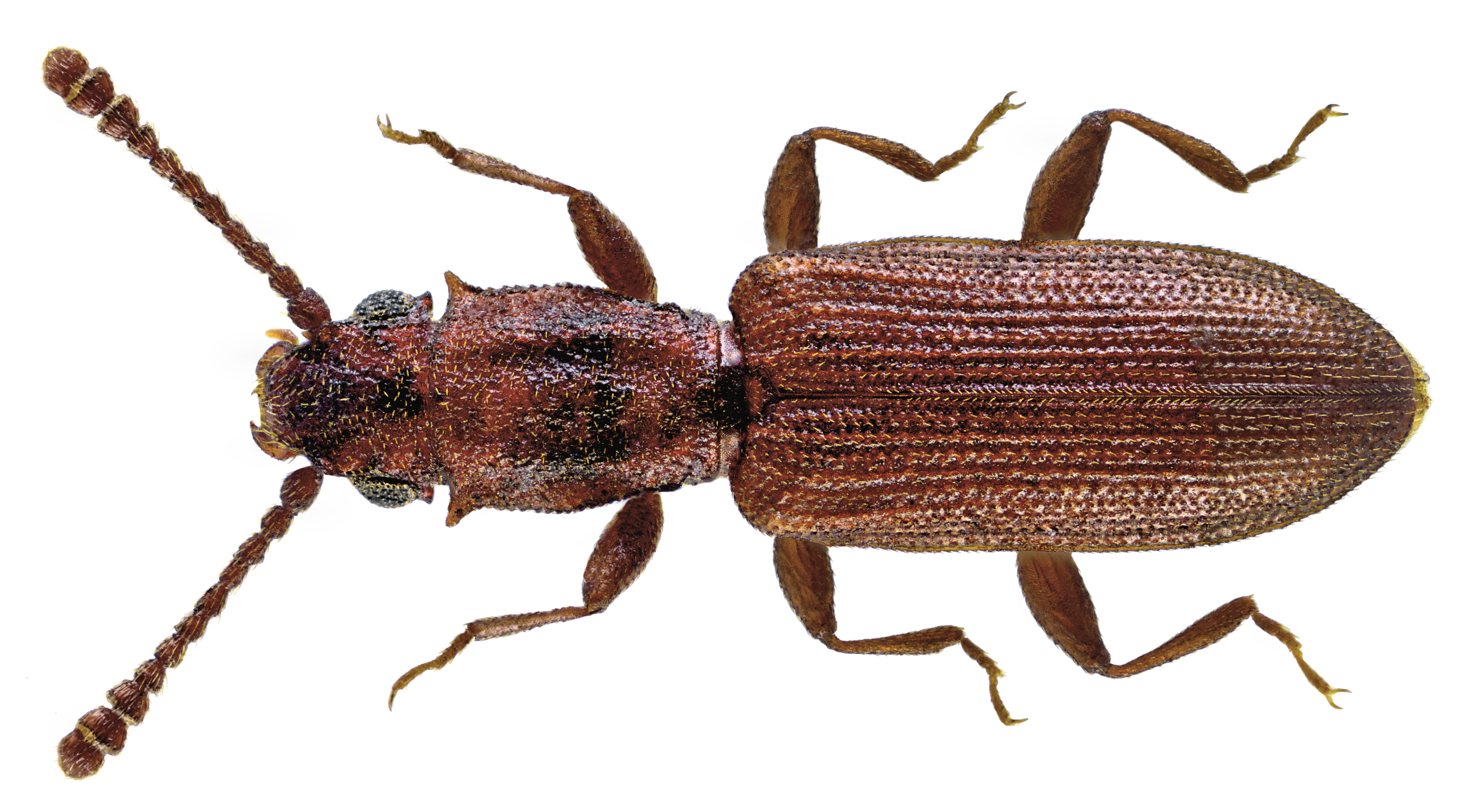

Scientific classification
- Kingdom: Animalia
- Phylum: Arthropoda
- Clade: Pancrustacea
- Class: Insecta
- Order: Coleoptera
- Suborder: Polyphaga
- Infraorder: Cucujiformia
- Family: Silvanidae
- Genus: Silvanus
- Species: S. bidentatus

Binomial name
- Silvanus bidentatus (Fabricius, 1792)

Synonyms
- Colydium sulcatum Fabricius, 1792; Dermestes bidentatus Fabricius, 1792; Silvanus affinis Reitter, 1876; Silvanus sulcatus (Fabricius, 1792)

= Silvanus bidentatus =

Species of beetle

Silvanus bidentatus, known generally as the flat bark beetle or two-toothed grain beetle, is a species of silvanid flat bark beetle in the family Silvanidae. It is found in North America, Oceania, and Europe.
