= Silvanus inarmatus =

Scientific classification
- Domain: Eukaryota
- Kingdom: Animalia
- Phylum: Arthropoda
- Class: Insecta
- Order: Coleoptera
- Suborder: Polyphaga
- Infraorder: Cucujiformia
- Family: Silvanidae
- Genus: Silvanus
- Species: S. inarmatus

Binomial name
- Silvanus inarmatus Wollaston, 1867

Species of beetle

Silvanus inarmatus is a species of beetles of the family Silvanidae. It occurs in Sub-Saharan Africa, Madagascar, Seychelles and Cape Verde. It is probably an introduced species in Cape Verde. The species was described by Thomas Vernon Wollaston in 1867.
