= Acanthophila imperviella =

Scientific classification
- Kingdom: Animalia
- Phylum: Arthropoda
- Class: Insecta
- Order: Lepidoptera
- Family: Gelechiidae
- Genus: Acanthophila
- Species: A. imperviella

Binomial name
- Acanthophila imperviella Ponomarenko & Omelko, 2003

Species of moth

Acanthophila imperviella is a moth in the family Gelechiidae. It is found in Russian Far East, where it is known only from the southern part of Primorsky Krai.

The wingspan is about 12 mm.
