= USS Sylvania (AKA-44) =

Cargo ship of the United States Navy

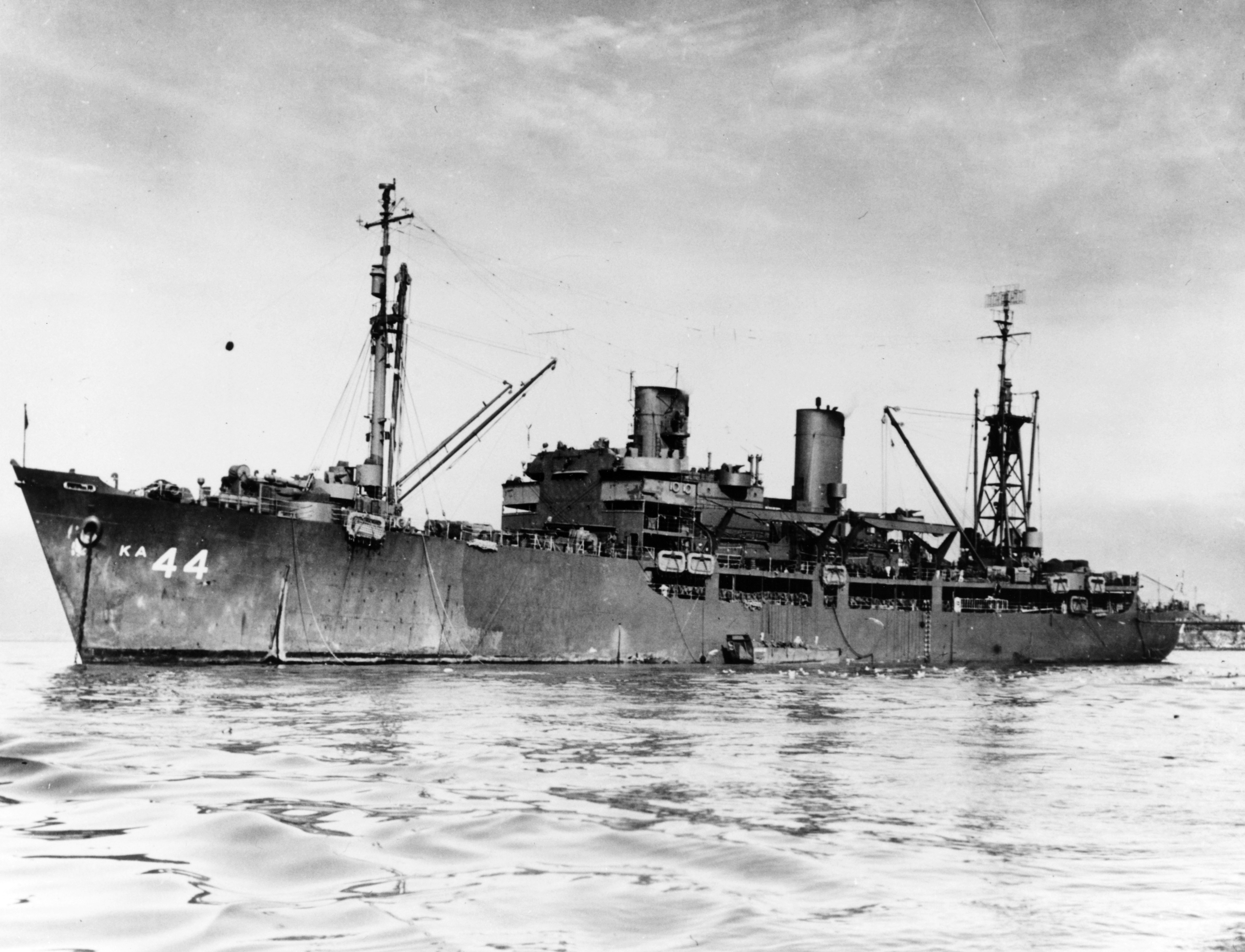

History

United States
- Name: USS Sylvania
- Namesake: The asteroid Sylvania
- Builder: Walsh-Kaiser Company, Providence, Rhode Island
- Laid down: 24 February 1945
- Launched: 25 April 1945
- Commissioned: 19 May 1945
- Decommissioned: 17 December 1946
- Stricken: 7 February 1947
- Fate: Scrapped, 1964

General characteristics
- Class & type: Artemis-class attack cargo ship
- Type: S4–SE2–BE1
- Displacement: 4,087 long tons (4,153 t) light; 7,080 long tons (7,194 t) full
- Length: 426 ft (130 m)
- Beam: 58 ft (18 m)
- Draft: 16 ft (4.9 m)
- Speed: 17 knots (31 km/h; 20 mph)
- Complement: 303 officers and enlisted
- Armament: 1 × 5"/38 caliber gun mount; 4 × twin 40 mm gun mounts; 10 × 20 mm gun mounts

USS Sylvania (AKA-44) was an Artemis-class attack cargo ship in service with the United States Navy from 1945 to 1946. She was scrapped in 1964.

== History ==
Sylvania (AKA-44) was named after the minor planet 519 Sylvania, which in turn is a word for forests. She was laid down on 24 February 1945 by the Walsh-Kaiser Co., Inc., Providence, R.I.; launched on 25 April 1945; sponsored by Miss Mary H. O'Neil; delivered to the Navy and commissioned on 19 May 1945.

Sylvania completed fitting out and loading at Boston and sailed for Norfolk on 4 June to begin her shakedown training. Training was completed on 15 June; and, six days later, the ship got underway for Marseille, France. She arrived there on 3 July and, nine days later, was underway for the Philippine Islands. The Panama Canal was transited on 27 July; and, after a port call at Eniwetok, Marshall Islands, the transport arrived at Manila on 26 August. The cargo and troops from France were off-loaded; and, until 19 September, vehicles, cargo, and troops were loaded which were destined for Japan.

Sylvania and other ships of Transport Squadron 14 sortied from Manila on 20 September en route to Japan. She arrived at Wakayama, Honshu, on 25 September, unloaded, and began the return voyage to the Philippines the next day. The cargo ship arrived at Subic Bay on 1 October and operated in the Philippines until 15 October when she sailed for Mitsugahama, Shikoku Island, Japan. She arrived there on the 21st and remained for a week prior to departing for Saipan, Mariana Islands.

Sylvania arrived at Saipan on the last day of October and was assigned duty with the "Magic Carpet" fleet. She embarked 325 passengers on 1 November and sailed for California. She arrived at San Francisco on 14 November; discharged her passengers; and sailed for Samar, P.I., two weeks later. Her sailing orders were modified en route, and she was directed to proceed to Saipan. She remained at Saipan from 13 to 15 December when she stood out for California, arriving at Los Angeles on 30 December 1945.

Sylvania sailed for Bikini, Marshall Islands, on 19 February 1946 to participate in "Operation Crossroads" the first post war atomic bomb tests, and operated between there and Pearl Harbor until 21 September when she returned to San Francisco. She moved up the coast to Seattle on 3 October and then to Bremerton, Washington, and the Navy Yard Puget Sound there.

USS Sylvania (AKA-44) was decommissioned at Bremerton on 17 December 1946 and struck from the Navy list on 7 February 1947. She was sold for scrap in 1964.
