= Selvaggio =

Selvaggio is a surname. Notable people with the surname include:

- Antonio Selvaggio (born 1958), Italian long-distance runner
- Giulio Lorenzo Selvaggio (1728–1772), Italian canonist and archaeologist
- Piero Selvaggio (born 1958), Italian long-distance runner

It may also refer to:

- Il Selvaggio, discontinued Italian magazine (1924–1943)
