= Silvain =

Silvain may refer to:

- Silvain (opera), an opera by André Ernest Modeste Grétry
- Silvain of Ahun, French martyr and saint
- 15899 Silvain, an asteroid

== People with the surname ==
- Eugène Silvain (1851–1930), French actor
- Pierre Silvain (1926–2009), French writer and playwright

== Ships ==
- FV Silvain, a Dutch fishing trawler in service 1904–16

== See also ==
- Saint-Silvain-Montaigut
- Saint-Silvain-Bellegarde
- Saint-Silvain-sous-Toulx
- Saint-Silvain-Bas-le-Roc
- Sylvain (disambiguation)
