= Acanthophila angustiptera =

Scientific classification
- Kingdom: Animalia
- Phylum: Arthropoda
- Class: Insecta
- Order: Lepidoptera
- Family: Gelechiidae
- Genus: Acanthophila
- Species: A. angustiptera

Binomial name
- Acanthophila angustiptera (Li & Zheng, 1997)

Synonyms
- Dichomeris angustiptera Li & Zheng, 1997

Species of moth

Acanthophila angustiptera is a moth in the family Gelechiidae. It is found in Shaanxi, China.
