= Silvanus planatus =

Scientific classification
- Domain: Eukaryota
- Kingdom: Animalia
- Phylum: Arthropoda
- Class: Insecta
- Order: Coleoptera
- Suborder: Polyphaga
- Infraorder: Cucujiformia
- Family: Silvanidae
- Genus: Silvanus
- Species: S. planatus

Binomial name
- Silvanus planatus Germar, 1824

Synonyms
- Silvanus cognatus Guérin-Méneville, 1844; Silvanus zimmermanni LeConte, 1854

Species of beetle

Silvanus planatus is a species of silvanid flat bark beetle in the family Silvanidae. It is found in North America and Oceania.
