= Acanthophila vixidistinctella =

Scientific classification
- Kingdom: Animalia
- Phylum: Arthropoda
- Class: Insecta
- Order: Lepidoptera
- Family: Gelechiidae
- Genus: Acanthophila
- Species: A. vixidistinctella

Binomial name
- Acanthophila vixidistinctella Ponomarenko & Omelko, 2003

Synonyms
- Dichomeris vixidistinctella (Ponomarenko & Omelko, 2003)

Species of moth

Acanthophila vixidistinctella is a moth in the family Gelechiidae. It is found in the Russian Far East, where it is known only from the southern part of Primorsky Krai.

== Description ==
The wingspan is 8–10.5 mm. The wings are dark grey.
