= Silvana =

Silvana or Sylvana, meaning "one who lives in the forest" in Latin, is a female given name. Her name day is celebrated on November 4th. Notable people with the name include:

- Silvana Arbia (born 1952), Italian judge and prosecutor
- Silvana Arias (born 1982), Peruvian actress
- Silvana Armenulić (1938–1976), Yugoslav singer and songwriter
- Silvana De Mari (born 1953), Italian writer, psychotherapist, and doctor
- Silvana Franco (born 1968), British chef
- Silvana Gallardo (1953–2012), American actress
- Silvana Ibarra (born 1959), Ecuadorian singer, actress, and politician
- Silvana Imam (born 1986), Swedish rapper of Lithuanian origin
- Silvana Jachino (1916–2004), Italian actress
- Silvana Koch-Mehrin (born 1970), German politician
- Silvana Mangano (1930–1989), Italian actress
- Silvana Pampanini (1925–2016), Italian actress
- Silvana Paternostro, Colombian journalist
- Silvana Santaella (born 1983), Venezuelan beauty pageant
- Silvana Sciarra (born 1948), Italian judge
- Silvana Suárez (1958–2022), Argentinian beauty pageant
- Silvana Tenreyro, British-Argentine economist
- Silvana Tirinzoni (born 1979), Swiss curler
- Sylvana Tomaselli (born 1957), Canadian historian and Countess of St Andrews
- Sylvana Foa (born 1945), American journalist and spokesperson
- Sylvana Gómez, Guatemalan beach volleyball player
- Sylvana Simons (born 1971), Dutch politician and former actress and TV presenter

== See also ==
- Silvina, a given name
- Sylvania (disambiguation)
