= Acanthophila nyingchiensis =

Scientific classification
- Kingdom: Animalia
- Phylum: Arthropoda
- Class: Insecta
- Order: Lepidoptera
- Family: Gelechiidae
- Genus: Acanthophila
- Species: A. nyingchiensis

Binomial name
- Acanthophila nyingchiensis (Li & Zheng, 1996)

Synonyms
- Dichomeris nyingchiensis Li & Zheng, 1996

Species of moth

Acanthophila nyingchiensis is a moth in the family Gelechiidae. It is found in Tibet, China.
