= USS Sylvania =

USS Sylvania has been the name of two ships in the service of the United States Navy.

- USS Sylvania (AKA-44), an Artemis-class attack cargo ship, which served from 1945 until 1946.
- USS Sylvania (AFS-2), a Mars-class combat stores ship, which served from 1964 until 1994.
