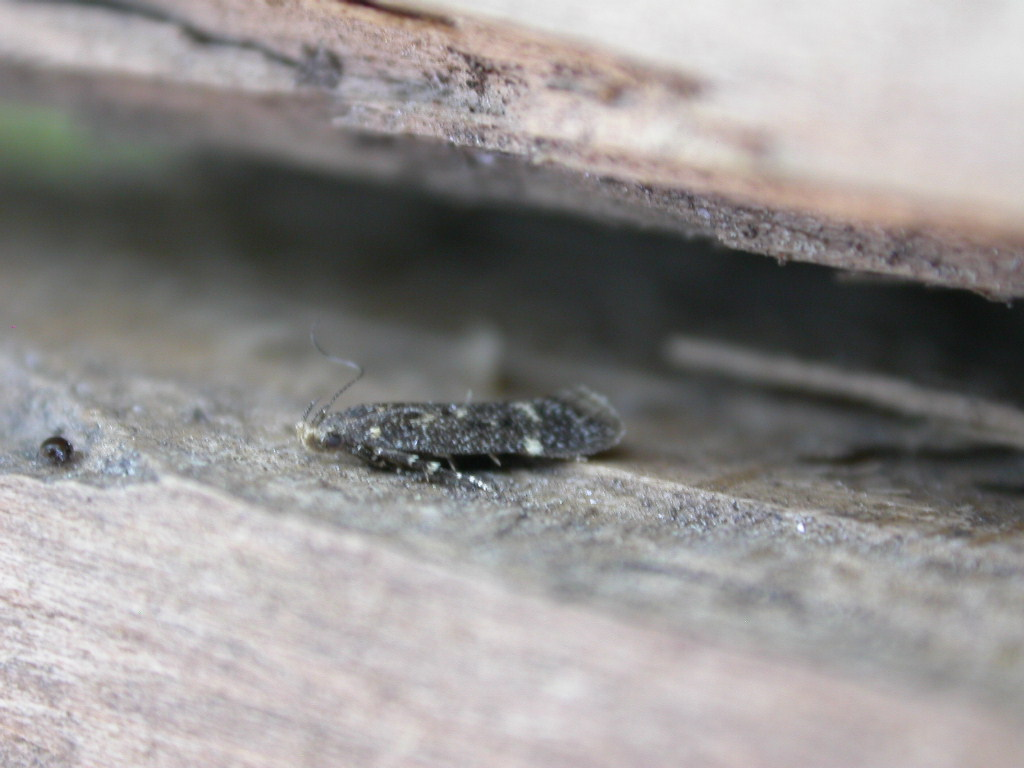

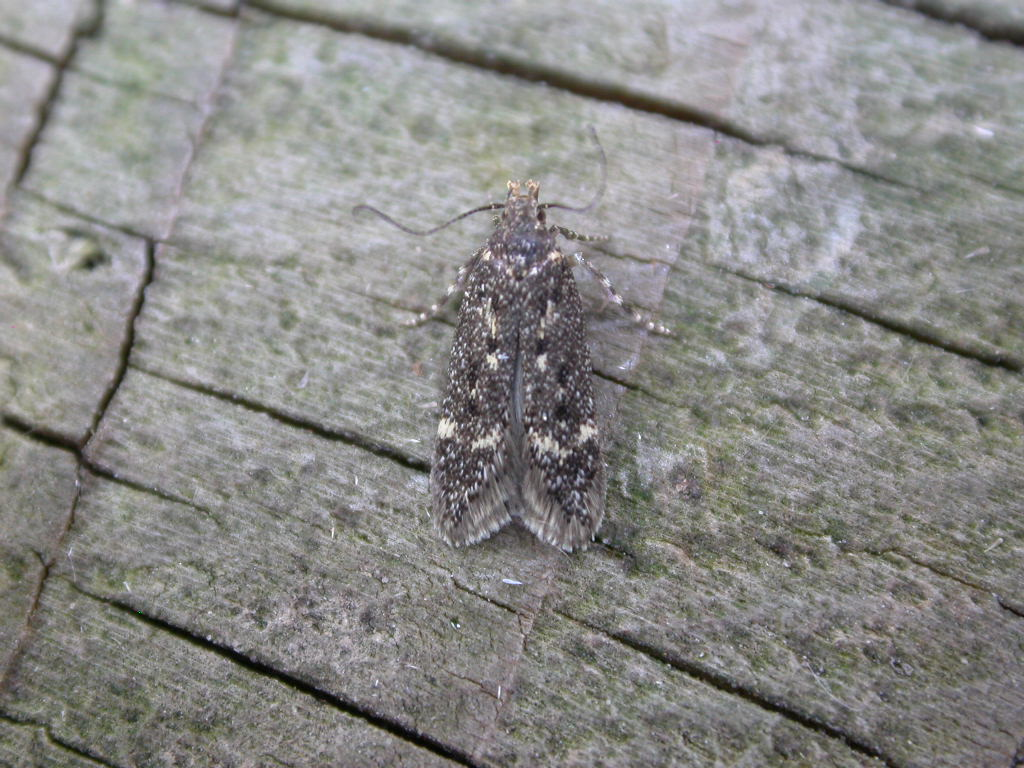

Scientific classification
- Domain: Eukaryota
- Kingdom: Animalia
- Phylum: Arthropoda
- Class: Insecta
- Order: Lepidoptera
- Family: Gelechiidae
- Genus: Acanthophila
- Species: A. alacella

Binomial name
- Acanthophila alacella (Zeller, 1839)

Synonyms
- Gelechia alacella Zeller, 1839; Dichomeris alacella (Zeller, 1839)

= Acanthophila alacella =

Species of moth

Acanthophila alacella is a moth of the family Gelechiidae. It is known from most of Europe, the northern Caucasus, Georgia and Iran.

The wingspan is about 14 mm (0.55 in). Adults are on wing from July to August. The larvae feed on lichens on tree-trunks.

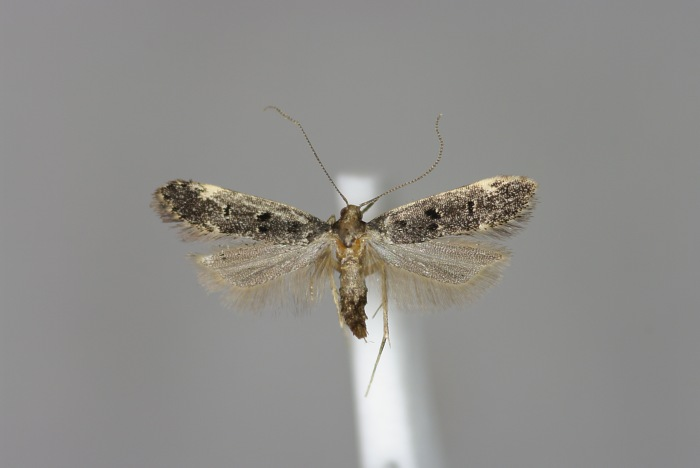
