= Silvanus nitidulus =

Scientific classification
- Domain: Eukaryota
- Kingdom: Animalia
- Phylum: Arthropoda
- Class: Insecta
- Order: Coleoptera
- Suborder: Polyphaga
- Infraorder: Cucujiformia
- Family: Silvanidae
- Genus: Silvanus
- Species: S. nitidulus

Binomial name
- Silvanus nitidulus LeConte, 1854

Species of beetle

Silvanus nitidulus is a species of silvanid flat bark beetle in the family Silvanidae. It is found in North America.
