= Acanthophila obscura =

Scientific classification
- Kingdom: Animalia
- Phylum: Arthropoda
- Class: Insecta
- Order: Lepidoptera
- Family: Gelechiidae
- Genus: Acanthophila
- Species: A. obscura

Binomial name
- Acanthophila obscura (Li & Zheng, 1997)

Synonyms
- Dichomeris obscura Li & Zheng, 1997

Species of moth

Acanthophila obscura is a moth in the family Gelechiidae. It is found in Shaanxi, China.
