= Acanthophila bimaculata =

Scientific classification
- Kingdom: Animalia
- Phylum: Arthropoda
- Class: Insecta
- Order: Lepidoptera
- Family: Gelechiidae
- Genus: Acanthophila
- Species: A. bimaculatus

Binomial name
- Acanthophila bimaculatus (Liu & Qian, 1994)

Synonyms
- Dichomeris bimaculatus Liu & Qian, 1994; Dichomeris bimaculata – Ponomarenko, 1997; Acanthophila bimaculata – Ponomarenko & Omelko, 2003

Species of moth

Acanthophila bimaculatus is a moth in the family Gelechiidae. It is widely distributed in southwestern to eastern China (Sichuan, Guangxi, Guangdong, Guizhou, Hunan, Hubei, Shaanxi, Henan, Jiangxi, Fujian, Anhui, Zhejiang).

The larvae feed on Cunninghamia lanceolata.
