= Silvanus difficilis =

Scientific classification
- Kingdom: Animalia
- Phylum: Arthropoda
- Class: Insecta
- Order: Coleoptera
- Suborder: Polyphaga
- Infraorder: Cucujiformia
- Family: Silvanidae
- Genus: Silvanus
- Species: S. difficilis

Binomial name
- Silvanus difficilis Halstead, 1973

Species of beetle

Silvanus difficilis is a species of silvan flat bark beetle widespread in Oriental region. It is introduced to Australia via timber and also to Costa Rica.

== Distribution ==
Many Oriental countries including, Malaya, India, Sri Lanka, Vietnam, Taiwan, Singapore, Sumatra, Java, Christmas Island, Sarawak, Borneo, Philippines, Moluccas, and New Guinea. Also found in Oceanian regions of Solomon Islands, Samoan Islands, and introduced to Australia. There are records from West Africa, Britain, New Ireland and Costa Rica.

== Description ==
Average length is about 2.17 to 2.64 mm. Prothorax convex, and elongated. Scutellum large, transverse and pubescent.

== Ecology ==
Adults have been collected from Shorea robusta in India. They have found among commodities imported to Britain from the Oriental region.
