= Acanthophila liui =

Scientific classification
- Domain: Eukaryota
- Kingdom: Animalia
- Phylum: Arthropoda
- Class: Insecta
- Order: Lepidoptera
- Family: Gelechiidae
- Genus: Acanthophila
- Species: A. liui

Binomial name
- Acanthophila liui (Li & Zheng, 1996)

Synonyms
- Dichomeris liui Li & Zheng, 1996

Species of moth

Acanthophila liui is a moth in the family Gelechiidae. It is found in China (Anhui, Jiangxi, Jilin) and in the Russian Far East (Primorsky Krai).
