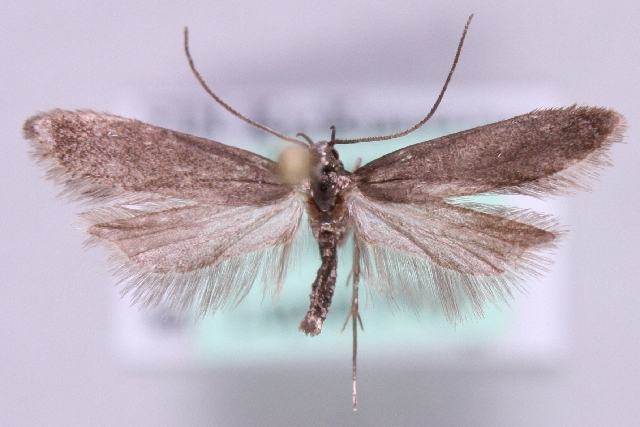

Scientific classification
- Kingdom: Animalia
- Phylum: Arthropoda
- Class: Insecta
- Order: Lepidoptera
- Family: Gelechiidae
- Genus: Acanthophila
- Species: A. latipennella

Binomial name
- Acanthophila latipennella (Rebel, 1937)

Synonyms
- Aristotelia (Xystophora) latipennella Rebel, 1937; Acompsia scotosiella Hackman, 1945; Acanthophila piceana Sulcs, 1968; Dichomeris (Mimomeris) steueri Povolný, 1978; Dichomeris latipennella Rebel, 1937

= Acanthophila latipennella =

Species of moth

Acanthophila latipennella is a moth in the family Gelechiidae. It is widely distributed in North, Central, and East Europe including Russia and is also known from the Russian Far East.

The wingspan is 11–13 mm (0.43–0.51 in). The larvae feed on Picea abies.
