= Silvanus recticollis =

Scientific classification
- Kingdom: Animalia
- Phylum: Arthropoda
- Class: Insecta
- Order: Coleoptera
- Suborder: Polyphaga
- Infraorder: Cucujiformia
- Family: Silvanidae
- Genus: Silvanus
- Species: S. recticollis

Binomial name
- Silvanus recticollis Reitter, 1876

Synonyms
- Leucohimatium breve Wollaston, 1873; Silvanus recticollis Reitter, 1876; Silvanus reflexus Reitter, 1880; Silvanus vitulus Grouvelle, 1882; Silvanus (Microsilvanus) vitulus Grouvelle; Grouvelle, 1912; Silvanus [Microsilvanus) pumilus Grouvelle, 1912; Silvanus (Microsilvanus) minimus Grouvelle, 1912

Species of beetle

Silvanus recticollis is a species of silvan flat bark beetle found in Afro-Oriental regions.

== Distribution ==
It is found in many Oriental countries such as India, Sri Lanka, Vietnam, Laos, Sulawesi, Japan, Thailand, and Iriomote Islands. In African region, it is found in Ethiopia, Mauritania, Congo, Zaire, and Zimbabwe. In 2019, the species was recorded from Poland for the first time. It is also found in the Sardinia island of Italy, and from Florida, USA.

== Description ==
It is a small, dull species with an average length of about 1.69 to 2.19 mm. The body is elongated, and moderately depressed. Dorsum is uniformly yellowish brown and covered with short, semi-erect, with golden pubescence. Head slightly broader than long. Vertex densely punctured with coarse punctures but clypeus is less densely punctured. Pronotum slightly longer than broad, appearing quadrate. Eyes small with long temple. Antenna moderately long and slender with large scape and short pedicel. Prothorax convex, slightly elongated and quadrate. Scutellum moderately large, transverse and pubescent.
