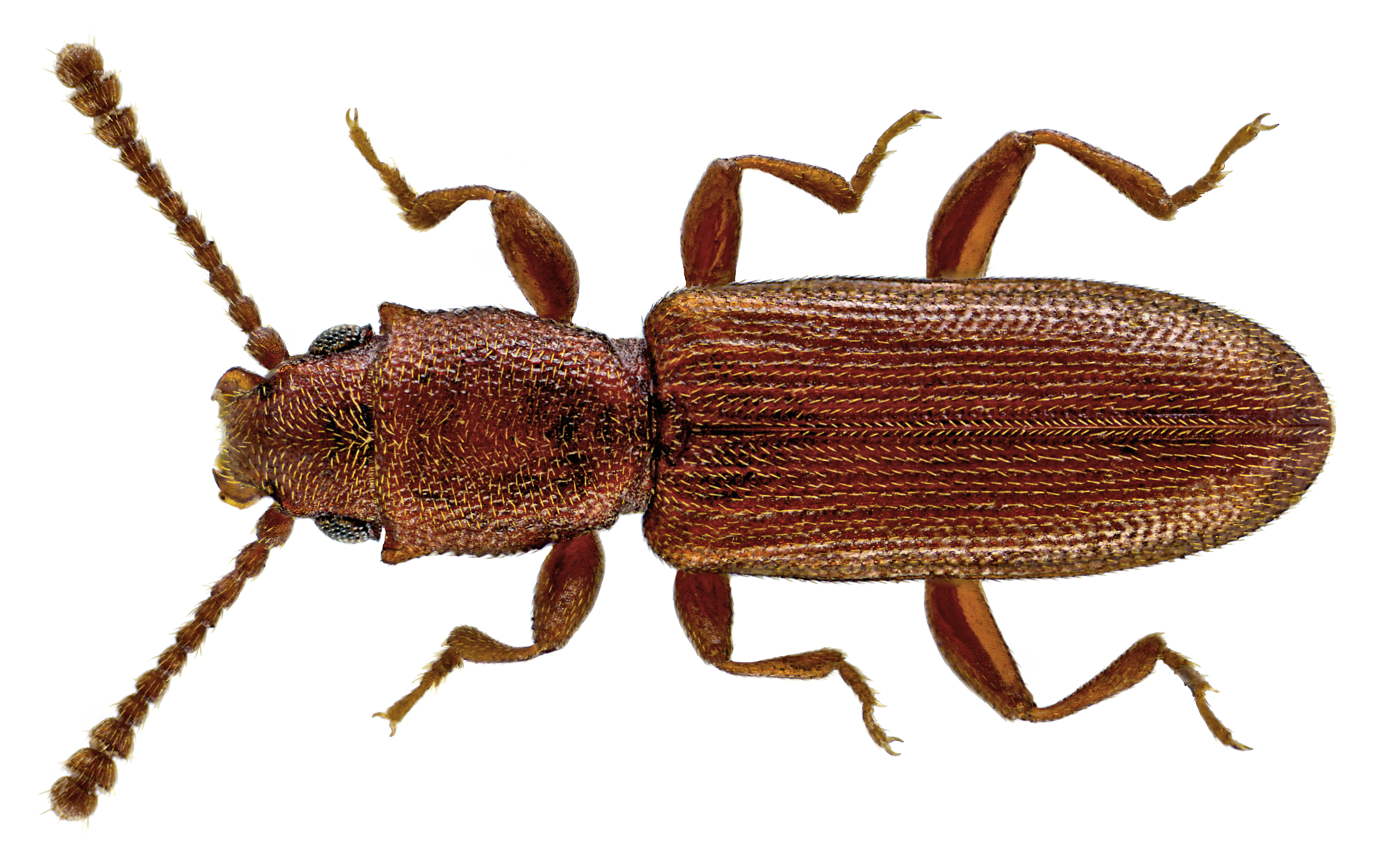

Scientific classification
- Kingdom: Animalia
- Phylum: Arthropoda
- Clade: Pancrustacea
- Class: Insecta
- Order: Coleoptera
- Suborder: Polyphaga
- Infraorder: Cucujiformia
- Family: Silvanidae
- Genus: Silvanus
- Species: S. unidentatus

Binomial name
- Silvanus unidentatus (Olivier, 1790)

Synonyms
- Ips unidentata Olivier, 1790; Silvanus gratiosus Motschulsky, 1863; Colydium planum Herbst, 1797; Silvanus siculus Stierlin, 1864

= Silvanus unidentatus =

Species of beetle

Silvanus unidentatus, is a species of silvanid flat bark beetle in the family Silvanidae. Native to Eurasia, it is established in North America and Chile.
