= Acanthophila qinlingensis =

Scientific classification
- Kingdom: Animalia
- Phylum: Arthropoda
- Class: Insecta
- Order: Lepidoptera
- Family: Gelechiidae
- Genus: Acanthophila
- Species: A. qinlingensis

Binomial name
- Acanthophila qinlingensis (Li & Zheng, 1996)

Synonyms
- Dichomeris qinlingensis Li & Zheng, 1996

Species of moth

Acanthophila qinlingensis is a moth in the family Gelechiidae. It is found in Shaanxi (China) and in the Russian Far East, where it is known from Primorsky Krai.

The wingspan is about 14 mm.
