= Silvanus =

Silvanus or Sylvanus may refer to:

- Silvanus (name), a given name, including a list of people, biblical figures and fictional characters with the name
- Silvanus (mythology), a Roman tutelary deity or spirit of woods and fields
- Sylvanus, Michigan, United States, a village
- Silvanus (beetle), a genus of beetles

== See also ==
- Teachings of Silvanus, a text from the Nag Hammadi library
- Silvain (disambiguation)
- Silvan (disambiguation)
- Sylvain (disambiguation)
