= Silvan Byggemarked =

Danish chain of hardware stores

Silvan A/S
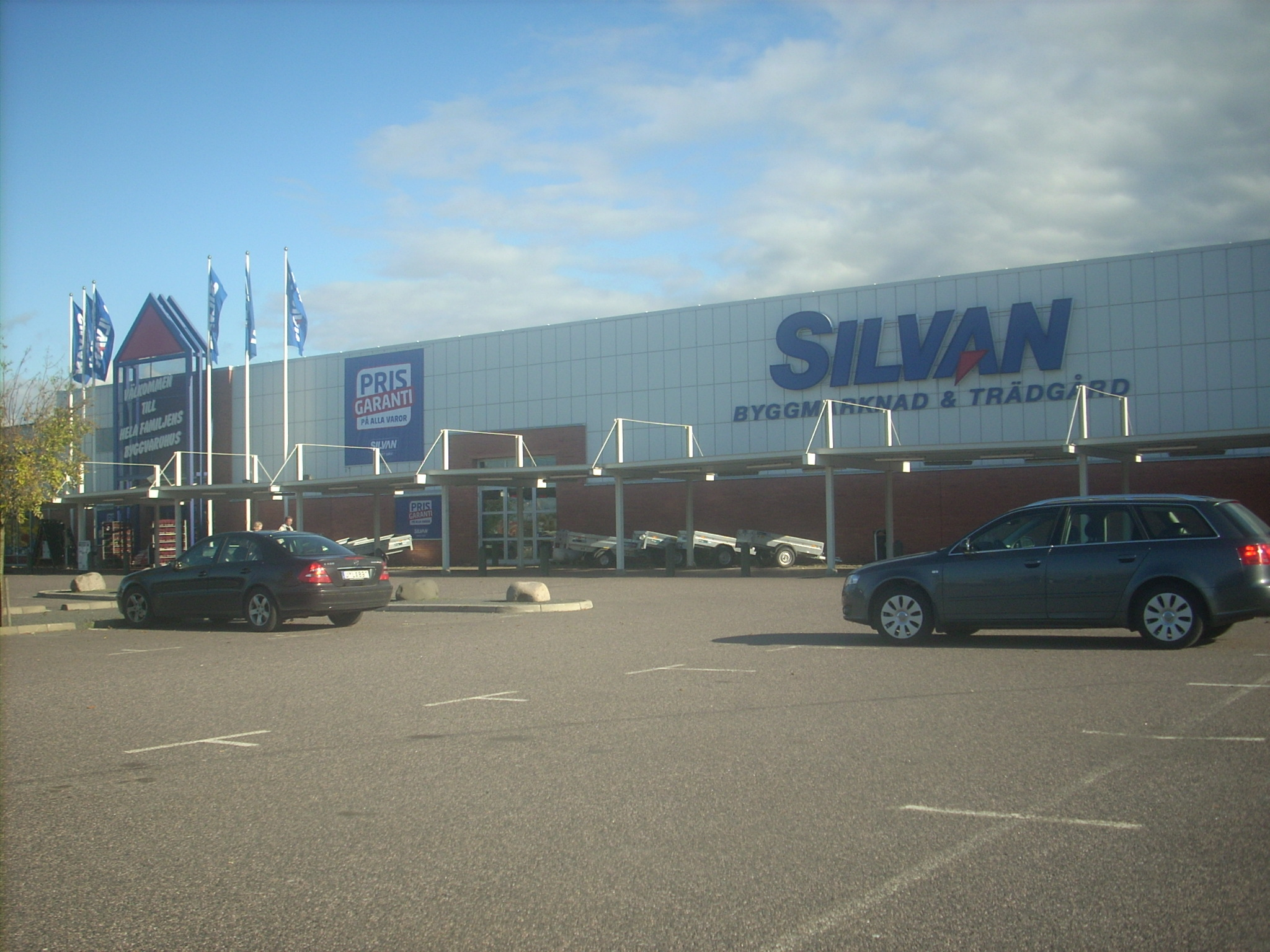
- Formation: 1874; 151 years ago
- Headquarters: Brabrand, Denmark
- Products: DIY building materials
- Fields: Hardware store
- Owner: Aurelius Group
- Website: silvan.dk

Silvan A/S is a Danish chain of hardware stores established in 1874. It is one of the largest retailers of DIY building materials in Denmark, and they primarily sell to nonprofessionals but also to professional tradesmen. The name, Silvan, comes from the Latin word for forest, silva.

Silvan has 42 DIY stores situated near larger cities around Denmark. The average size of the stores is 2,400 square metres excluding warehouse, administration, garden center, and drive-in. In addition to the 42 DIY stores, Silvan also has an online store with more than 22,000 articles. The day-to-day operations of Silvan A/S takes place in the head office in Brabrand near Aarhus where approximately 100 people are employed.

== History ==
Silvan was established back in 1874 when the grocers Johan Christian Strudsberg and Peter Thomsen established and opened the company for the first time under the name: Trælast- og Kulhandelen Silvan. In 1894 Silvan was registered as a partnership and in December 1900, the company was bought up and turned into a joint-stock company by industrialist Vilh. Lange, factory owner H. P. B. Kierulff, wholesaler C. J. Christensen and grocer Christian Lund. In 1913 the company changed its name to Akts. Trælasthandelen Silvan as the coal trade was sold to A/S Slagelse Kulkompagni. From then onwards, Trælasthandelen Silvan sold mainly timber and building materials. In 1968, Silvan opened the first store in Slagelse with an even broader product offering. Here customers could also buy hand tools, gardening equipment etc.

Together with Stark, Silvan has through the years been owned by Danske Trælast which in 2006 changed its name to DT Group. Danske Trælast was established back in 1896 under the name: Aarhus Trælasthandel. In 2007 DT Group chose to sell off Silvan which was bought the same year by the German investment firm Aurelius Group which is the current owner of Silvan. Aurelius currently has 20 portfolio companies located across Europe which employ around 15,000 people and generate annual revenues of more than EUR 3.5 billion. The shares of Aurelius Equity Opportunities are traded on all German stock exchanges.

Silvan has previously also had 11 hardware stores in Sweden. These were closed on May 31, 2009, where three of the stores in Malmö, Halmstad, and Gothenburg were acquired by Beijer Byggmaterial.
