= Giulio Lorenzo Selvaggio =

Italian canonist and archaeologist

Giulio Lorenzo Selvaggio (b. Naples, 10 August 1728; d. Naples, November, 1772) was a canonist and archaeologist.

== Biography ==
Giulio Lorenzo Selvaggio entered the seminary of Naples in 1744, and was ordained priest in 1752. He subsequently devoted himself to the study of history, philosophy, and the Semitic languages. He became censor of books and synodal examiner for the archdiocese of Naples, and wrote the notes for the Italian edition of the ecclesiastical history of the Lutheran historian, Johann Lorenz Mosheim. Appointed professor of canon law in 1764, he published Institutionum canonicarum libri tres (Padua, 1770) and conferences in civil law, interesting from the standpoint of contemporary Neapolitan law. Thomas Maria Mamachi's work on Christian antiquities being unfinished, Selvaggio resolved to deal with the same subject in a smaller work, but he died before finishing it. His friend, Canon Kalephati, continued the publication of the Antiquitatum ecclesiasticarum institutiones (6 vols., Naples, 1772-6), prefacing them with a biography of the author: Commentarius de vita et scriptis J. L. Selvagii.
