= Acanthophila silvania =

Scientific classification
- Kingdom: Animalia
- Phylum: Arthropoda
- Class: Insecta
- Order: Lepidoptera
- Family: Gelechiidae
- Genus: Acanthophila
- Species: A. silvania

Binomial name
- Acanthophila silvania Ponomarenko & Omelko, 2003

Species of moth

Acanthophila silvania is a moth in the family Gelechiidae. It is known from Primorsky Krai, the Russian Far East.

The wingspan is 11.5–12 mm.
