= Sylvania Township =

Sylvania Township may refer to the following places:

- Sylvania Township, Scott County, Missouri
- Sylvania Township, Lucas County, Ohio
- Sylvania Township, Pennsylvania

See also

- Sylvan Township (disambiguation)
