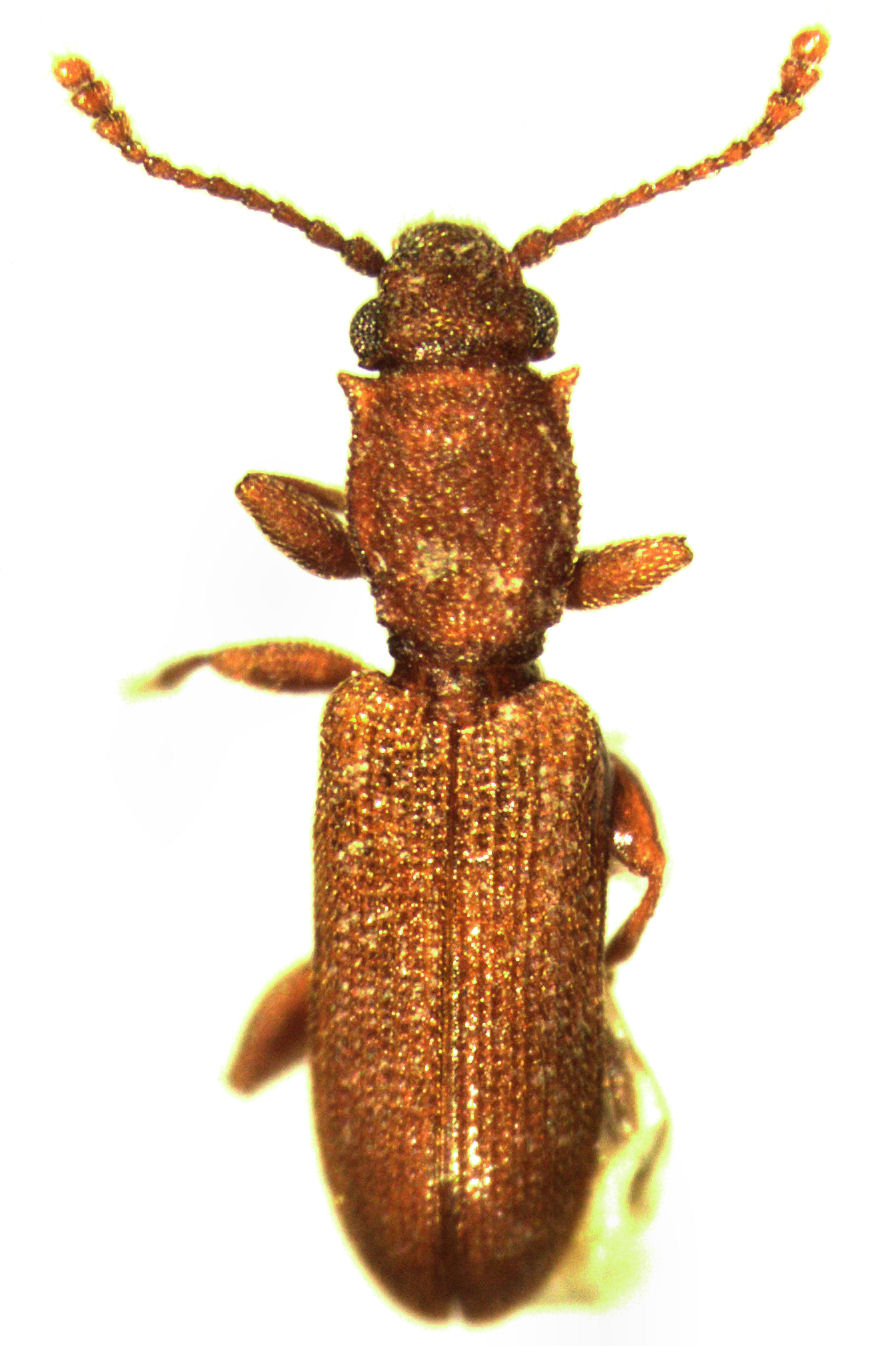
- Adult Silvanus lateritius, length about 2.7 mm

Scientific classification
- Domain: Eukaryota
- Kingdom: Animalia
- Phylum: Arthropoda
- Class: Insecta
- Order: Coleoptera
- Suborder: Polyphaga
- Infraorder: Cucujiformia
- Family: Silvanidae
- Subfamily: Silvaninae
- Genus: Silvanus; Latrielle, 1807

= Silvanus (beetle) =

Genus of beetles

Silvanus is a genus of beetles in the family Silvanidae, containing the following species:

- Silvanus bidentatus Fabricius
- Silvanus castaneus MacLeay
- Silvanus curvispinus Pal & Sen Gupta
- Silvanus difficilis Halstead
- Silvanus gibbus Pal & Sen Gupta
- Silvanus imitatus Pal & Sen Gupta
- Silvanus inarmatus Wollaston
- Silvanus lateritius Broun
- Silvanus lewisi Reitter
- Silvanus mediocris Grouvelle
- Silvanus muticus Sharp
- Silvanus nigrans Pal & Sen Gupta
- Silvanus nitidulus LeConte
- Silvanus planatus Germar
- Silvanus productus Halstead
- Silvanus proximus Grouvelle
- Silvanus recticollis Reitter
- Silvanus robustus Halstead
- Silvanus rossi Halstead
- Silvanus ruficorpus Pal & Sen Gupta
- Silvanus semus Halstead
- Silvanus unidentatus Olivier
