= Acanthophila kuznetzovi =

Scientific classification
- Kingdom: Animalia
- Phylum: Arthropoda
- Class: Insecta
- Order: Lepidoptera
- Family: Gelechiidae
- Genus: Acanthophila
- Species: A. kuznetzovi

Binomial name
- Acanthophila kuznetzovi Ponomarenko, 1998

Species of moth

Acanthophila kuznetzovi is a moth in the family Gelechiidae. It is known from the southern part of Primorsky Krai, the Russian Far East, and from Jilin, Northeast China.

== Description ==
The wingspan is 12–13 mm.

== Etymology ==
The species is named for Prof. V.I. Kuznetzov of the Zoological Institute in St. Petersburg.
