= Lake Sylvan (New Zealand) =

Lake on South Island, New Zealand

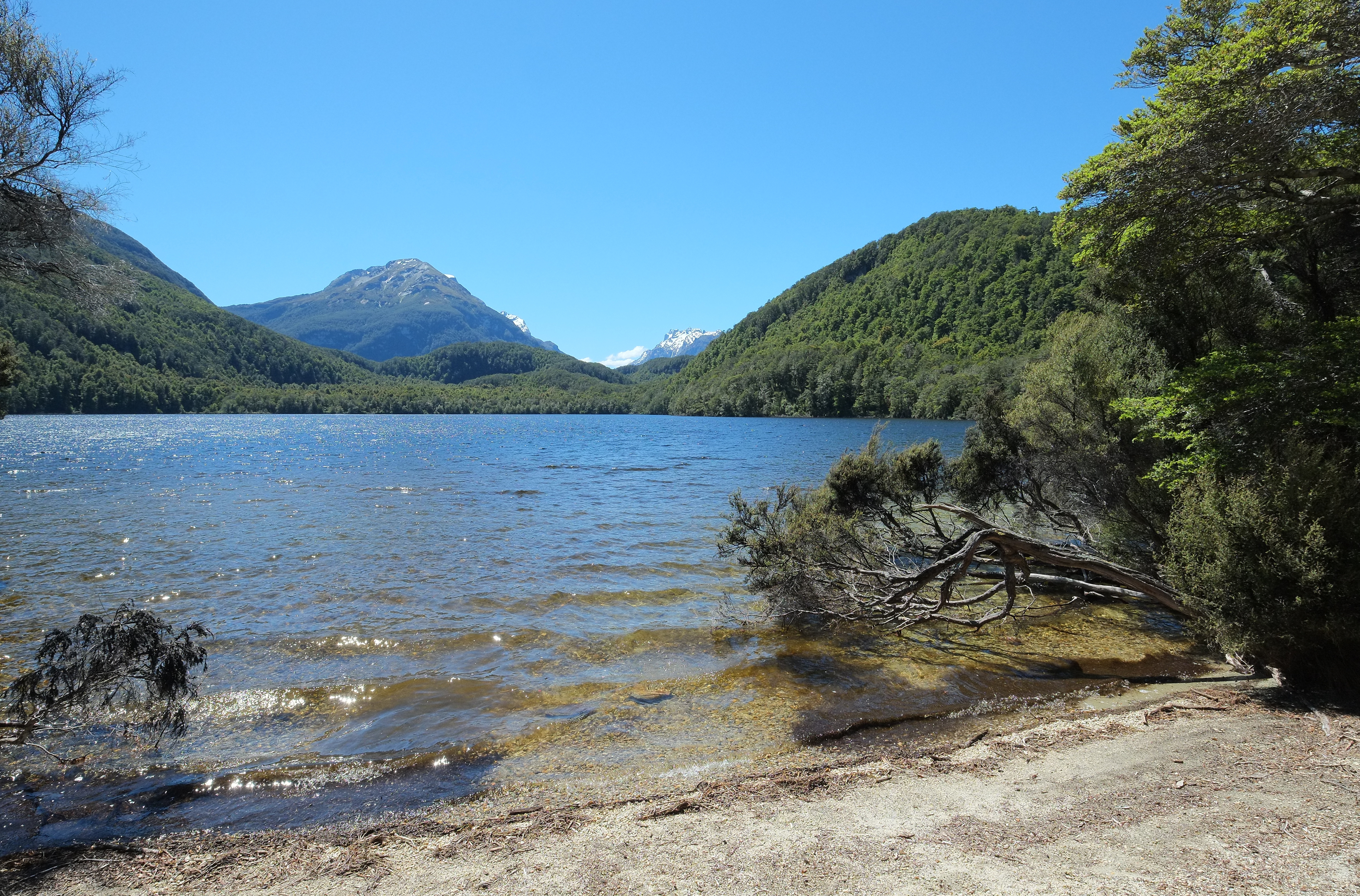
- Lake Sylan in spring

- Location within New Zealand
- Location: Otago, South Island
- Coordinates: 44.705°S 168.319722°E
- Basin countries: New Zealand
- Surface elevation: 370 m (1,210 ft)

Lake Sylvan is a small lake north of Lake Wakatipu in the South Island of New Zealand. It lies within the boundaries of the Mount Aspiring National Park near the Queenstown start of the Routeburn Track.

== Description ==
The lake is surrounded by native red beech forest and is fed by two small streams. Its outflow leads past a swampy area southeast of the lake and into Dart River.

A walking track leads from a Department of Conservation campsite, along the lower Route Burn to a viewing platform on the southern shore of the lake. The campsite at start of the Lake Sylvan Track has a parking area and can be accessed by a short gravel road off Routeburn Road.

== See also ==
- List of lakes in New Zealand
