= Pittsylvania =

Pittsylvania may refer to

- Pittsylvania County, Virginia, USA
- an early name for the proposed Vandalia (colony)

== See also ==
- Pittsburgh, Pennsylvania
- Pottsylvania
