= Silvania (band) =

- Origin: Lima, Peru
- Genres: Shoegaze, dream pop, ambient pop, experimental (later techno/electronica)
- Years active: 1989–2008 (as duo); 2008–present (Mario solo)
- Labels: Elefant Records; Click New Wave
- Members: Mario Silvania (Mario)
- Past members: Cocó Ciëlo (Jorge Luis Revilla; died 2008), Sylvia Lydia, Santiago

Silvania was a pioneering Peruvian musical project founded in 1989 by Mario Silvania (Mario) and Cocó Ciëlo (Cocó, real name Jorge Luis Revilla). The duo is widely regarded as one of the earliest practitioners of shoegaze and dream pop in Latin America, blending ambient textures, ethereal vocals, and influences from bands such as Cocteau Twins and My Bloody Valentine.

The project emerged from Peru's underground music scene before the duo relocated to Spain (initially to Valencia and later to Madrid), where they further developed their career and became key figures in the Spanish indie and alternative music landscape of the 1990s and early 2000s.

== History ==
Their debut album, Miel Nube Hiel, was released in 1992 on the Valencian label Experience Records. Silvania subsequently signed with the influential Spanish indie label Elefant Records, for whom they released the shoegaze LP En Cielo de Océano (1993), followed by Paisaje III (1994) and the single "Avalovara" (1995). Later works on the label include Naves Sin Puertos (1998) and Juniperfin.

By the late 1990s, Silvania began incorporating more electronic and techno elements into their sound, contributing to soundtracks, art installations (including work for the Venice Biennale), and remixes by artists such as Autechre and Scanner.

In the early 2000s, Mario and Cocó shifted their focus to a new pop-oriented project called Cielo (or Ciëlo), releasing material on their own label, Click New Wave, while reserving the Silvania name for ambient, soundtrack, and experimental works.

Tragically, Cocó Ciëlo was murdered in Madrid on September 29, 2008, at age 40, bringing the original duo's active collaboration to an end.

Since 2008, Mario Silvania has continued the project as a solo artist based in Lima, Peru, releasing ambient and soundtrack-oriented albums throughout the 2010s and 2020s, including Todos Los Astronautas Dicen Que Pasaron Por La Luna (2021), Banda Sonora para Cometas y Halos Lunares (2022), and Aeolian (2023).

== Legacy ==
Silvania is widely celebrated as a cult act and an early precursor to Latin American shoegaze and dream pop, influencing later generations of Peruvian and Spanish alternative musicians. The band has experienced renewed interest in the 2020s through digital reissues, availability on Bandcamp, and online appreciation within shoegaze communities.

== Discography ==
Studio Albums

- En Cielo de Océano (1993)
- Paisaje III (1994)
- Delay Tambor (1996)
- Juniperfin (1997)
- Naves Sin Puertos (1998)
- Campo De Espirales Arboles Secuencias Posibles (2006)

Singles & EPs

- Avalovara (single, 1995)
- Miel Nube Hiel (1992)
- Galax Trax (1996)
- Aero (1996)
- Suprematiz (1997)

Compilations

- Solineide Says 1991–1993 (compilation/reissue, 2003)
