= Silvestro =

Silvestro is both a surname and a masculine Italian given name. Notable people with the name include:

Surname:

- Alex Silvestro (born 1988), American football player
- Chris Silvestro (born 1979), Scottish footballer
- Jim Silvestro (born 1963), Australian rules footballer
- Milo Silvestro, Italian musician, and lead singer of American heavy metal band Fear Factory
- Alba De Silvestro (born 1995), Italian ski mountaineer
- René De Silvestro (born 1996), Italian para alpine skier

Given name:

- Silvestro Aldobrandini (1500–1558), Italian lawyer
- Silvestro de Buoni (died 1484), Italian Renaissance painter
- Silvestro Chiesa (died 1657), Italian Baroque painter
- Silvestro Durante (died 1672), Italian Baroque composer
- Silvestro Ganassi dal Fontego (born 1492), Italian musician
- Silvestro de' Gigli (died 1521), Italian Roman Catholic bishop
- Silvestro Lega (1826–1895), Italian painter
- Sylvestro "Pedro" Morales (18??–1???), Mexican bandit
- Silvestro Palma (1754–1834), Italian composer
- Silvestro Valiero (1630–1700), Doge of Venice
