= Sylvan Lake (Grant County, Minnesota) =

Lake in the state of Minnesota, United States

- Location within Minnesota
- Location: Grant County, Minnesota
- Coordinates: 45°55′33″N 95°46′56″W
- Type: lake

Sylvan Lake is a lake in Grant County, in the U.S. state of Minnesota.

Sylvan Lake was named for the greenery near its shores, Sylvan representing woodlands in mythology.

== See also ==
- List of lakes in Minnesota
