= Silvan Lake =

- Location within Georgia Location within the United States
- Location: Rabun County, Georgia
- Coordinates: 34.9256386°N 83.4200374°W
- Type: reservoir

Silvan Lake is a reservoir in the U.S. state of Georgia.

A variant spelling is "Sylvan Lake". The lake's name means "wood lake".
