= Saint-Sylvain =

Saint-Sylvain may refer to several communes in France:

- Saint Sylvain, Calvados, in the Calvados département
- Saint-Sylvain, Corrèze, in the Corrèze département
- Saint-Sylvain, Seine-Maritime, in the Seine-Maritime département
- Saint-Sylvain-d'Anjou, in the Maine-et-Loire département
