= Silvana (disambiguation) =

Silvana, also spelled Sylvana, is a female given name.

Silvana may also refer to:

== Arts and entertainment ==
- Silvana (opera), by Carl Maria von Weber
- Silvana (soundtrack), a soundtrack for the Mexican television series Cómplices Al Rescate
- Silvana, a battleship from the Japanese animated television series Last Exile

== Other uses ==
- Silvana (food), a Filipino cookie
- Silvana, Washington, United States, a rural community and census-designated place
- Silvana*HDC,a Dutch Warmblood show jumping mare
- SS Silvana, a merchant ship built in Scotland in 1944 as Empire Captain

== See also ==
- Silvaneh, Iran, a city
- Sylvanas Windrunner, a fictional character in the Warcraft franchise and Heroes of the Storm
