= Sylvan Lake (Cass County, Minnesota) =

Lake in the state of Minnesota, United States

- Location within Minnesota
- Location: Cass County, Minnesota
- Coordinates: 46°22′N 94°23.5′W
- Type: lake

Sylvan Lake is a lake in Cass County, Minnesota, in the United States.

The name of Sylvan Lake is descriptive, for in mythology Sylvan is a wooded place.

== See also ==
- List of lakes in Minnesota
