= SS Sylvania =

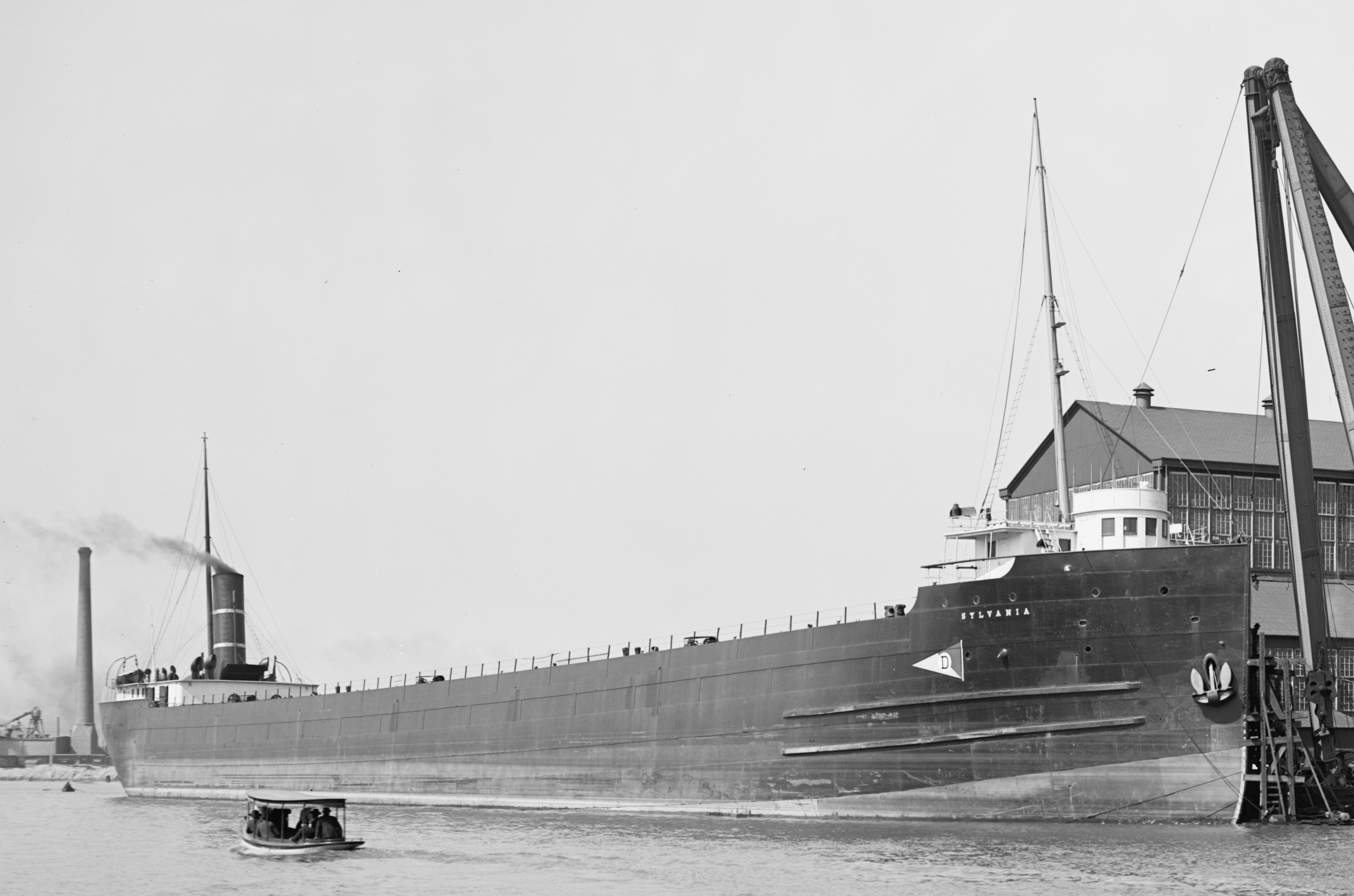
- Sylvania

History

United States
- Name: Sylvania (1905-1914); D.M. Philbin (1914-1929); Sylvania (1929-1983)
- Namesake: Sylvania ("forest land" in Latin)
- Operator: Duluth Steamship Company (1905-1954); The Tomlinson Fleet Corporation (1954-1971); Columbia Transportation Company (1971-1983)
- Port of registry: United States, Wilmington, Delaware
- Builder: West Bay City Shipbuilding Company
- Yard number: 613
- Launched: 18 March 1905
- Completed: April 1905
- In service: 1905
- Out of service: 1984
- Identification: U.S. Registry #201840; IMO number: 5347269
- Fate: Scrapped in Ashtabula, Ohio in 1984
- Notes: She had a total of six collisions in her 79-year career

General characteristics
- Tonnage: 6,272 gross 4,826 net
- Length: 524 ft (160 m) (1905-1957) 572 ft (174 m) (1957-1983)
- Beam: 54 ft (16 m)
- Height: 26.7 ft (8.1 m)
- Installed power: 2× Scotch marine boilers
- Propulsion: 1,800 horsepower Triple expansion steam engine
- Speed: 10 knots
- Capacity: 10,500 tons
- Crew: 25

The SS Sylvania was a 572-foot (174 m) (Originally 524-foot (160 m) long) Great Lakes freighter that had a long 79-year career on the Great Lakes. Sylvania was built by the West Bay City Shipbuilding Company of West Bay City, Michigan as hull #613. She was built for the Duluth Steamship Company of Duluth, Minnesota.

She had six accidents in her career, the first one occurred on June 12, 1905 when Sylvania collided with the steamer Sir Henry Bessemer of Whitefish Point, Lake Superior because of confused passing signals.

In 1914 the ship's name was changed to D.M. Philbin, she sailed with this name until August 30, 1929 when her name was changed back to Sylvania. On August 30, 1916 she had a collision with the John W. Gates at the ore docks in Duluth. On May 19, 1918 she collided with the steamer Belgium two miles off Whitefish Point in a dense fog. On July 3, 1922 she had a collision with the Orlando M. Poe in the Detroit River suffering a minimal amount of damage. On April 30, 1929 Sylvania grounded on the north side of Lake Erie after the crew mistook the Conneaut airport beacon for a navigation light, shortly after this the ship ran aground on a sandbar off Whitman's Creek to the west of Conneaut, Ohio.

== New owners ==
Sylvania being repaired after her collision with the Sir Henry Bessemer

In 1954 Sylvania was purchased by the Tomlinson Fleet Corporation of Cleveland, Ohio. In the winter of 1957-1958 the ship was lengthened 48 feet to 572 feet long, and converted to a self-unloader by Manitowoc Shipbuilding Company of Wisconsin. On June 1, 1967 she sank in 27-foot (8.2 m) of water while unloading stone under the Blue Water Bridge after the Canada Steamship Lines package freighter Renvoyle lost control because of the strong currents and rammed Sylvania at 10:10 p.m. on the starboard side at the 27th hatch. She was refloated by the McQueen Marine Building Company, and she arrived at Lorain, Ohio for repairs the next day. On 29 November 1968 she had a collision with the Diamond Alkali in the Fighting Island Channel of the Detroit River during a snow squall, she was repaired at American Shipbuilding Company of Lorain.

== Final years of service ==
In 1971 Sylvania was sold to the Columbia Transportation Company of Cleveland, Ohio. On September 1, 1972 the ship stranded in the Detroit River. On November 8, 1972 Sylvania ran aground at Belle Isle in the Detroit River while traveling to the Connors Creek power plant. On June 2, 1973 the ship collided with the Frank Purnell north of the Detroit River Light in fog. On August 23, 1973 Sylvania lost her rudder near Trenton, Michigan. On August 20, 1976 a fire broke out in the ship's cargo hold while she was moored at Lorain. On July 31, 1976 the ship ran aground near Trenton.

== Scrapping ==
Sylvania made her last trip on May 10, 1980. She was laid up at Toledo, Ohio and towed to Ashtabula, Ohio by the Triad Salvage Company on November 1, 1983.
