= Sylvan Township =

Sylvan Township may refer to the following places in the United States:

- Sylvan Township, Washtenaw County, Michigan
- Sylvan Township, Cass County, Minnesota
- Sylvan Township, Osceola County, Michigan

See also

- Sylvania Township (disambiguation)
