= Sylvain =

Sylvain is the French form of Silvanus. It may refer to:

== People ==
- Sylvain Archambault (born 1963), Canadian director
- Sylvain Bied (1965–2011), French footballer and manager
- Sylvain Cappell (born 1946), American mathematician
- Sylvain Chavanel (born 1979), French cyclist
- Sylvain Chomet (born 1963), French animator
- Sylvain Cloutier (born 1974), Canadian ice hockey player
- Sylvain Cossette (born 1963), Canadian pop vocalist
- Sylvain Côté (born 1966), Canadian ice hockey player
- Sylvain Cros (born 1980), French freestyle swimmer
- Sylvaine Dampierre, French documentary filmmaker
- Sylvain Distin (born 1977), French footballer
- Sylvan Ebanks-Blake (born 1986), British footballer
- Sylvain Eugène Raynal (1867–1939), French army officer
- Sylvain Estibal (born 1967), French journalist, writer, and film director
- Sylvain Garel (born 1956), French politician and human-rights activist
- Sylvain Grenier (born 1977), Canadian wrestler
- Sylvain Guintoli (born 1982), French motorcycle racer
- Sylvain Arend (1902–1992), Belgian astronomer
- Sylvain Lefebvre (born 1967), Canadian ice hockey player
- Sylvain Légaré (born 1970), Canadian politician
- Sylvain Longchambon (born 1980), French ice dancer
- Sylvain Maréchal (1750–1803), French essayist
- Sylvain Neuvel (born 1973), Canadian science fiction author
- Sylvain Remy (born 1980), Beninese footballer
- Sylvain Richard (born 1979), French rapper, disc jockey, and producer known as 20syl
- Sylvain Sylvain (1951–2021), American rock guitarist (New York Dolls)
- Sylvain Templier (born 1971), French politician
- Sylvain Turgeon (born 1965), Canadian ice hockey player
- Sylvain Wiltord (born 1974), French footballer

== Fictional characters ==
- Sylvain Jose Gautier, a fictional character from the video games Fire Emblem: Three Houses and Fire Emblem Warriors: Three Hopes

== See also ==
- Silvain (disambiguation), variant spelling
- Saint-Sylvain (disambiguation)
- Sylvan (disambiguation)
