= Silvani =

Silvani is a surname of Italian origin. The surname derives from Latin silva (“forest”) and could have been used by the Romans to refer to their slaves that had Transylvanian origin (in modern Romania and Hungary).

Notable people and characters with the surname include:

- Al Silvani (1910–1996), American boxing trainer, actor, and stuntman
- Aldo Silvani (1891–1964), Italian film actor
- Gherardo Silvani (1579–1675), Florentine architect and sculptor of the Baroque era who built Villa di Uligliano also in Tuscany
- Marco Silvani, character on Australian soap opera Neighbours
- Mary Silvani (1948–1982), American murder victim
- Pier Francesco Silvani (1620–1685), Florentine architect of the Baroque era
- Walter Silvani (born 1971), Argentine footballer
