= German trawler V 423 Keryado II =

History
- Name: Silvain (1904–16); Thorstein Ingolffson (1916–17); Chimpanzé (1917–19); Keryado (1919–31); Keryado II (1931–55)
- Owner: Stoomvisserij Maatschappij Mercurius (1904–16); P. J. Thorsteinsson (1916–17); French Navy (1917–19); Société Anonyme Chaloutiers de l'Ouest (1919– ); R. Benoist (by 1930–31); Société Vasse et Compagnie (1931–42); Kriegsmarine (1942–45); Philippe Vasse et Compagnie (1945–55)
- Port of registry: IJmuiden, Netherlands (1904–16); (Denmark) Reykjavík, Iceland (1916–17); French Navy (1917–19); Saint-Nazaire, France (1919- ); Fécamp, France (by 1930–42); Kriegsmarine (1942–45); (France) Fécamp (1945–55)
- Builder: M. van der Kuijl
- Yard number: 326
- Launched: 1904
- Commissioned: 1917 (French Navy); 20 August 1942 (Kriegsmarine)
- Identification: Code Letters LOFJ (1916–17); Code Letters OKTH (1919-34); Fishing boat registration F 751 (by 1930–42, 1945–55); Code Letters FNVM (1934–42); Pennant Number V 423 (1942–4
- Fate: Scrapped

General characteristics
- Type: Fishing trawler (1904–17, 1919–42, 1945–55); Watchboat (1917–19); Vorpostenboot (1942–44)
- Tonnage: 320 GRT, 147 NRT
- Length: 41.18 m (135 ft 1 in)
- Beam: 7.05 m (23 ft 2 in)
- Draught: 4.29 m (14 ft 1 in)
- Installed power: Triple expansion steam engine, 49nhp
- Propulsion: Single screw propeller
- Speed: 9.5 knots (17.6 km/h)

Keryado was a French fishing trawler that was built in 1904 Silvain for Dutch owners. She was sold to Iceland in 1916 and renamed Thorstein Ingolffson. In 1917 she was acquired by the French Navy for use as the watchboat Chimpanzé. She was sold in 1919 and became the French fishing boat Keryado, later Keryado II. In 1942, she was requisitioned by the Kriegsmarine, serving as the Vorpostenboot V 423 Keryado II. She was returned to her owners in 1945 and was scrapped in 1955.

== Description ==
The ship 41.18 metres (135 ft 1 in) long, with a beam of 7.05 metres (23 ft 2 in). She had a draught of 4.29 metres (14 ft 1 in). She was assessed at 320 GRT, 147 NRT. She was powered by a triple expansion steam engine, which had cylinders of 31 centimetres (12 1/8 in), 51 centimetres (20 in) and 81 centimetres (32 in) diameter by 58 centimetres (23 in) stroke. The engine was built by Wilton's Engineering & Slipway Co., Rotterdam, South Holland, Netherlands. It was rated at 49nhp. It drove a single screw propeller. It could propel the ship at 9.5 knots (17.6 km/h).

== History ==
The ship was built as yard number 326 by M. van der Kuijl, Slikkerveer, South Holland, Netherlands, for the Stoomvisserij Maatschappij Mercurius, IJmuiden, North Holland. She was named Silvain. In 1916, she was sold to P. J. Thorsteinsson, Reykjavík, Iceland, and was renamed Thorstein Ingolffson. The Code Letters LOFJ were allocated. (Note: Gröner lists her as Thorstein) In 1917, she was acquired by the French Navy, serving until 1919 as the watchboat Chimpanzé.

In 1919, she was sold to the Société Anonyme Chautiers de l'Ouest, Saint-Nazaire, Ille-et-Vilaine, France, becoming the French fishing boat Keryado. The Code Letters OKTH were allocated. (Note: Gröner lists her as Ker-Yado, but this name is not supported by Lloyd's Register.) Based at Fécamp, Seine-Inférieure, the fishing boat registration F 751 was allocated,. By 1930, she was owned by R.Benoist. According to Lloyd's Register, she was renamed Keryado II in 1931 and had been sold to the Société Vasse et Compagnie, Fécamp. (Note: Gröner does not record a change of name.) In 1934, her Code Letters were changed to FOHW.

Keryado II was requisitioned by the Kriegsmarine in 1942 for use as a vorpostenboot. She was commissioned on 20 August 1942 as V 423 Keryado II. She was returned to her owners in 1945. Société Vasse et Compagnie was by now Philippe Vasse et Compagnie. The Code Letters FORW were allocated. Keryado II was scrapped in 1955.

== Sources ==
- Gröner, Erich (1993). Die deutschen Kriegsschiffe 1815-1945 (in German). Vol. 8/I: Flußfahrzeuge, Ujäger, Vorpostenboote, Hilfsminensucher, Küstenschutzverbände (Teil 1). Koblenz: Bernard & Graefe. ISBN 3-7637-4807-5.
