= 519 Sylvania =

Main-belt asteroid

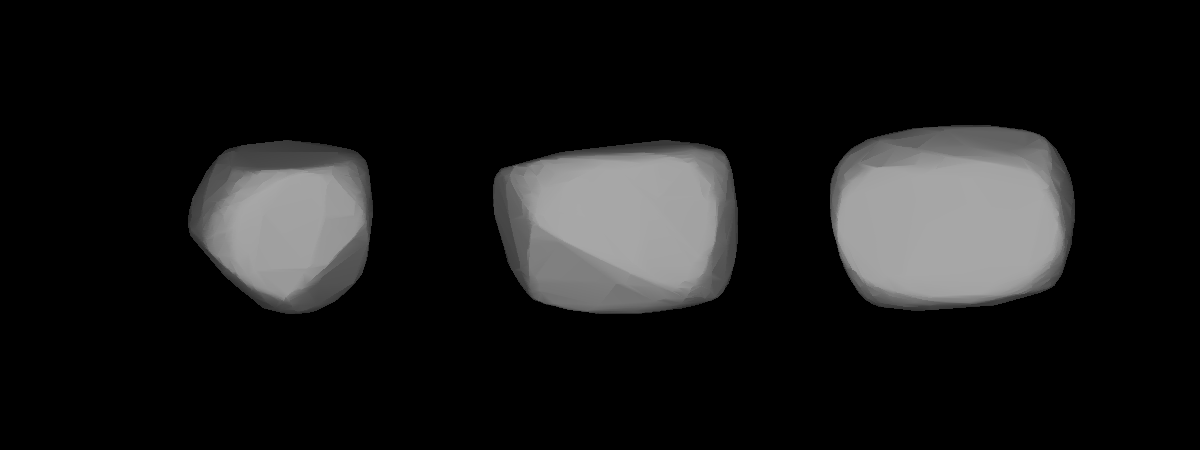
- A three-dimensional model of 519 Sylvania based on its light curve

Discovery
- Discovered by: Raymond Smith Dugan
- Discovery site: Heidelberg
- Discovery date: 20 October 1903

Designations
- Pronunciation: /sɪlˈveɪniə/
- Alternative designations: 1903 MP

Orbital characteristics
- Epoch 31 July 2016 (JD 2457600.5)
- Uncertainty parameter 0
- Observation arc: 112.35 yr (41035 d)
- Aphelion: 3.3071 AU (494.74 Gm)
- Perihelion: 2.2703 AU (339.63 Gm)
- Semi-major axis: 2.7887 AU (417.18 Gm)
- Eccentricity: 0.18590
- Orbital period (sidereal): 4.66 yr (1,700.9 d)
- Mean anomaly: 103.905°
- Mean motion: 0° 12^{m} 41.94^{s} / day
- Inclination: 11.021°
- Longitude of ascending node: 44.746°
- Argument of perihelion: 302.430°

Physical characteristics
- Mean radius: 24.125±1.15 km
- Synodic rotation period: 17.962 h (0.7484 d)
- Geometric albedo: 0.1676±0.017
- Spectral type: S
- Absolute magnitude (H): 9.14

519 Sylvania is a minor planet orbiting the Sun in the main belt. It was discovered on 20 October 1903 by American astronomer R. S. Dugan at the Heidelberg observatory. The name is Latin for forest lands. 519 Sylvania is orbiting the Sun at a distance of 2.79 AU with an eccentricity (ovalness) of 0.186 and a period of 4.66 yr. The orbital plane is inclined at an angle of 11.0° to the ecliptic. This S-type (stony) asteroid has an estimated diameter of 48 km and is revolving with a period of 17.962 h.
