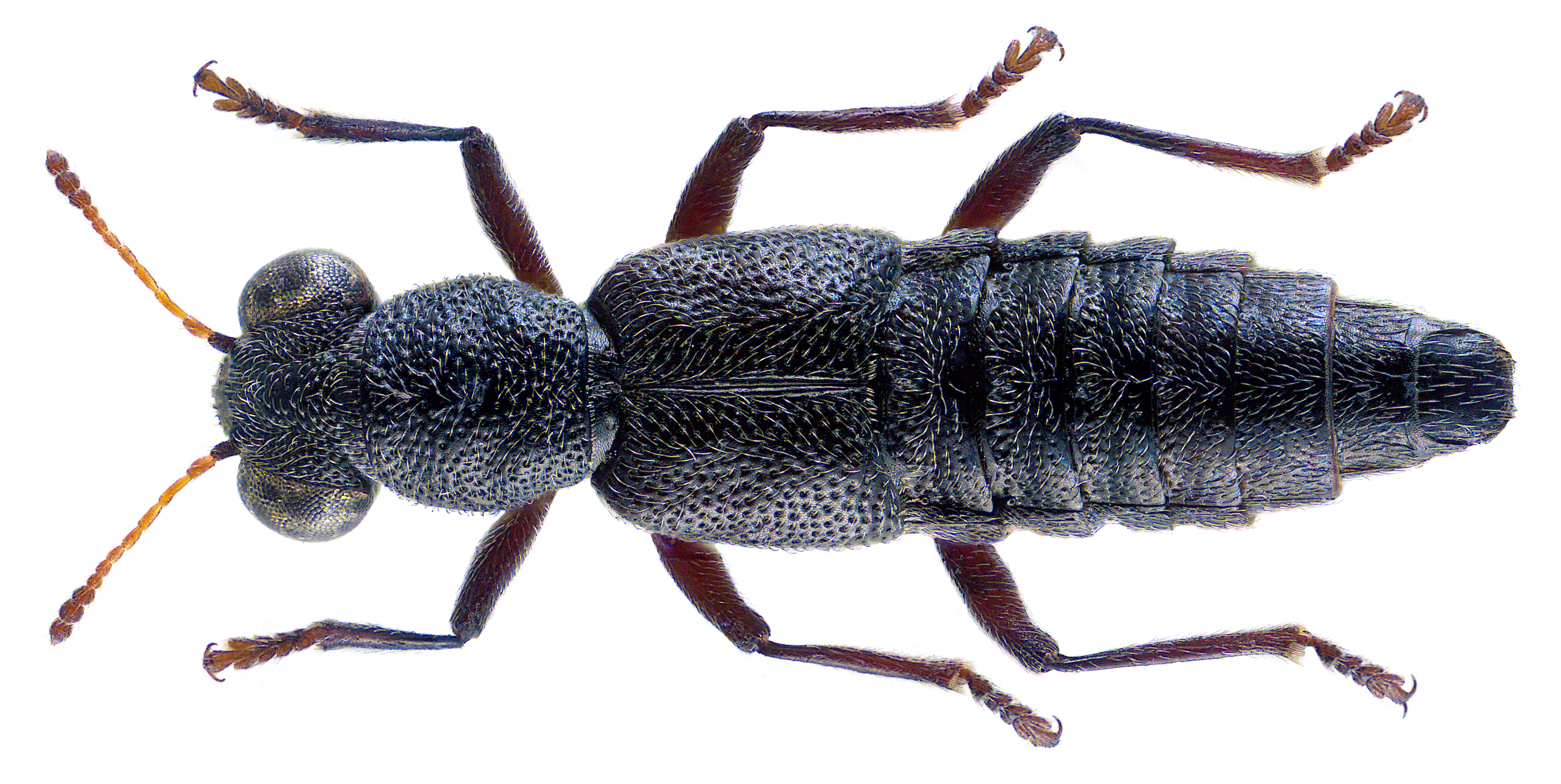
- Stenus bifoveolatus 3.6 mm (3.0 to 4.2 mm)

Scientific classification
- Kingdom: Animalia
- Phylum: Arthropoda
- Class: Insecta
- Order: Coleoptera
- Suborder: Polyphaga
- Infraorder: Staphyliniformia
- Family: Staphylinidae
- Subfamily: Steninae
- Genus: Stenus
- Species: S. bifoveolatus

Binomial name
- Stenus bifoveolatus (Gyllenhal, 1827)

= Stenus bifoveolatus =

Species of beetle

Stenus bifoveolatus is a species of rove beetles native to Europe.
