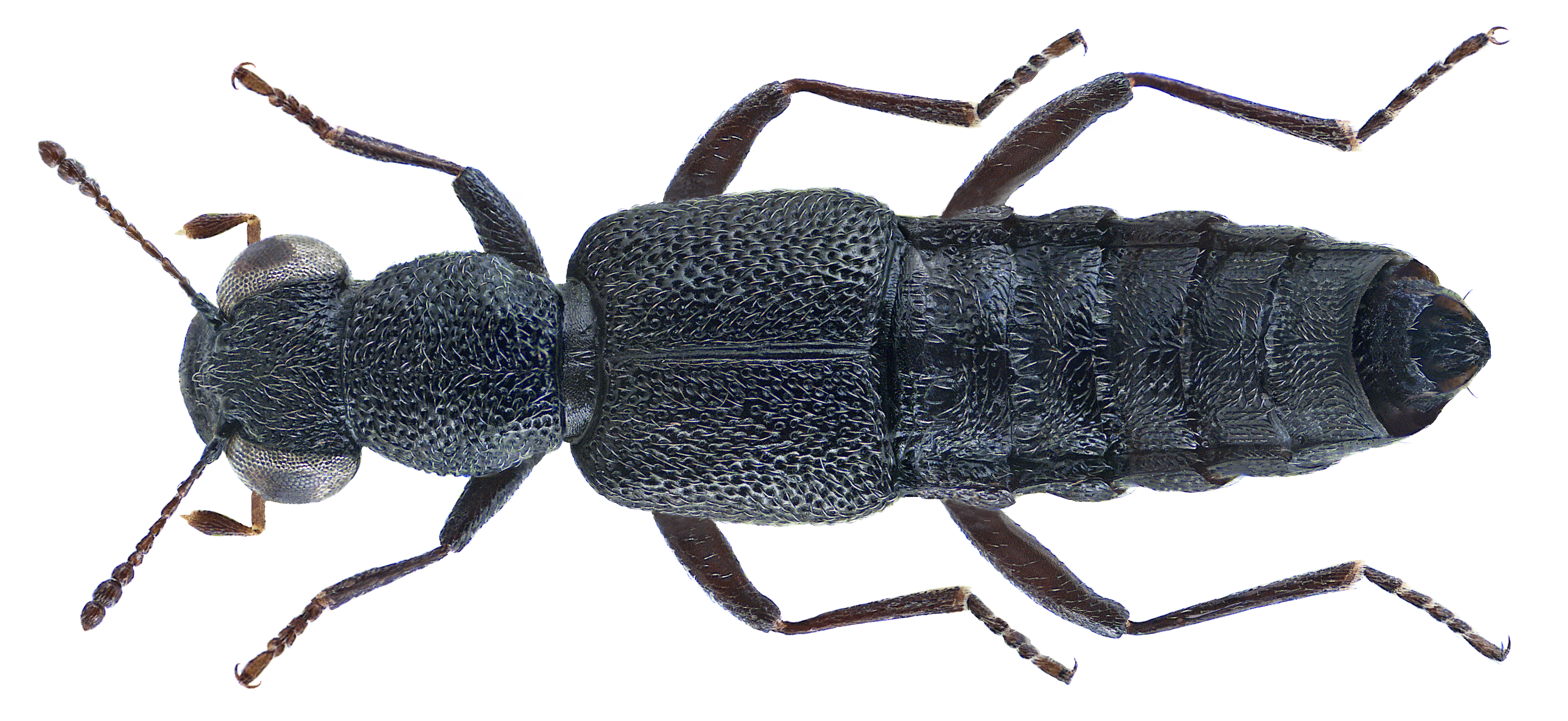
- Stenus canaliculatus 2.9 mm (2.7 to 4.0 mm)

Scientific classification
- Kingdom: Animalia
- Phylum: Arthropoda
- Class: Insecta
- Order: Coleoptera
- Suborder: Polyphaga
- Infraorder: Staphyliniformia
- Family: Staphylinidae
- Subfamily: Steninae
- Genus: Stenus
- Species: S. canaliculatus

Binomial name
- Stenus canaliculatus (Gyllenhal, 1827)

= Stenus canaliculatus =

Species of beetle

Stenus canaliculatus is a species of rove beetles native to Europe.
