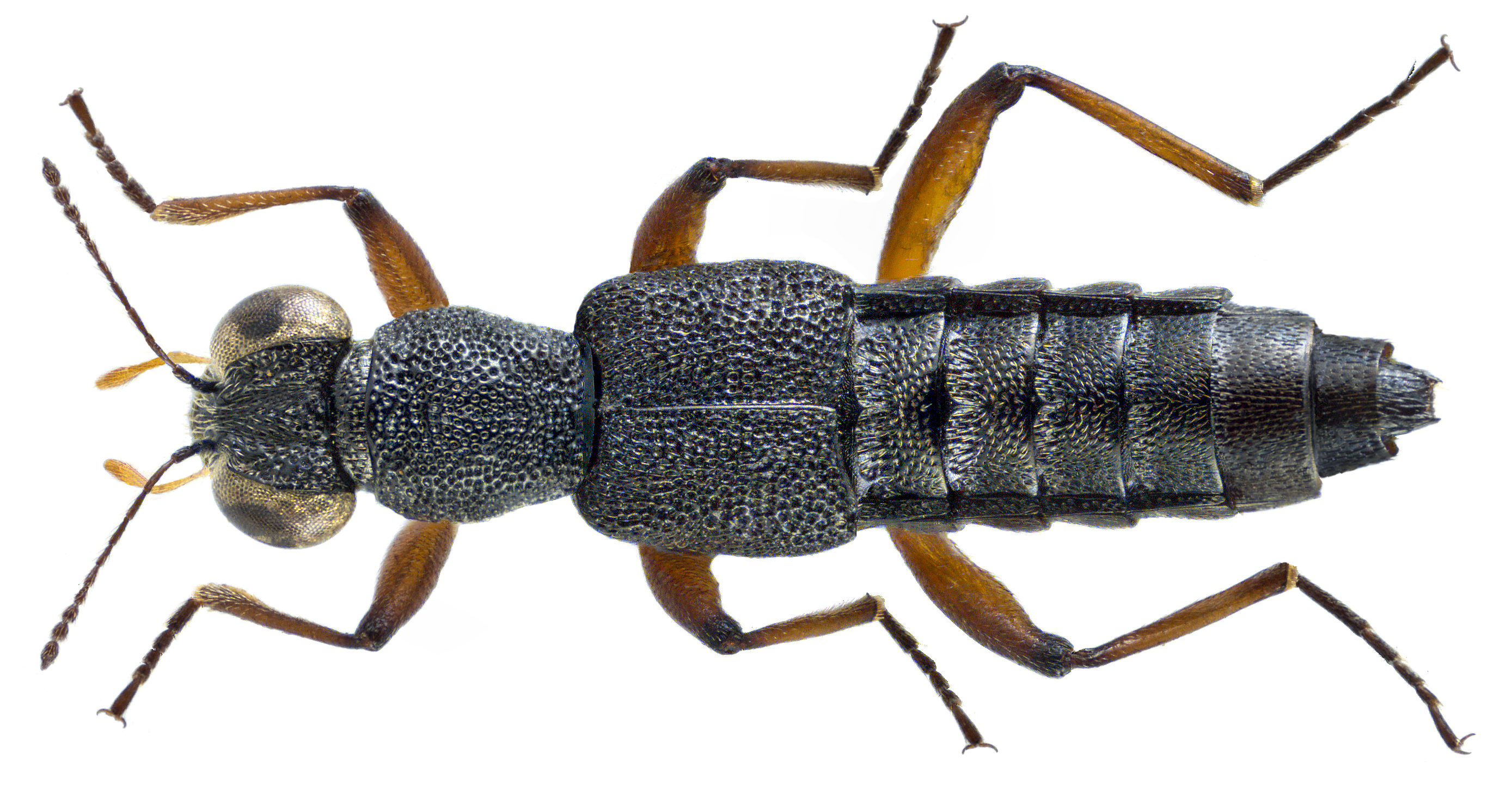

Scientific classification
- Domain: Eukaryota
- Kingdom: Animalia
- Phylum: Arthropoda
- Class: Insecta
- Order: Coleoptera
- Suborder: Polyphaga
- Infraorder: Staphyliniformia
- Family: Staphylinidae
- Genus: Stenus
- Species: S. clavicornis

Binomial name
- Stenus clavicornis (Scopoli, 1763)

= Stenus clavicornis =

Species of beetle

Stenus clavicornis is a species of water skater in the family of beetles known as Staphylinidae.
