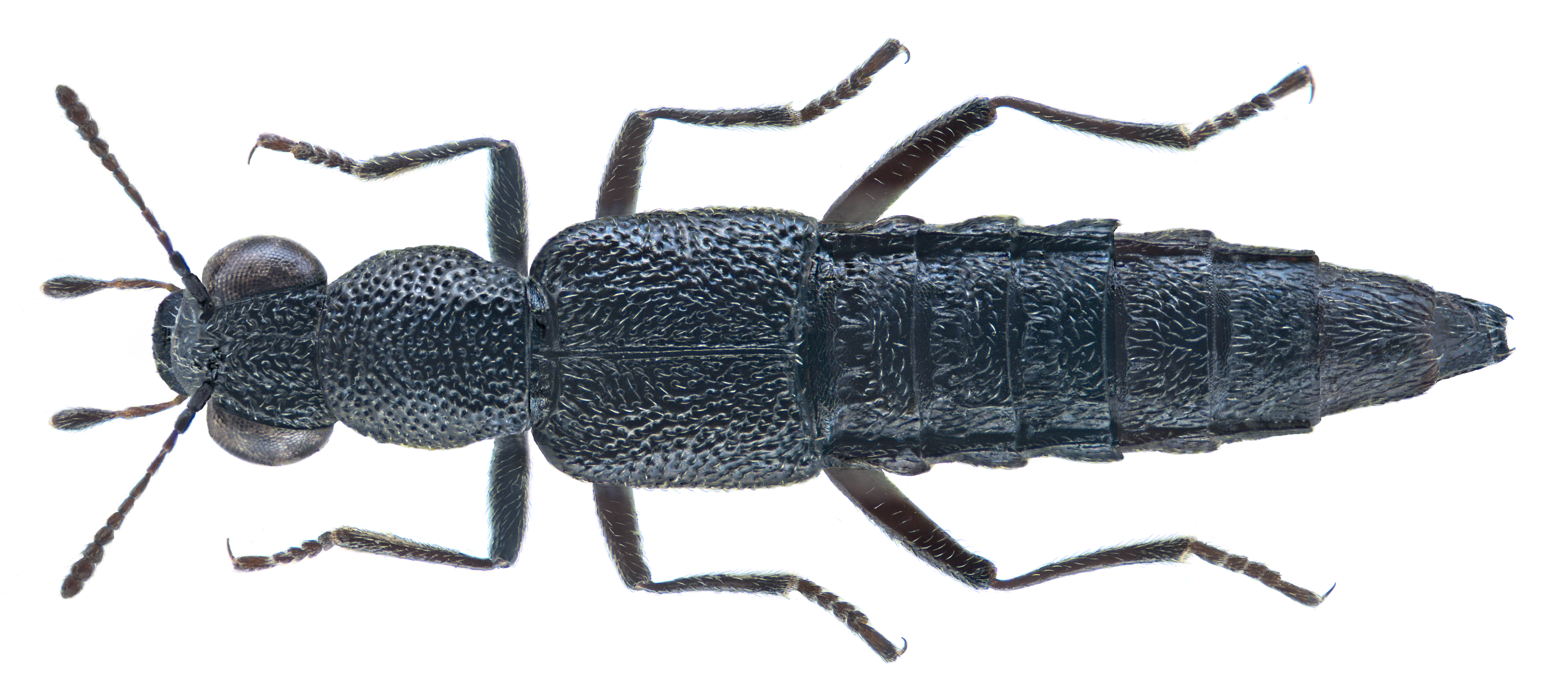

Scientific classification
- Kingdom: Animalia
- Phylum: Arthropoda
- Class: Insecta
- Order: Coleoptera
- Suborder: Polyphaga
- Infraorder: Staphyliniformia
- Family: Staphylinidae
- Genus: Stenus
- Species: S. melanarius

Binomial name
- Stenus melanarius Stephens 1833

= Stenus melanarius =

Species of beetle

Stenus melanarius is a species of rove beetle widely spread in Asia and Europe. It is a natural predator of the pest, Cnaphalocrocis medinalis.

== Subspecies ==
Two subspecies are recognized:

- Stenus melanarius melanarius Stephens, 1833
- Stenus melanarius verecundus Sharp, 1874
