= Stenus solutus =

Scientific classification
- Kingdom: Animalia
- Phylum: Arthropoda
- Class: Insecta
- Order: Coleoptera
- Suborder: Polyphaga
- Infraorder: Staphyliniformia
- Family: Staphylinidae
- Genus: Stenus
- Species: S. solutus

Binomial name
- Stenus solutus Erichson, 1840

Species of beetle

Stenus solutus is a species of rove beetle widely spread in Asia and England.

== Description ==
It is very similar to Stenus cicindeloides. Male is about 6.5 mm and female is about 5.0 mm in length. Antennae base is yellowish with darkened from 5th segment. Head, thorax and elytra are entirely punctate. Basal segments of abdomen are rugose basally, where the apical segments are finely punctate throughout. Legs are darkened where the 4th tarsal segment is strongly bilobed.

Adults are usually found from May through to November. They inhabit on wet mud and among dense riverside vegetation.

In the pygidial gland secretions of the species, the piperidine alkaloids called cicindeloine is found as a main compound. Also (E)-3-(2-methyl-1-butenyl)pyridine and traces of stenusine can be found as defensive alkaloids against predation and microorganismic infestation.
