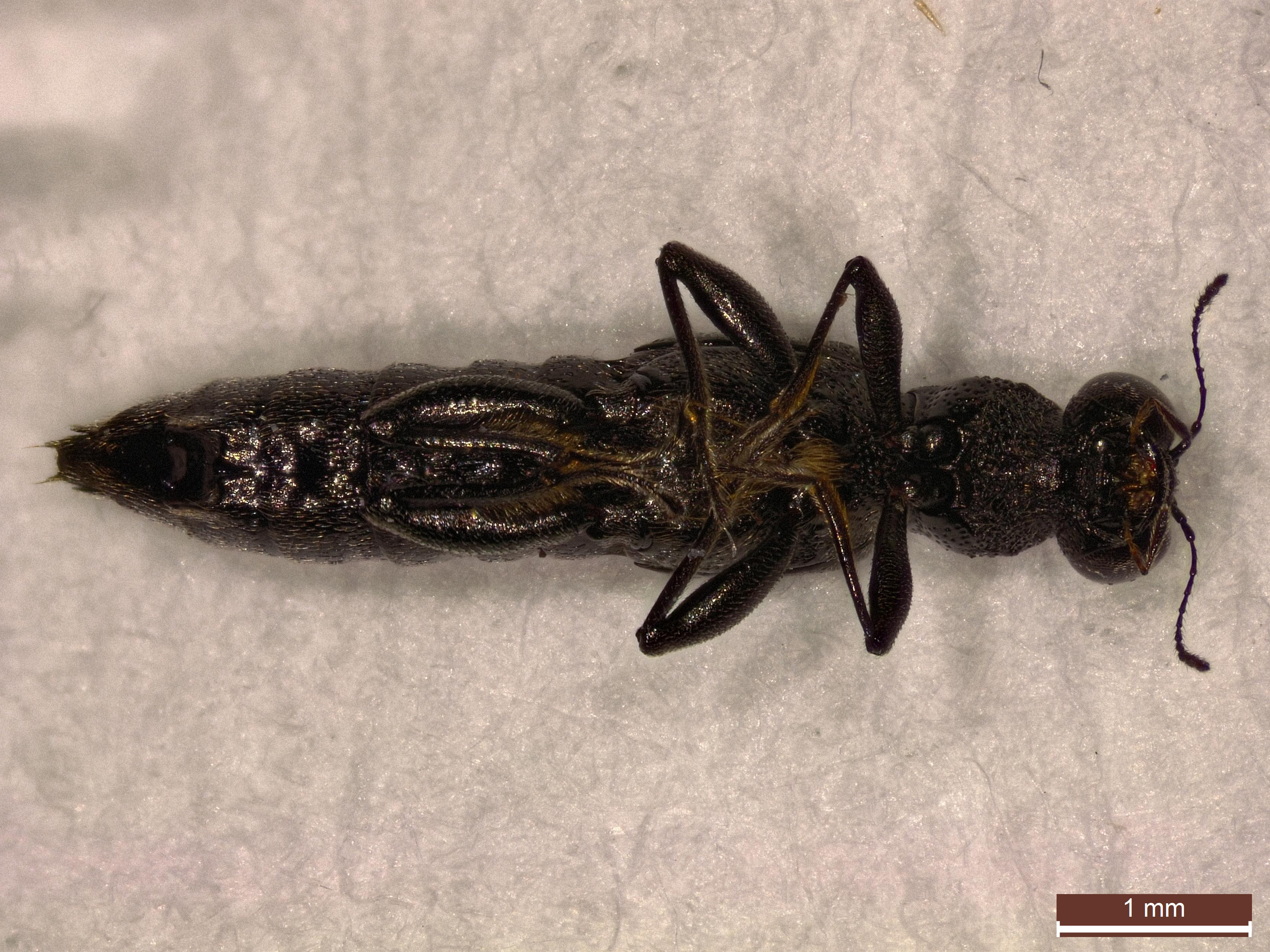

Scientific classification
- Domain: Eukaryota
- Kingdom: Animalia
- Phylum: Arthropoda
- Class: Insecta
- Order: Coleoptera
- Suborder: Polyphaga
- Infraorder: Staphyliniformia
- Family: Staphylinidae
- Genus: Stenus
- Species: S. juno

Binomial name
- Stenus juno Fabricius

= Stenus juno =

Species of beetle

Stenus juno is a species of predatory beetle in the family Staphylinidae. It is found in Europe and North America.
