= Stenus stygicus =

Scientific classification
- Domain: Eukaryota
- Kingdom: Animalia
- Phylum: Arthropoda
- Class: Insecta
- Order: Coleoptera
- Suborder: Polyphaga
- Infraorder: Staphyliniformia
- Family: Staphylinidae
- Genus: Stenus
- Species: S. stygicus

Binomial name
- Stenus stygicus Say

Species of beetle

Stenus stygicus is a species of water skater in the beetle family Staphylinidae. It is found in North America.
