= Stenus sculptilis =

Scientific classification
- Kingdom: Animalia
- Phylum: Arthropoda
- Class: Insecta
- Order: Coleoptera
- Suborder: Polyphaga
- Infraorder: Staphyliniformia
- Family: Staphylinidae
- Genus: Stenus
- Species: S. sculptilis

Binomial name
- Stenus sculptilis Casey

Species of beetle

Stenus sculptilis is a species of beetle family Staphylinidae. It is found in western North America.
