= Stenus semicolon =

Scientific classification
- Domain: Eukaryota
- Kingdom: Animalia
- Phylum: Arthropoda
- Class: Insecta
- Order: Coleoptera
- Suborder: Polyphaga
- Infraorder: Staphyliniformia
- Family: Staphylinidae
- Genus: Stenus
- Species: S. semicolon

Binomial name
- Stenus semicolon Le Conte

Species of beetle

Stenus semicolon is a species of water skater in the beetle family Staphylinidae.
