= Stenus colon =

Scientific classification
- Domain: Eukaryota
- Kingdom: Animalia
- Phylum: Arthropoda
- Class: Insecta
- Order: Coleoptera
- Suborder: Polyphaga
- Infraorder: Staphyliniformia
- Family: Staphylinidae
- Genus: Stenus
- Species: S. colon

Binomial name
- Stenus colon Say

Species of beetle

Stenus colon is a species of water skater, Genus Stenus, in the beetle family Staphylinidae. It is found in the North Americas .
