= Stenus zunicus =

Scientific classification
- Kingdom: Animalia
- Phylum: Arthropoda
- Class: Insecta
- Order: Coleoptera
- Suborder: Polyphaga
- Infraorder: Staphyliniformia
- Family: Staphylinidae
- Genus: Stenus
- Species: S. zunicus

Binomial name
- Stenus zunicus Casey, 1884

Species of beetle

Stenus zunicus is a species of rove beetle described by Thomas Lincoln Casey Jr. in 1884.
