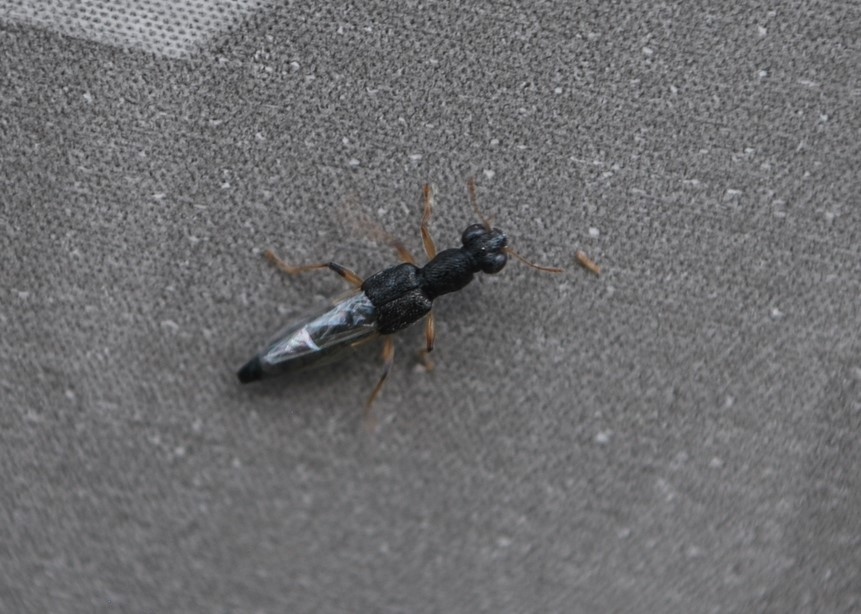

Scientific classification
- Kingdom: Animalia
- Phylum: Arthropoda
- Class: Insecta
- Order: Coleoptera
- Suborder: Polyphaga
- Infraorder: Staphyliniformia
- Family: Staphylinidae
- Genus: Stenus
- Species: S. flavicornis

Binomial name
- Stenus flavicornis Erichson

= Stenus flavicornis =

Species of beetle

Stenus flavicornis is a species of water skater in the beetle family Staphylinidae. It is found in North America.
