= Stenus alpicola =

Scientific classification
- Domain: Eukaryota
- Kingdom: Animalia
- Phylum: Arthropoda
- Class: Insecta
- Order: Coleoptera
- Suborder: Polyphaga
- Infraorder: Staphyliniformia
- Family: Staphylinidae
- Genus: Stenus
- Species: S. alpicola

Binomial name
- Stenus alpicola Fauvel

Species of beetle

Stenus alpicola is a species of rove beetle in the genus Stenus. It was described in 1872.
