= Stenusin =

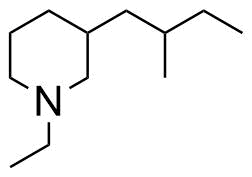

Names
- IUPAC name 1-Ethyl-3-(2-methylbutyl)-piperidine
- Other names: N-Ethyl-3-(2-methylbutyl)piperidine; Stenusine

Identifiers
CAS Number	54985-88-5
3D model (JSmol)	Interactive image
ChEBI	CHEBI:68995
ChemSpider	2284770
MeSH	stenusin
PubChem CID	3016925
CompTox Dashboard (EPA)	DTXSID40970334
- InChI: InChI=DYZADDXQHPDPNW-UHFFFAOYSA-N
- SMILES: CCC(C)CC1CCCN(C1)CC

Properties
Chemical formula	C_{12}H_{25}N
Molar mass	183.339 g·mol^{−1}
- Except where otherwise noted, data are given for materials in their standard state (at 25 °C [77 °F], 100 kPa). Infobox references

Stenusin is a piperidine alkaloid molecule synthesized by rove beetles of the genus Stenus. By lowering its abdomen and releasing stenusin, this genus of rove beetle are able to quickly escape predators through a process called skimming. Skimming is caused by the low surface tension of stenusin, which rapidly spreads over water surfaces when emitted and allows the beetle to glide away from danger.

== Biosynthesis ==
Stenusin is biosynthesized in the pygidial glands of Stenus Latreille, located in the last three segments of the beetles' abdomen. This molecule is the enzymatic product of several reactions that utilize L-lysine, L-isoleucine, and an acetate source. First, both L-lysine and L-isoleucine undergo separate decarboxylation reactions followed by oxidative deamination. The product created from L-lysine undergoes intramolecular Schiff base formation to create the piperidine ring found in stenusin. The two amino acid products then combine through a Stork enamine alkylation reaction and are further acylated and reduced to form stenusin.

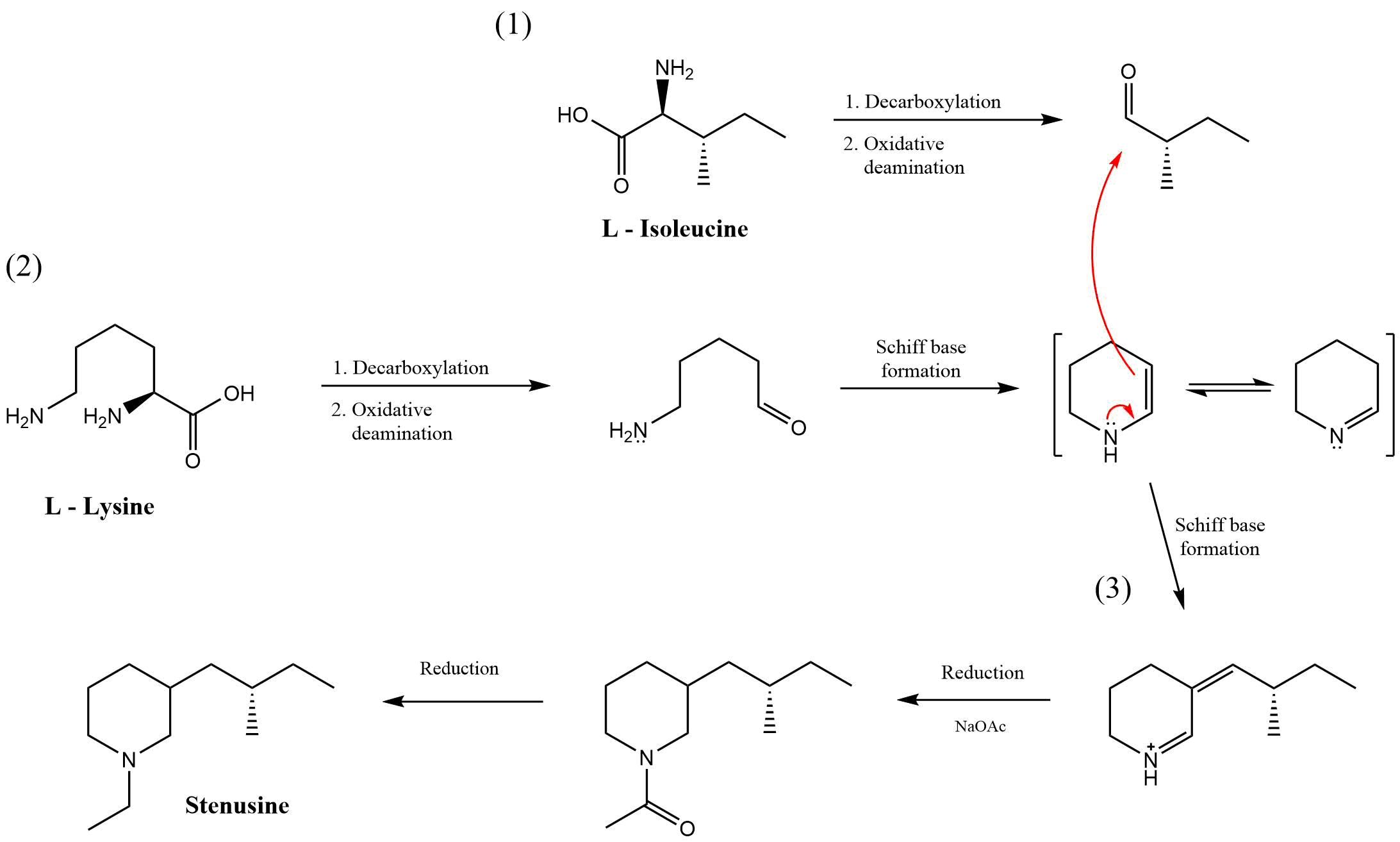
Stenusin biosynthesis
