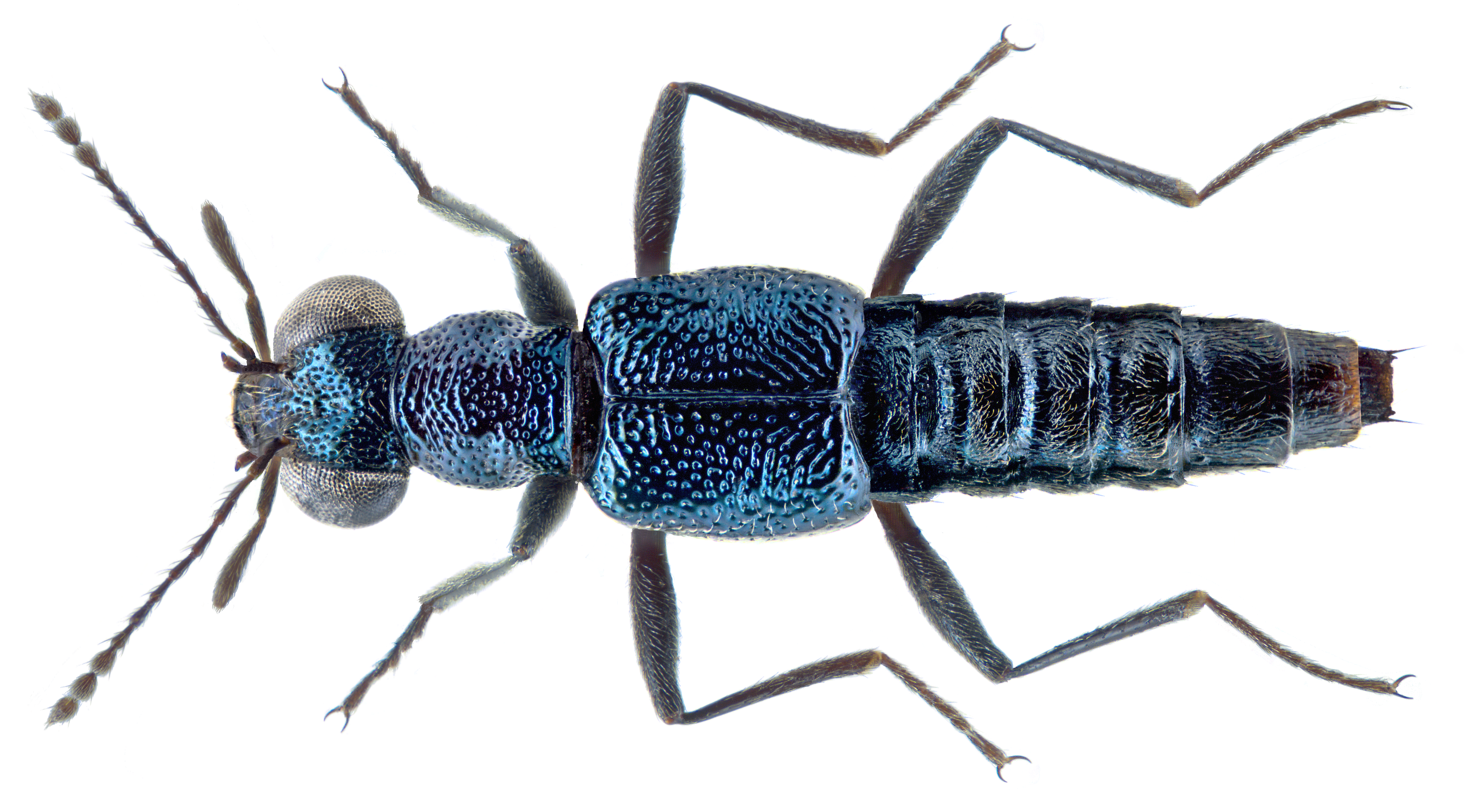
- male D. biformis holotype

Scientific classification
- Kingdom: Animalia
- Phylum: Arthropoda
- Class: Insecta
- Order: Coleoptera
- Suborder: Polyphaga
- Infraorder: Staphyliniformia
- Family: Staphylinidae
- Genus: Dianous; Leach, 1819

= Dianous =

Genus of beetles

Dianous is a genus of beetles belonging to the family Staphylinidae.

The species of this genus are found in Europe, Asia and North America.

== Species ==
- Dianous acuminifer Puthz, 1984
- Dianous acutatus Puthz, 2016
- Dianous acutus Zheng, 1994
- Dianous adonis Puthz, 2000
- Dianous aeneus Cameron, 1930
- Dianous aequalis Zheng, 1993
- Dianous aerator Puthz, 2016
- Dianous aereus Champion, 1919
- Dianous alcyoneus Puthz, 2000
- Dianous alternans Zheng & Fa-Ke, 1993
- Dianous amamiensis Sawada, 1960
- Dianous amicus Puthz, 1988
- Dianous andrewesi Cameron, 1914
- Dianous angulifer Puthz, 2000
- Dianous annandalei Bernhauer, 1911
- Dianous annapurnaensis Puthz, 2015
- Dianous arachnipes Puthz, 1971
- Dianous asperifrons Puthz, 2016
- Dianous assamensis Cameron, 1927
- Dianous ater Puthz, 2000
- Dianous atrocoeruleus Puthz, 2000
- Dianous atrocyaneus Puthz, 2000
- Dianous atroviolaceus Puthz, 2000
- Dianous aurichalceus Champion, 1920
- Dianous azureus Champion, 1919
- Dianous baliensis Rougemont, 1984
- Dianous banghaasi Bernhauer, 1916
- Dianous bashanensis Zheng, 1994
- Dianous bellulus Puthz, 2016
- Dianous bellus Sheng, Qin-Fen, Tang & Li, 2009
- Dianous benicki Puthz, 1981
- Dianous betzi Puthz, 2015
- Dianous bhotius Rougemont, 1987
- Dianous bhutanensis Rougemont, 1985
- Dianous biformis Puthz, 2015
- Dianous bifoveifrons Champion, 1921
- Dianous bimaculatus Cameron, 1927
- Dianous bioculatus Puthz, 2000
- Dianous biscobriculifrons Puthz, 2015
- Dianous boops Puthz, 1988
- Dianous borailmontis Puthz, 2015
- Dianous bracteatus Champion, 1920
- Dianous brevicornis Puthz, 2000
- Dianous brevitarsis Puthz, 1990
- Dianous burckhardti Puthz, 1988
- Dianous caeruleolimbatus Puthz, 2016
- Dianous caeruleonotatus Champion, 1919
- Dianous caeruleostigmaticus Puthz, 2015
- Dianous calceatus Puthz, 1990
- Dianous calvicollis Puthz, 2016
- Dianous camelus Puthz, 1990
- Dianous cameroni Champion, 1919
- Dianous cameronianus Jarrige, 1951
- Dianous carinipennis Bernhauer, 1914
- Dianous cebuensis Puthz, 2000
- Dianous chalybeus LeConte, 1863
- Dianous championi Cameron, 1920
- Dianous chetri Rougemont, 1980
- Dianous chinensis Bernhauer, 1916
- Dianous coeruleogutta Puthz, 2016
- Dianous coeruleomicans Puthz, 1997
- Dianous coeruleostigma Puthz, 2016
- Dianous coeruleotinctus Puthz, 2000
- Dianous coeruleovestitus Puthz, 2000
- Dianous coeruleoviridis Puthz, 2016
- Dianous coerulescens Gyllenhal, 1810
- Dianous concretus Puthz, 1988
- Dianous consors Cameron, 1927
- Dianous convexifrons Puthz, 1995
- Dianous corticicola Puthz, 1972
- Dianous corvipenis Puthz, 2015
- Dianous cribrarius Champion, 1919
- Dianous cruentatus Benick, 1942
- Dianous cupreoaeneus Champion, 1923
- Dianous cupreogutta Puthz, 2000
- Dianous cupreonitens Puthz, 2015
- Dianous cupreostigma Puthz, 1984
- Dianous cupreoviolaceus Puthz, 1997
- Dianous cyaneocupreus Puthz, 2000
- Dianous cyaneovirens Cameron, 1930
- Dianous cyanogaster Champion, 1919
- Dianous dabashanus Puthz, 2016
- Dianous dajak Puthz, 1988
- Dianous davaomontium Puthz, 1974
- Dianous davidwrasei Puthz, 2016
- Dianous depressifrons Puthz, 2016
- Dianous deviatus Puthz, 2016
- Dianous distigma Champion, 1919
- Dianous dubiosus Puthz, 2000
- Dianous electrigutta Puthz, 2000
- Dianous elegantulus Zheng, 1993
- Dianous emarginatus Zheng, 1993
- Dianous emeiensis Zheng, 1993
- Dianous endymion Puthz, 2016
- Dianous ernstjuengeri Puthz, 2005
- Dianous falsificatus Puthz, 2016
- Dianous farkaci Puthz, 2016
- Dianous fauveli Puthz, 2000
- Dianous fellowesi Puthz, 2005
- Dianous fellowesianus Puthz, 2016
- Dianous femoralis Cameron, 1927
- Dianous fengtingae Tang & Li, 2011
- Dianous festinus Herman, 2001
- Dianous flavicoxatus Benick, 1928
- Dianous flavoculatus Puthz, 1997
- Dianous flavoguttatus Puthz, 1980
- Dianous fluctivagus Puthz, 1990
- Dianous fornicifrons Puthz, 2015
- Dianous frater Cameron, 1927
- Dianous freyi Benick, 1940
- Dianous fulgdicollis Puthz, 2016
- Dianous gemmosus Puthz, 2000
- Dianous gonggamontis Puthz, 2000
- Dianous gracilipes Champion, 1921
- Dianous gracilis Puthz, 1978
- Dianous grandistigma Puthz, 2000
- Dianous gregarius Rougemont, 1985
- Dianous guillaumei Puthz, 2015
- Dianous hainanensis Puthz, 1997
- Dianous hajeki Puthz, 2015
- Dianous hajekianus Puthz, 2016
- Dianous hammondi Rougemont, 1980
- Dianous haraldi Puthz, 2000
- Dianous hastifer Puthz, 2016
- Dianous hirsutus Rougemont, 1983
- Dianous huanghaoi Tang & Li, 2011
- Dianous hubeiensis Tang & Huang, 2018
- Dianous humaboni Puthz, 2015
- Dianous hummeli Bernhauer, 1934
- Dianous hygrobius Benick, 1932
- Dianous inaequalis Champion, 1919
- Dianous inconspicuus Rougemont, 1985
- Dianous iridicolor Scheerpeltz, 1976
- Dianous iwakisanus Watanabe, 1984
- Dianous jaechi Puthz, 1994
- Dianous japonicus Sawada, 1960
- Dianous javanicola Puthz, 1997
- Dianous kabakovi Puthz, 1980
- Dianous karen Rougemont, 1981
- Dianous karnatakanus Puthz, 2011
- Dianous kejvali Puthz, 2015
- Dianous keralanus Puthz, 2015
- Dianous kinabalumontis Puthz, 1973
- Dianous kishimotoi Puthz, 2005
- Dianous kleebergi Puthz, 2009
- Dianous koreanus Puthz, 2011
- Dianous lahu Rougemont, 1981
- Dianous laoticus Puthz, 2016
- Dianous lasti Puthz, 1981
- Dianous latitarsis Benick, 1942
- Dianous lieni Puthz, 2005
- Dianous lilizheni Tang & Wang, 2018
- Dianous limitaneus Puthz, 2001
- Dianous liratipennis Puthz, 2016
- Dianous lividus Benick, 1929
- Dianous lobatipes Puthz, 2000
- Dianous lobigerus Champion, 1919
- Dianous loebli Rougemont, 1987
- Dianous loeblianus Puthz, 1988
- Dianous luteoguttatus Champion, 1919
- Dianous luteolunatus Puthz, 1980
- Dianous luteostigma Puthz, 2016
- Dianous luteostigmaticus Rougemont, 1986
- Dianous malayanus Cameron, 1936
- Dianous manaslumontium Puthz, 2015
- Dianous margaretae Rougemont, 1985
- Dianous martensi Rougemont, 1983
- Dianous mendax Puthz, 2000
- Dianous meo Rougemont, 1981
- Dianous minor Champion, 1919
- Dianous moritai Naomi, 1991
- Dianous nagamontium Puthz, 1981
- Dianous naicus Puthz, 1988
- Dianous nepalensis Rougemont, 1985
- Dianous niger Rougemont, 1983
- Dianous nigrocyaneus Puthz, 1997
- Dianous nigrovirens Fauvel, 1895
- Dianous nilgiriensis Puthz, 1995
- Dianous ningxiaensis Tang, Liang, & Li, 2013
- Dianous nitidicollis Puthz, 2015
- Dianous nitidulus LeConte, 1874
- Dianous nokrekensis Puthz, 1997
- Dianous obliquenotatus Champion, 1921
- Dianous obscuroguttatus Cameron, 1927
- Dianous ocellatus Cameron, 1930
- Dianous ocellifer Puthz, 2000
- Dianous oculatipennis Puthz, 1980
- Dianous pallitarsis
- Dianous pengi Wang, Tang, & Luo, 2019
- Dianous philippinus
- Dianous poecilus
- Dianous ponticus
- Dianous pseudacutus
- Dianous pseudaerator Tang & Hu, 2018
- Dianous psilopterus
- Dianous punctiventris Champion, 1919
- Dianous puthzi Lundgren, 1984
- Dianous pykaranus
- Dianous radiatus
- Dianous reformator
- Dianous rimosipennis Puthz, 2005
- Dianous robustus
- Dianous rougemonti
- Dianous rougemontianus Puthz, 2000
- Dianous rufidulus Shuai & Tang, 2019
- Dianous rufimontis Puthz, 2016
- Dianous ruginosus Zheng, 1993
- Dianous rugipennis
- Dianous rugosipennis Puthz, 2000
- Dianous ruzickai Puthz, 2016
- Dianous saxicola
- Dianous scabricollis Champion, 1919
- Dianous schillhammeri
- Dianous schoenmanni
- Dianous schuelkei
- Dianous senex
- Dianous shan Rougemont, 1981
- Dianous shibatai Sawada, 1960
- Dianous shibataianus
- Dianous siamensis Rougemont, 1983
- Dianous sichuanensis
- Dianous silvicola
- Dianous silvicultrix
- Dianous siwalikensis Cameron, 1927
- Dianous smetanai
- Dianous socius Zheng, 1993
- Dianous spiniventris
- Dianous srivichaii
- Dianous strabo Puthz, 1995
- Dianous striatellus
- Dianous subtortuosus
- Dianous subvorticosus
- Dianous sucinigutta
- Dianous suciniguttatus
- Dianous sucininotatus
- Dianous sulcatipennis
- Dianous sulcipennis
- Dianous taiwanensis
- Dianous tiomanensis
- Dianous tonkinensis Puthz, 1968
- Dianous tortuosus Champion, 1919
- Dianous tortus
- Dianous transgressor Puthz, 2015
- Dianous tubericollis Puthz, 2015
- Dianous tumidifrons
- Dianous uncinipenis
- Dianous uniformis Zheng, 1993
- Dianous variegatus
- Dianous versicolor
- Dianous versicolorus Puthz, 2016
- Dianous verticosus
- Dianous vietnamensis Puthz, 1980
- Dianous violaceus
- Dianous viridicupreus Rougemont, 1985
- Dianous viridipennis
- Dianous viridisplendens Puthz, 2015
- Dianous viriditinctus Champion, 1920
- Dianous vorticipennis Puthz, 2005
- Dianous wittmeri
- Dianous yangae
- Dianous yao Rougemont, 1981
- Dianous yinziweii
- Dianous yoshidai Naomi, 1988
- Dianous yunnanensis
- Dianous zhejiangensis Shi & Zhou, 2009
