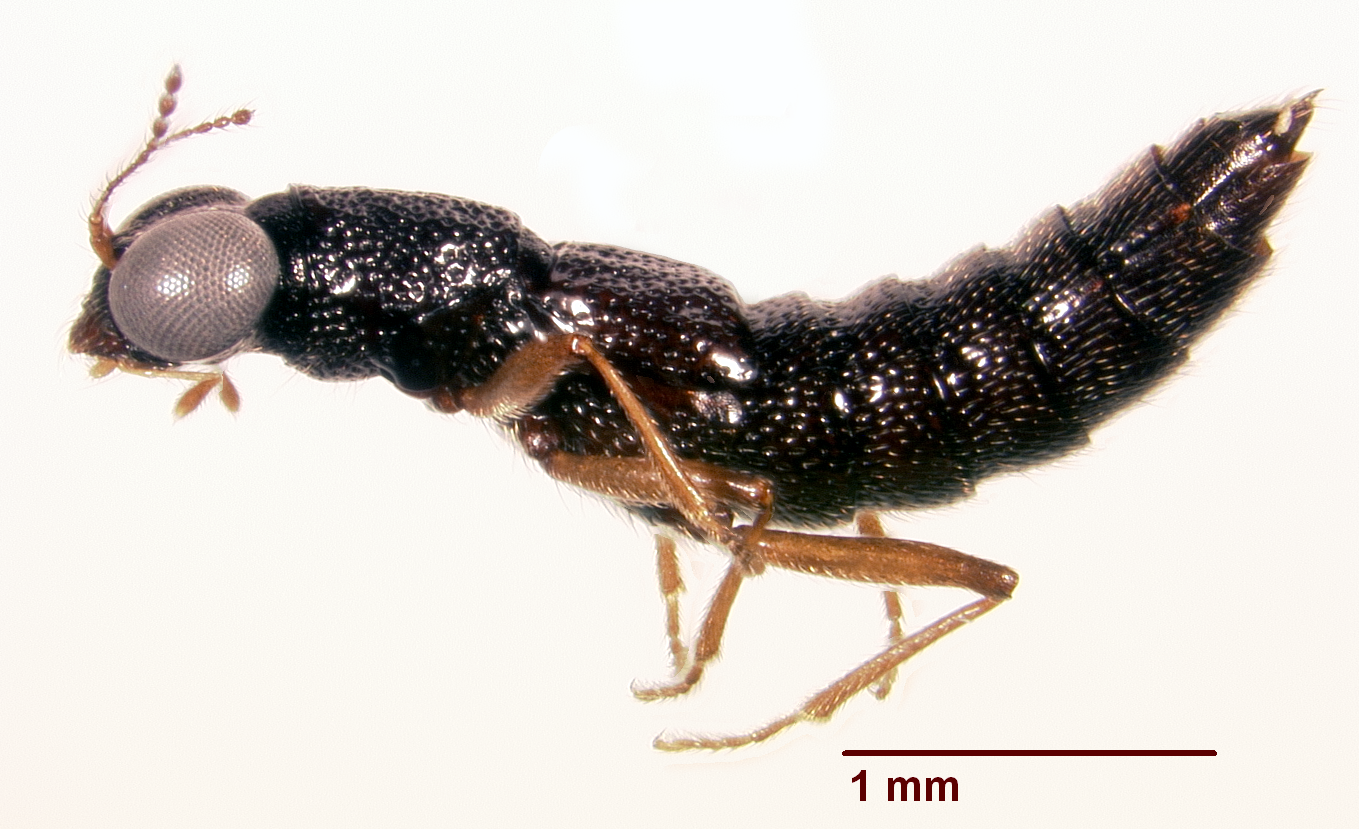
- Stenus sp.

Scientific classification
- Kingdom: Animalia
- Phylum: Arthropoda
- Clade: Pancrustacea
- Class: Insecta
- Order: Coleoptera
- Suborder: Polyphaga
- Infraorder: Staphyliniformia
- Family: Staphylinidae
- Subfamily: Steninae; MacLeay, 1825

Genera
- Dianous; Stenus

= Steninae =

Subfamily of beetles

Steninae is a subfamily of Staphylinidae.

== Anatomy ==
- Antennae interested on vertex between eyes.
- Eyes very large.
- Tarsi 5–5–5.

== Ecology ==
- Habitat: damp areas near streams.
- Collection method: hand collection, sweep net, sifting leaf litter near streams.
- Biology: specialized predators of Collembola.

== Systematics ==
Two genera, Dianous (2 spp.) and Stenus (167 spp.) in North America.

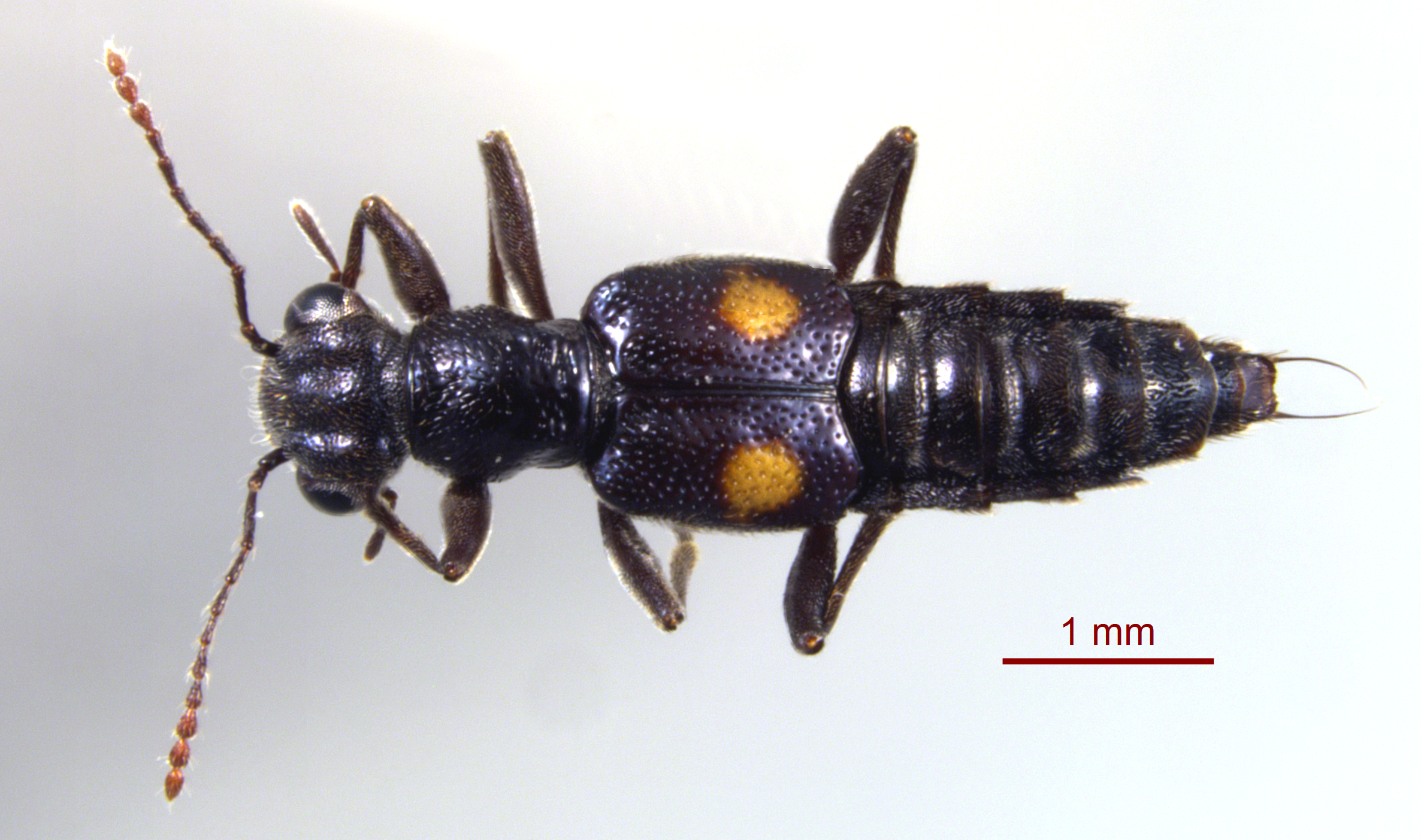
Dianous sp.

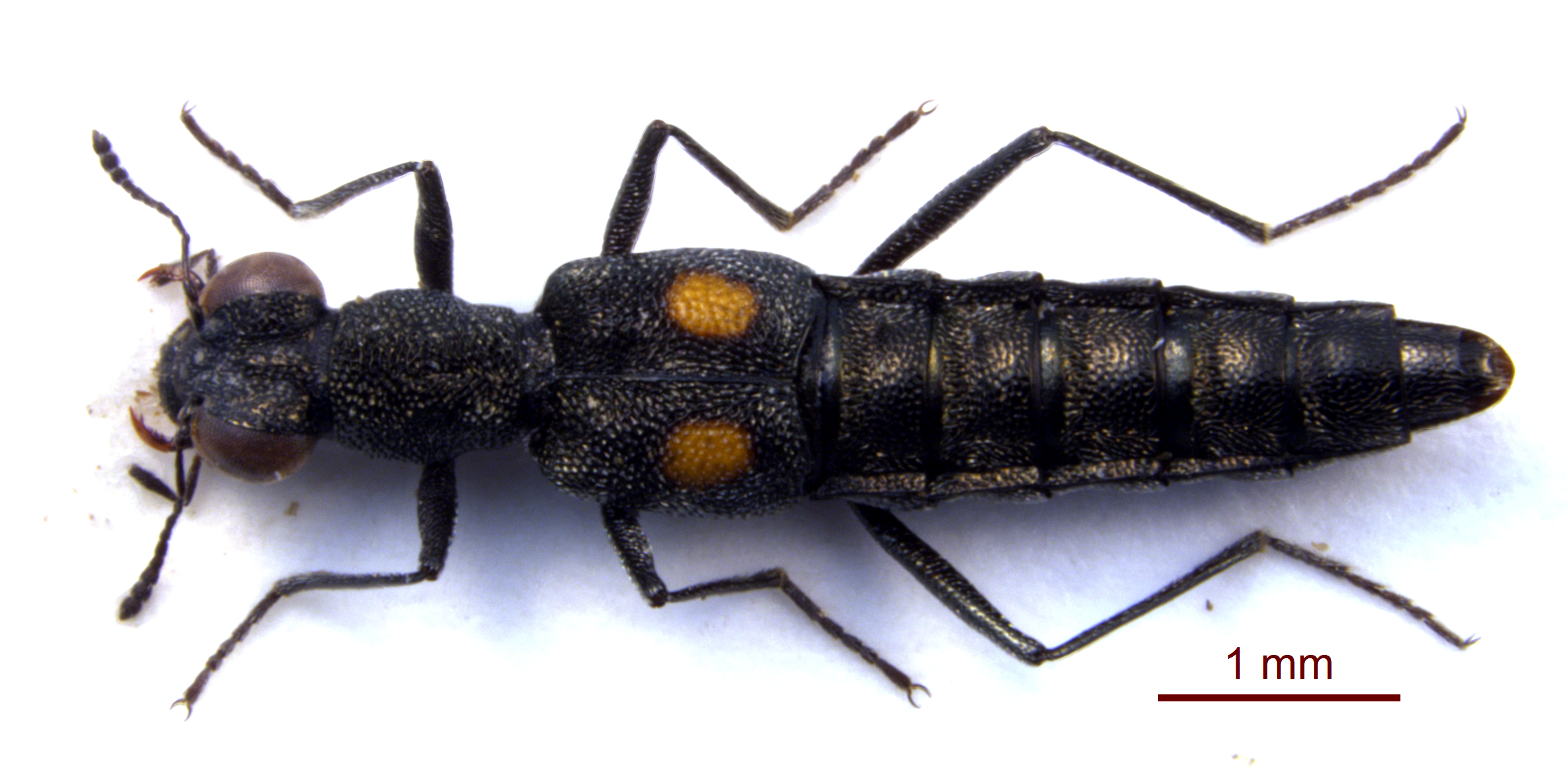
Stenus comma

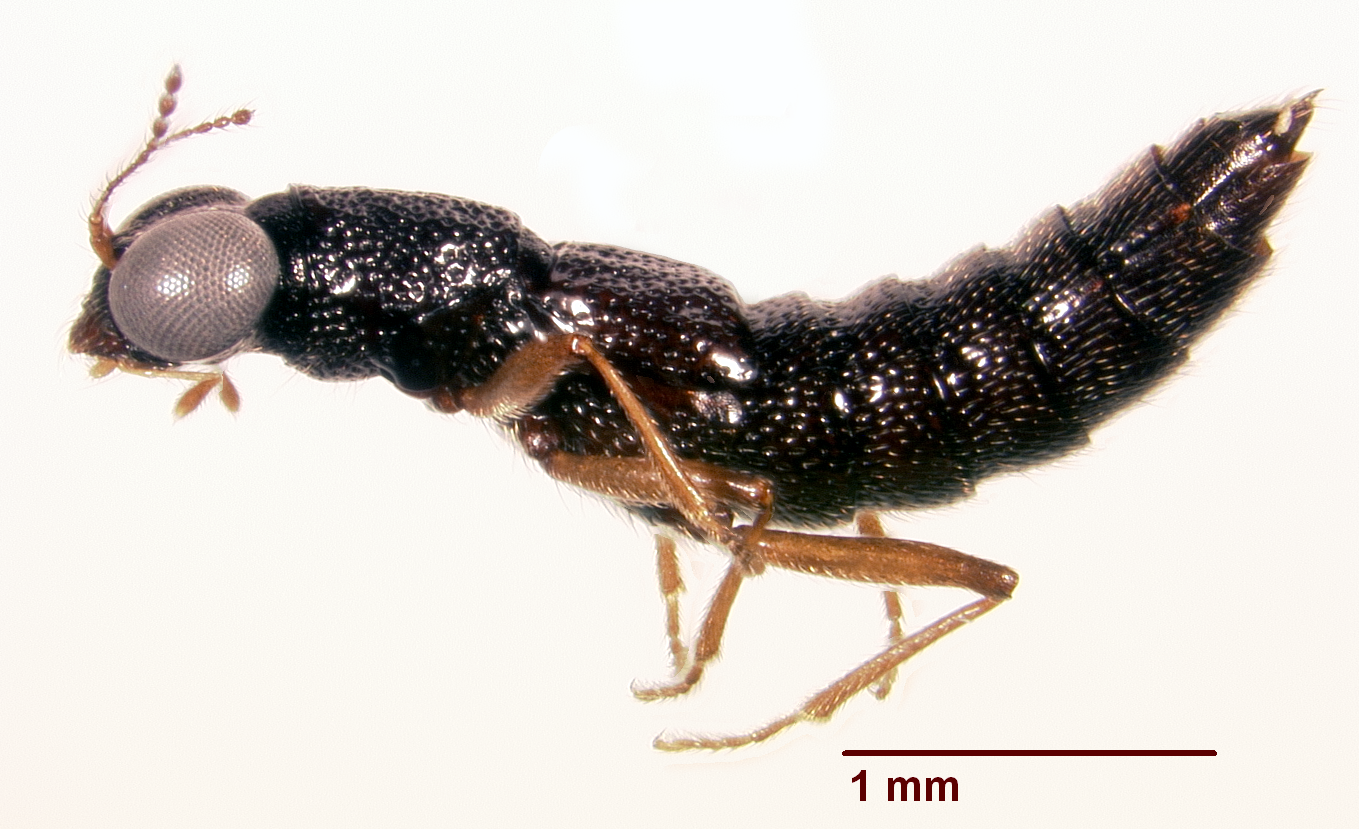
Stenus sp.

Stenus impressus
