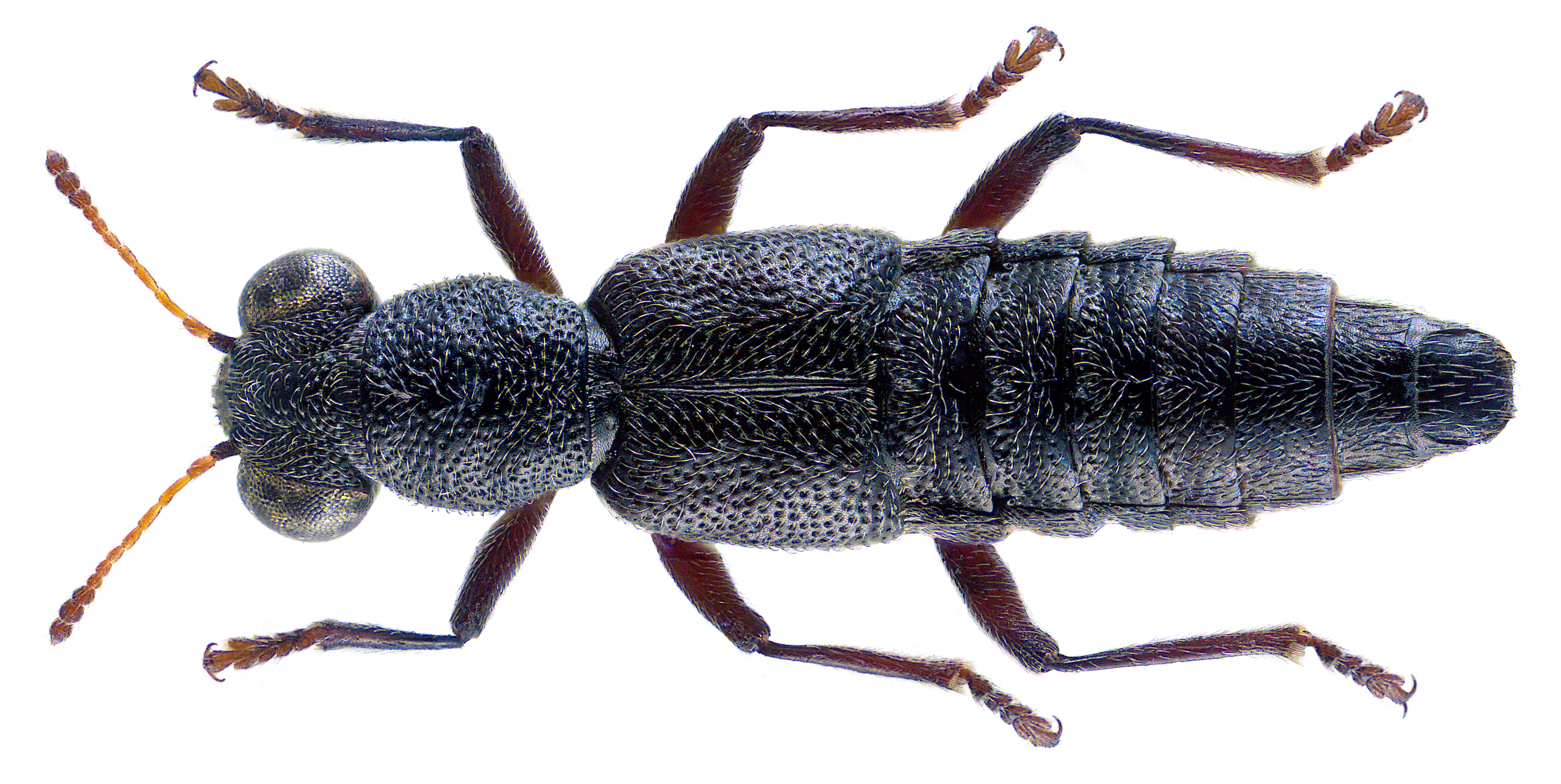
- Stenus bifolveolatus

Scientific classification
- Kingdom: Animalia
- Phylum: Arthropoda
- Class: Insecta
- Order: Coleoptera
- Suborder: Polyphaga
- Infraorder: Staphyliniformia
- Family: Staphylinidae
- Subfamily: Steninae
- Genus: Stenus; Latreille, 1796

= Stenus =

Genus of beetles

Stenus is a genus of semiaquatic rove beetles in the subfamily Steninae, and one of the largest genera in the kingdom Animalia, with some 3100 known species worldwide (only the beetle genus Agrilus is comparable in size). They are predators of Collembola and other small arthropods. Adults have a protrusible labium with a sticky tip used in prey capture. To overcome the rapid escape of Collembola, the labium is protruded at high speed (1-3 ms in Stenus comma) by hemolymph pressure, and immediately withdrawn (withdrawn in 30-40 ms in Stenus comma), pulling the prey within the range of the mandibles. However, the labium tip does not easily stick to prey covered in scales or setae or that have a large body size. Stenus comma is more likely to catch such prey by lunging forward and grabbing them directly with its mandibles rather than using its labium. Stenus species are also known for "skimming" on the water surface using their pygidial gland secretions that act as a surfactant and rapidly propel the beetle fast forward, a phenomenon known as the Marangoni effect. Stenus comma has been seen to achieve a velocity of 0.75 m/s, and to cover a distance of up to 15 m if the secretion is continuous.

== Selected species ==
- Stenus adelops Casey, 1884
- Stenus adspector Maklin, 1852
- Stenus advena (Casey, 1884)
- Stenus agnatus (Casey, 1884)
- Stenus alacer Casey, 1884
- Stenus alpicola Fauvel, 1872
- Stenus alveolatus Casey, 1884
- Stenus amabilis (Casey, 1884)
- Stenus amicus Casey, 1884
- Stenus amplifacatus Benick, 1921
- Stenus angustus Casey, 1884
- Stenus animatus Casey, 1884
- Stenus annularis Erichson, 1840
- Stenus arculus Casey, 1840
- Stenus argus Gravenhorst, 1806
- Stenus arizonae Casey, 1884
- Stenus artus Casey, 1884
- Stenus austini Casey, 1884
- Stenus bakeri Bernhauer, 1910
- Stenus biguttatus (Linnaeus, 1758)
- Stenus bilentigatus Casey, 1884
- Stenus bipunctatus Erichson, 1839
- Stenus biwenxuani Tang & Li, 2013
- Stenus caenicolus Notman, 1919
- Stenus californicus Casey, 1884
- Stenus callosus Erichson, 1840
- Stenus canadensis (Casey, 1884)
- Stenus canaliculatus Gyllenhal, 1827
- Stenus capucinus Boheman, 1858
- Stenus cariniceps Maklin, 1852
- Stenus carinicollis Casey, 1884
- Stenus carolinae Casey, 1884
- Stenus carolinus Bernhauer, 1917
- Stenus chalybeus Boheman, 1858
- Stenus chapini Blackwelder, 1943
- Stenus colon Say, 1834
- Stenus colonus Erichson, 1840
- Stenus comma LeConte 1863
- Stenus convictor Casey, 1884
- Stenus corvus Casey, 1884
- Stenus costalis Casey, 1884
- Stenus croceatus (Casey, 1884)
- Stenus cubanus Blackwelder, 1943
- Stenus cubensis Bernhauer, 1910
- Stenus curtus Casey, 1884
- Stenus delawarensis Casey, 1884
- Stenus dispar Casey, 1884
- Stenus dissentiens Casey, 1884
- Stenus dives Casey, 1884
- Stenus dolosus Casey, 1884
- Stenus dyeri Blackwelder, 1943
- Stenus edax Notman, 1920
- Stenus ellipticus Casey, 1884
- Stenus eriensis Casey, 1884
- Stenus erythropus Melsheimer, 1844
- Stenus exasperatus Benick, 1925
- Stenus exploratus Fall, 1926
- Stenus falli Scheerpeltz, 1933
- Stenus femoratus Say, 1834
- Stenus flavicornis Erichson, 1840
- Stenus floridanus Casey, 1884
- Stenus fraternus (Casey, 1884)
- Stenus frigidus Falls, 1926
- Stenus fulvoguttatus Notman, 1920
- Stenus gemmeus Casey, 1884
- Stenus gibbicollis Sahlberg, 1880
- Stenus gilae Casey, 1884
- Stenus gratiosus Casey, 1884
- Stenus gravidus Casey, 1884
- Stenus haitiensis Blackwelder, 1943
- Stenus hirsutus Casey, 1884
- Stenus hispaniolus Blackwelder, 1943
- Stenus hubbardi Casey, 1884
- Stenus immarginatus Mäklin, 1853
- Stenus incertus Casey, 1884
- Stenus incultus Casey, 1884
- Stenus indigens Casey, 1884
- Stenus ingratus Casey, 1884
- Stenus inornatus Casey, 1884
- Stenus insignis Casey, 1884
- Stenus integer Casey, 1884
- Stenus intrusus Casey, 1884
- Stenus juno (Paykull, 1789)
- Stenus juvencus Casey, 1884
- Stenus laetulus (Casey, 1884)
- Stenus leviceps Casey, 1884
- Stenus limatulus Benick, 1928
- Stenus liupanshanus Tang & Li, 2013
- Stenus luctuosus Casey, 1884
- Stenus luculentus Casey, 1884
- Stenus lugens Casey, 1884
- Stenus lutzi Notman, 1920
- Stenus maritimus Motschulsky, 1845
- Stenus megalops (Casey, 1884)
- Stenus mendax Casey, 1884
- Stenus meridionalis (Casey, 1884)
- Stenus militaris Casey, 1884
- Stenus minor Casey, 1884
- Stenus montanus Casey, 1884
- Stenus monticola Casey, 1884
- Stenus morio Gravenhorst, 1806
- Stenus mundulus Casey, 1884
- Stenus murphyanus Bernhauer, 1917
- Stenus nanus Stephens, 1833
- Stenus neglectus Casey, 1884
- Stenus nimbosus Casey, 1884
- Stenus nitescens (Casey, 1884)
- Stenus noctivagus Casey, 1884
- Stenus obstrusus Casey, 1884
- Stenus occidentalis Casey, 1884
- Stenus odius Blackwelder, 1943
- Stenus pacificus Casey, 1884
- Stenus palposus Zetterstedt, 1838
- Stenus papagonis (Casey, 1884)
- Stenus parallelus Casey, 1884
- Stenus pauper Casey, 1884
- Stenus pauperculus Casey, 1884
- Stenus perexilis Notman, 1920
- Stenus personatus Benick, 1928
- Stenus pertinax (Casey, 1884)
- Stenus pettiti Casey, 1884
- Stenus pinguis (Casey, 1884)
- Stenus placidus Casey, 1884
- Stenus plicipennis (Casey, 1884)
- Stenus pluto Casey, 1884
- Stenus pollens (Casey, 1884)
- Stenus pterobrachys Gemminger & Harold, 1868
- Stenus pudicus Casey, 1884
- Stenus pugetensis Casey, 1884
- Stenus pumilio Erichson, 1839
- Stenus punctatus Erichson, 1840
- Stenus punctiger Casey, 1884
- Stenus ranops Casey, 1884
- Stenus renifer LeConte, 1863
- Stenus retrusus (Casey, 1884)
- Stenus rugifer Casey, 1884
- Stenus sayi (Casey, 1884)
- Stenus scabiosus Casey, 1884
- Stenus schwarzi Casey, 1884
- Stenus sculptilis Casey, 1884
- Stenus sectator Casey, 1884
- Stenus sectilifer Casey, 1884
- Stenus semicolon LeConte, 1863
- Stenus shoshonis Casey, 1884
- Stenus similiatus Blatchley, 1910
- Stenus simplex Casey, 1884
- Stenus solutus Erichson 1840
- Stenus sphaerops Casey, 1884
- Stenus strangulatus Casey, 1884
- Stenus stygicus Say, 1834
- Stenus subtilis Casey, 1884
- Stenus tacomae Casey, 1884
- Stenus tahoensis Casey,1884
- Stenus tarsalis Ljungh, 1804
- Stenus tenuis Casey, 1884
- Stenus terricola Casey, 1884
- Stenus teter Notman, 1920
- Stenus texanus Casey, 1884
- Stenus torus Benick, 1925
- Stenus trajectus (Casey, 1884)
- Stenus tristis Casey, 1884
- Stenus tuberculatus Casey, 1884
- Stenus utenis Casey, 1884
- Stenus vacuus Casey, 1884
- Stenus venustus Casey, 1884
- Stenus verticosus Casey, 1884
- Stenus vespertinus Casey, 1884
- Stenus vestalis Casey, 1884
- Stenus vexatus Casey, 1884
- Stenus vicinus Casey, 1884
- Stenus villosus Casey, 1884
- Stenus vinnulus Casey, 1884
- Stenus vista Sanderson, 1946
- Stenus zunicus Casey, 1884
