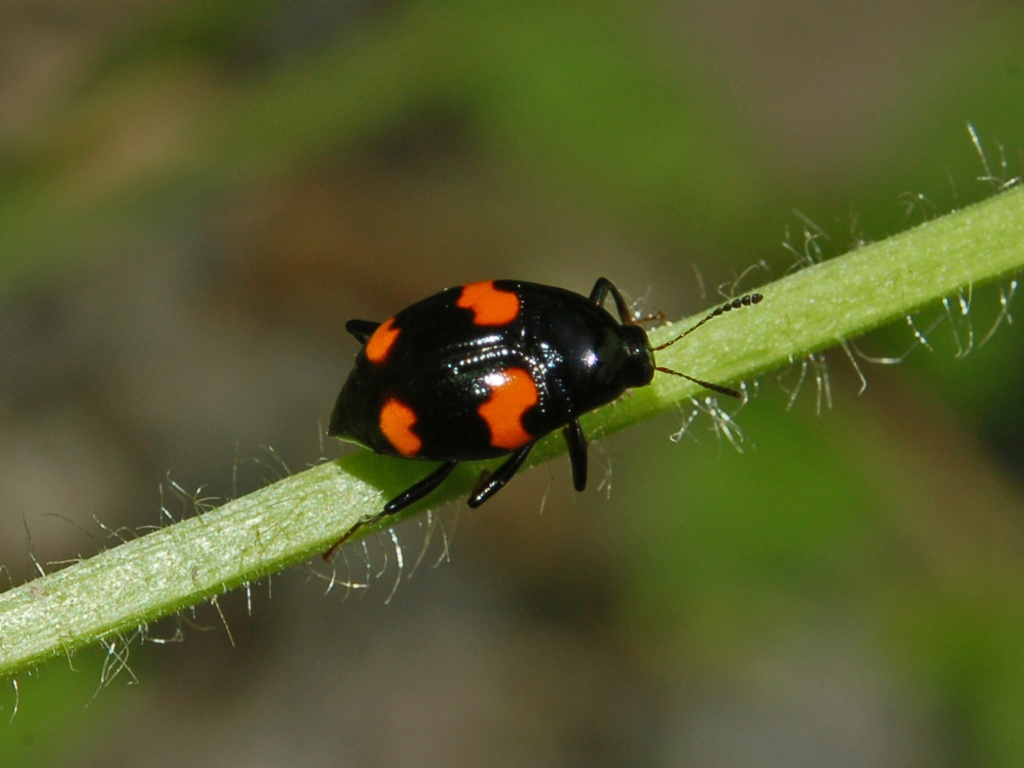
- Scaphidium quadrimaculatum. Upperside

Scientific classification
- Kingdom: Animalia
- Phylum: Arthropoda
- Clade: Pancrustacea
- Class: Insecta
- Order: Coleoptera
- Suborder: Polyphaga
- Infraorder: Staphyliniformia
- Family: Staphylinidae
- Genus: Scaphidium
- Species: S. quadrimaculatum

Binomial name
- Scaphidium quadrimaculatum Olivier, 1790

= Scaphidium quadrimaculatum =

Species of beetle

Scaphidium quadrimaculatum, common name orange-spotted scaphidium or shining fungus beetle, is a species of beetles belonging to the family Staphylinidae subfamily Scaphidiinae.

== Distribution ==
These quite uncommon beetles are present in most of Europe, in North Africa and in the Near East.

== Description ==
Scaphidium quadrimaculatum can reach a length of 5–6 millimetres (0.20–0.24 in). These small beetles have a broad and oval-shaped body. They are completely shiny black, with four irregular red spots on elytra. Thorax is somewhat coarctate on each side behind. Elytra are widely punctured, while tibiae are striated.

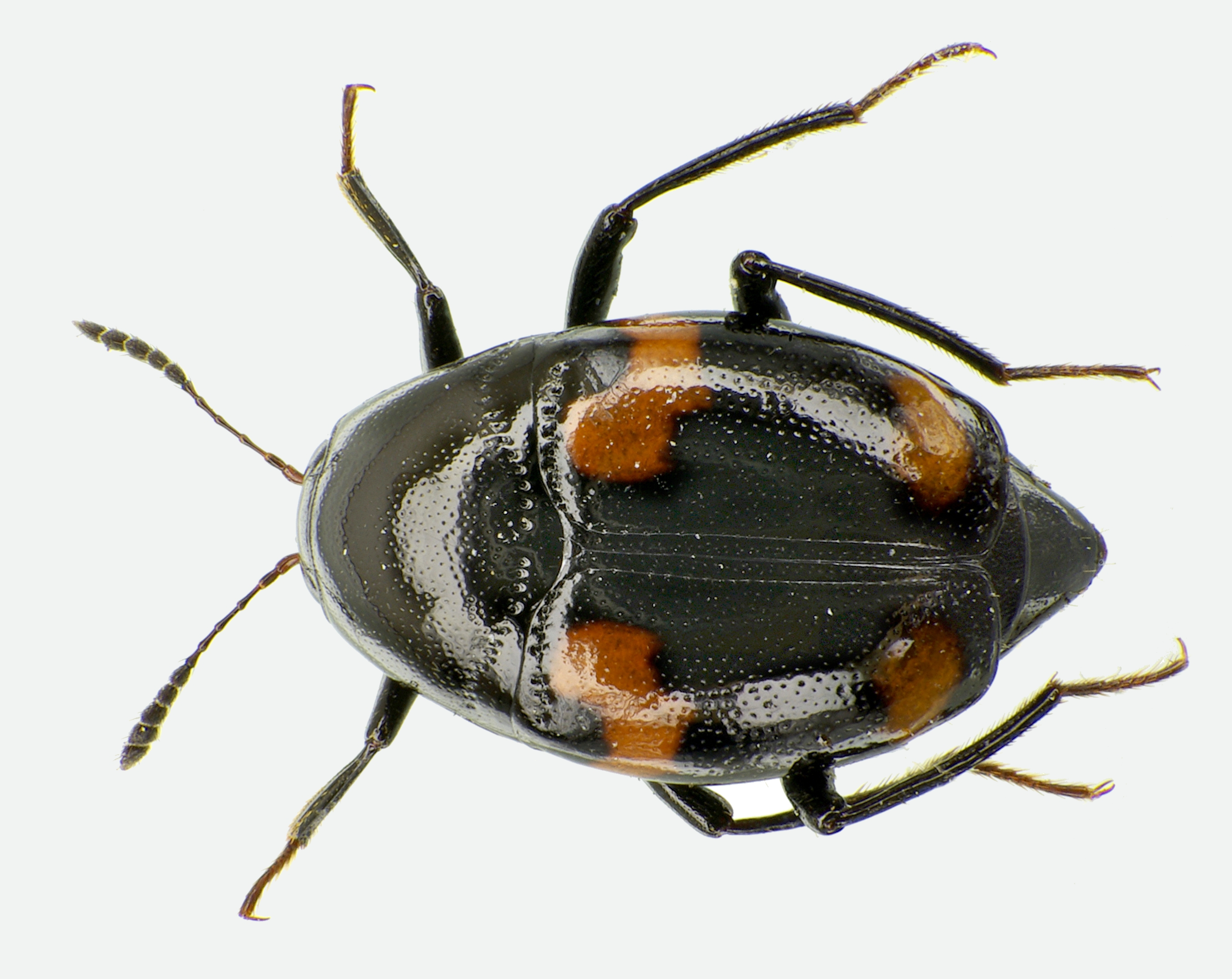
Upperside

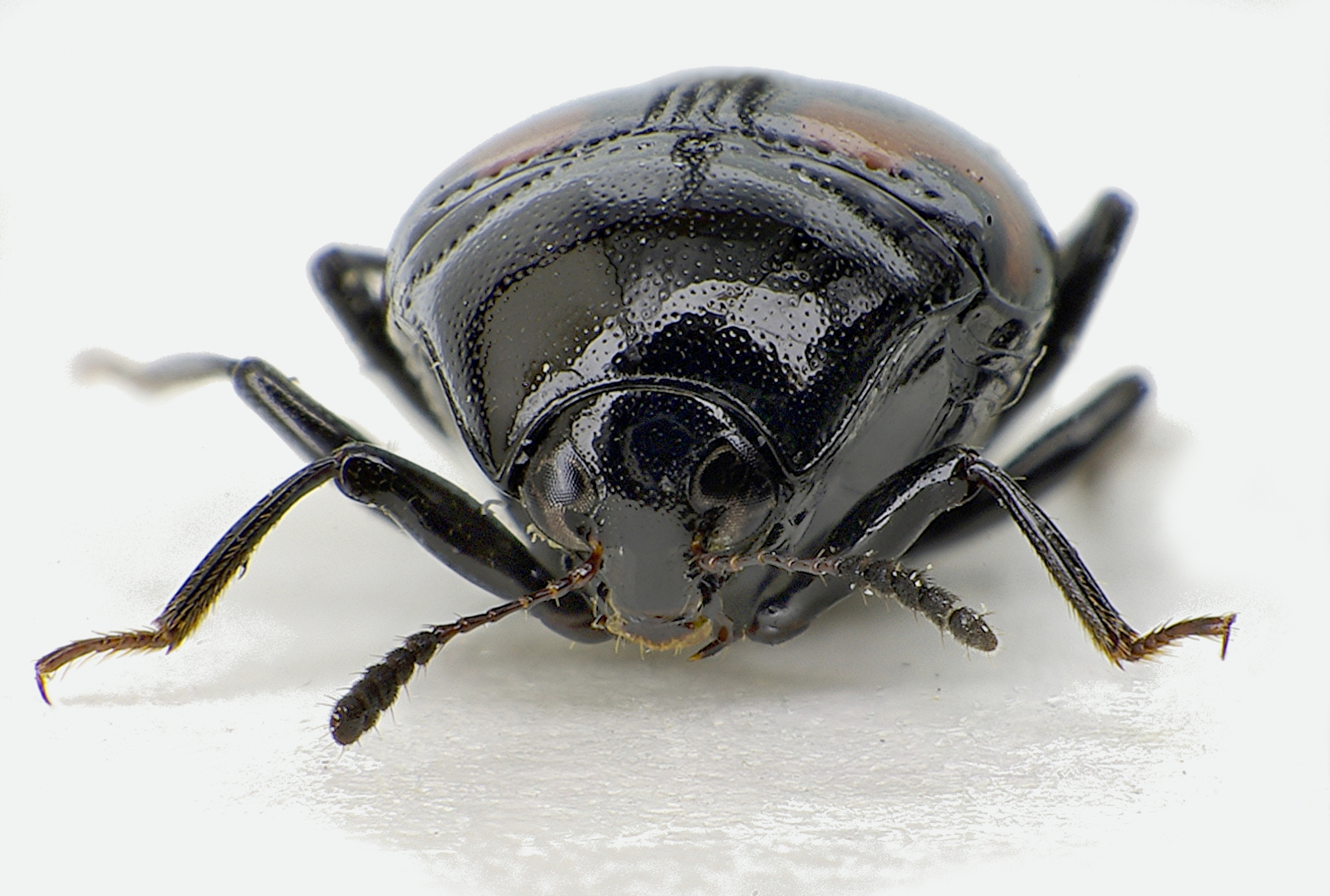
Front

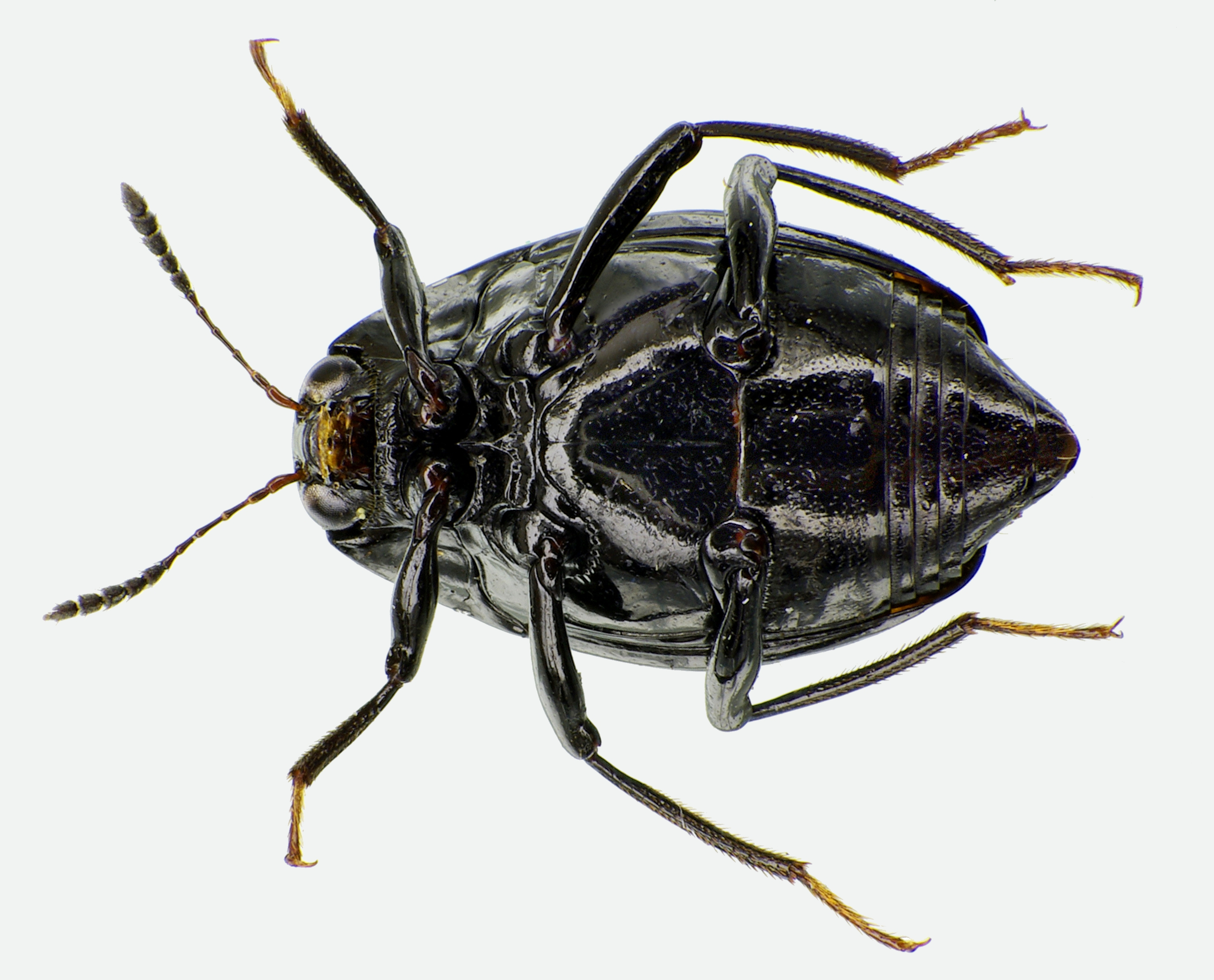
Underside

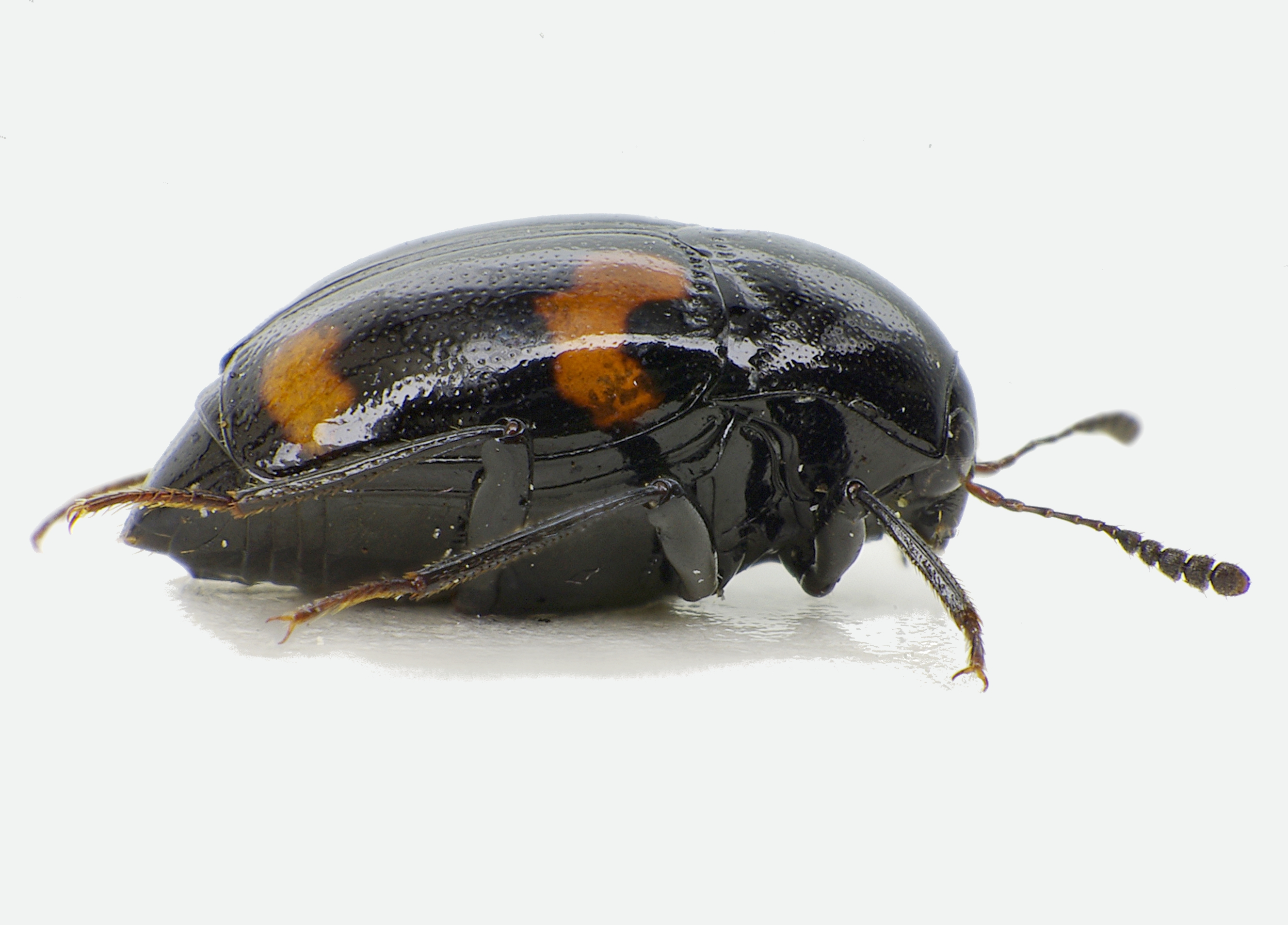
Side view

== Biology ==
Adults can mostly be encountered from April through August feeding on various species of fungi, especially bracket fungi.

== Gallery ==
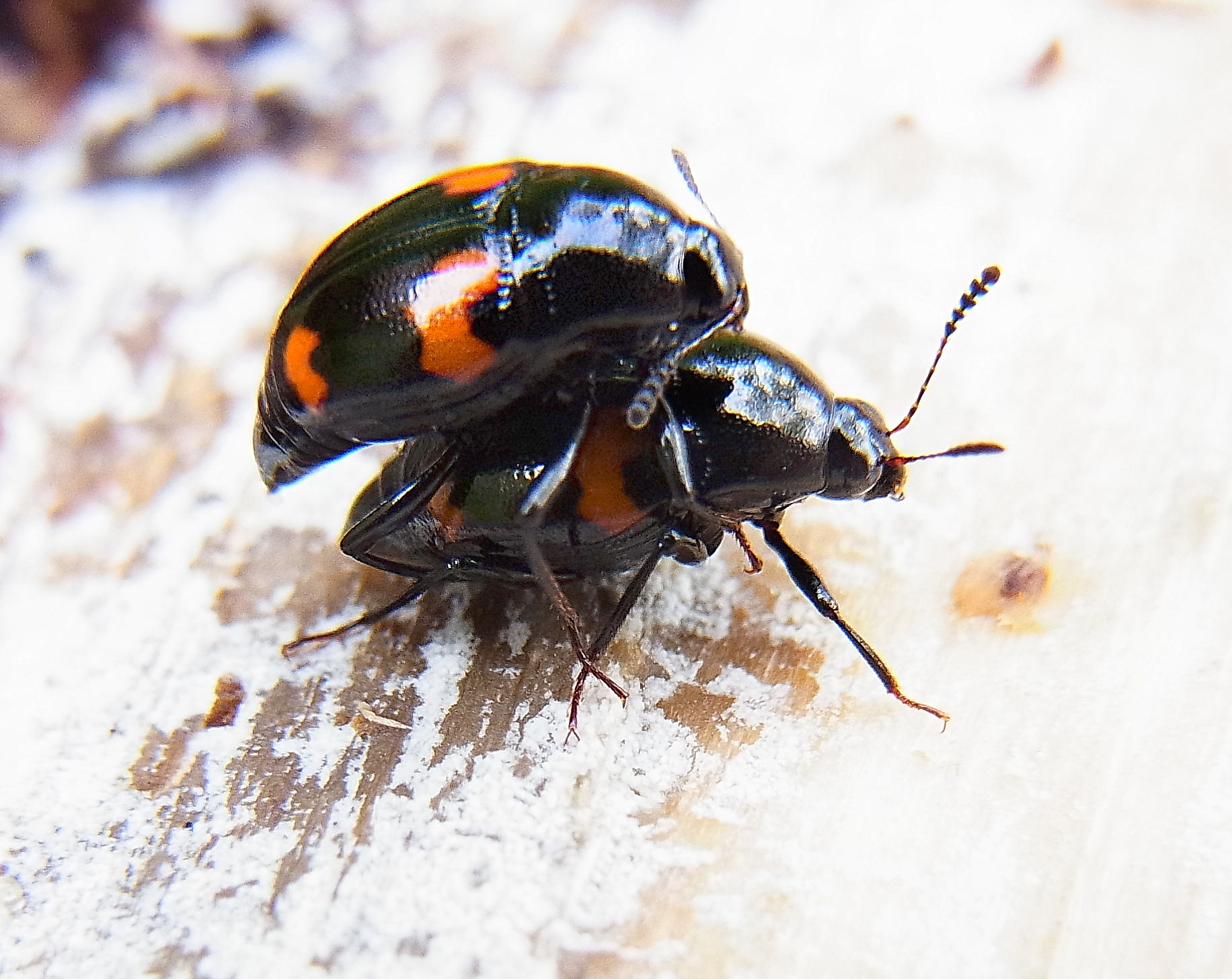
Mating couple

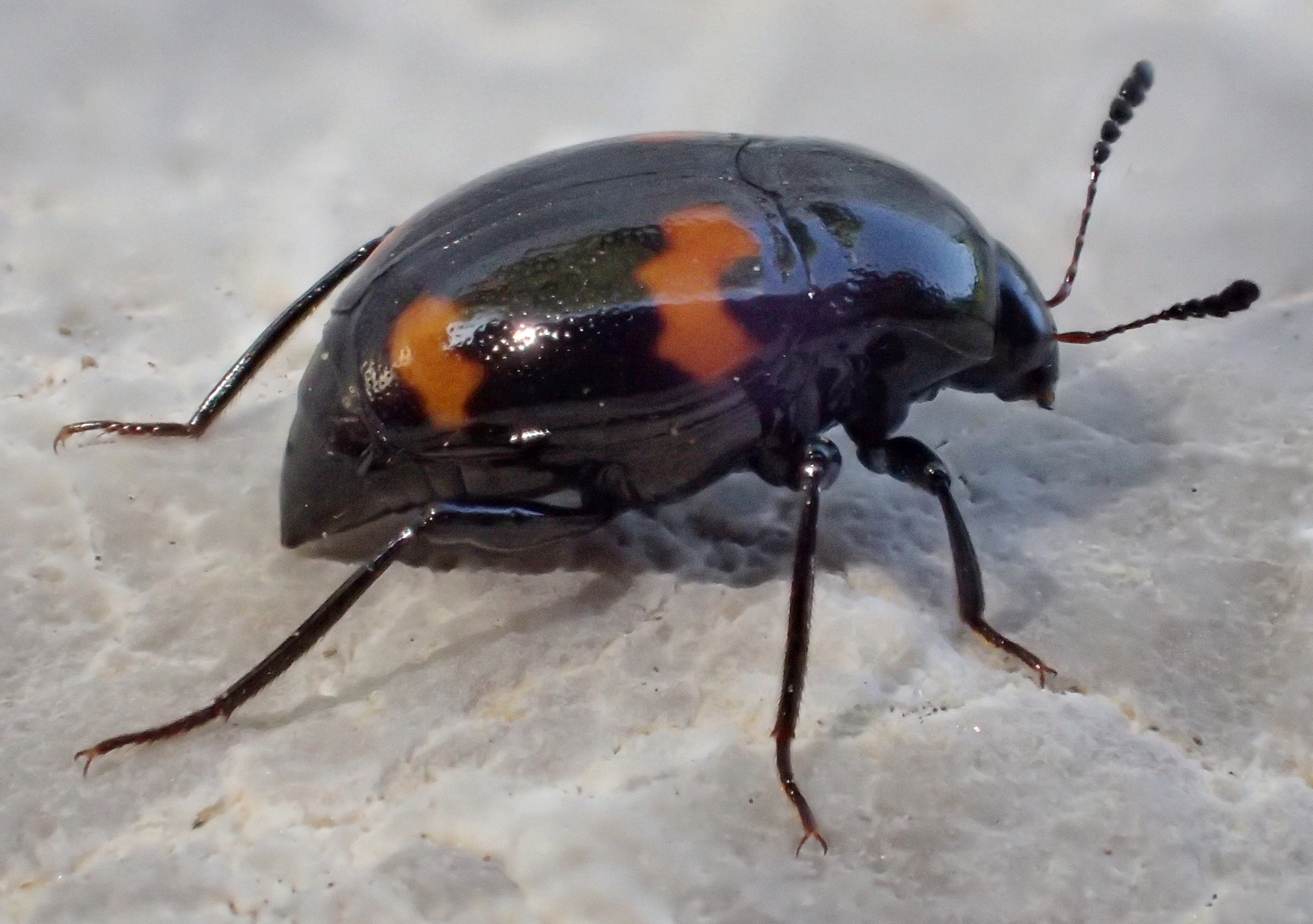
Side view

Clip of S. quadrimaculatum on beech

== Bibliography ==
- Karl Wilhelm Harde, Frantisek Severa und Edwin Möhn: Der Kosmos Käferführer: Die mitteleuropäischen Käfer. Franckh-Kosmos Verlags-GmbH & Co KG, Stuttgart 2000, ISBN 3-440-06959-1.
- A. Horion: Faunistik der mitteleuropäischen Käfer Band II: Palpicornia - Staphylinoidea, Vittorio Klostermann, Frankfurt am Main, 1949.
- Edmund Reitter: Fauna Germanica – Die Käfer des Deutschen Reiches. 5 Bände, Stuttgart K. G. Lutz 1908–1916, Digitale Bibliothek Band 134, Directmedia Publishing GmbH, Berlin 2006, ISBN 3-898-53534-7
