= Toxidium =

Scientific classification
- Kingdom: Animalia
- Phylum: Arthropoda
- Class: Insecta
- Order: Coleoptera
- Suborder: Polyphaga
- Infraorder: Staphyliniformia
- Family: Staphylinidae
- Subfamily: Scaphidiinae
- Genus: Toxidium; LeConte, 1860

Genus of beetles

Toxidium is a genus of beetles belonging to the family Staphylinidae.

== Selected species ==
- Toxidium acuminatum Pic, 1920
- Toxidium brigadeirense von Groll, 2025
- Toxidium distortum von Groll, 2025
- Toxidium fleche von Groll, 2025
- Toxidium inusitatum von Groll, 2025
- Toxidium robustum Pic, 1930
- Toxidium scalenum von Groll, 2025
- Toxidium speratum von Groll, 2025
- Toxidium ultimum von Groll, 2025
