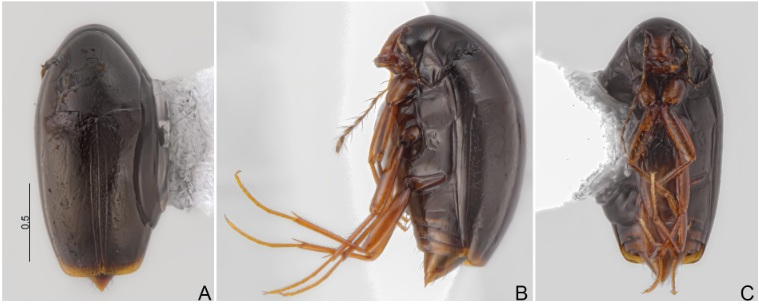

Scientific classification
- Domain: Eukaryota
- Kingdom: Animalia
- Phylum: Arthropoda
- Class: Insecta
- Order: Coleoptera
- Suborder: Polyphaga
- Infraorder: Staphyliniformia
- Family: Staphylinidae
- Genus: Toxidium
- Species: T. ultimum

Binomial name
- Toxidium ultimum von Groll, 2025

= Toxidium ultimum =

Species of beetle

Toxidium ultimum is a species of beetle in the family Staphylinidae. This species is found in south-eastern Brazil (Minas Gerais).

Adults reach a length of about 1.56–1.70 mm and have a dark brown body. The apex of the elytra is yellow-ochreous.

Adults have been collected from an Inonotus species located on a tree in front of an avenue.

== Etymology ==
The species epithet is a Latin word meaning ‘the last one’, referring both to it being the last species described in the author's manuscript and the final specimen collected and dissected for the author's project.
