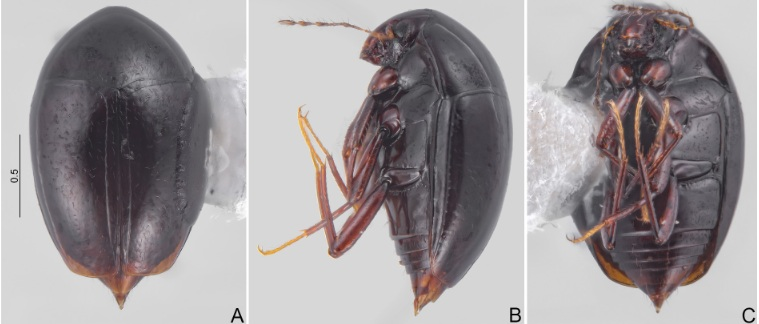

Scientific classification
- Domain: Eukaryota
- Kingdom: Animalia
- Phylum: Arthropoda
- Class: Insecta
- Order: Coleoptera
- Suborder: Polyphaga
- Infraorder: Staphyliniformia
- Family: Staphylinidae
- Genus: Alexidia
- Species: A. solitaria

Binomial name
- Alexidia solitaria von Groll, 2025

= Alexidia solitaria =

Species of beetle

Alexidia solitaria is a species of beetle of the Staphylinidae family. This species is found in south-eastern Brazil (Minas Gerais).

Adults reach a length of about 1.74 mm and have a dark wine-brown colour.

Adults have been collected from an undetermined young orange-white fungus/myxomycete on a decaying tree.

== Etymology ==
The species epithet is a Latin word meaning ‘alone’, because the single known specimen was collected alone.
