= Alexidia =

Scientific classification
- Kingdom: Animalia
- Phylum: Arthropoda
- Class: Insecta
- Order: Coleoptera
- Suborder: Polyphaga
- Infraorder: Staphyliniformia
- Family: Staphylinidae
- Subfamily: Scaphidiinae
- Genus: Alexidia; Reitter, 1880

Genus of beetles

Alexidia is a genus of beetles belonging to the family Staphylinidae.

== Species ==
- Alexidia carltoni Löbl & Leschen, 2003
- Alexidia convivalis von Groll, 2025
- Alexidia dybasi Löbl & Leschen, 2003
- Alexidia plaumanni Löbl & Leschen, 2003
- Alexidia rogenhoferi Reitter, 1880
- Alexidia solitaria von Groll, 2025
