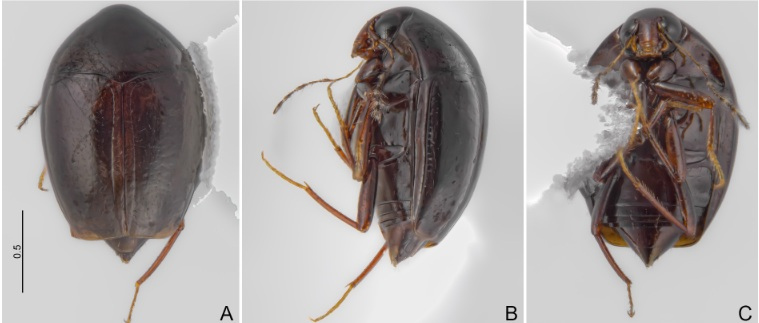

Scientific classification
- Domain: Eukaryota
- Kingdom: Animalia
- Phylum: Arthropoda
- Class: Insecta
- Order: Coleoptera
- Suborder: Polyphaga
- Infraorder: Staphyliniformia
- Family: Staphylinidae
- Genus: Alexidia
- Species: A. convivalis

Binomial name
- Alexidia convivalis von Groll, 2025

= Alexidia convivalis =

Species of beetle

Alexidia convivalis is a species of beetle of the Staphylinidae family. This species is found in south-eastern Brazil (Minas Gerais).

Adults reach a length of about 1.41–1.55 mm and have a brown to dark brown body, with the edges of some sclerites reddish.

Adults have been collected from Ceratiomyxa fruticulosa on a fallen Pinus tree.

== Etymology ==
The species epithet is a Latin word meaning ‘feast’, ‘banquet’, because of the great feast they were having, all the time specimens were collected among other Alexidia and many Baeocera species.
