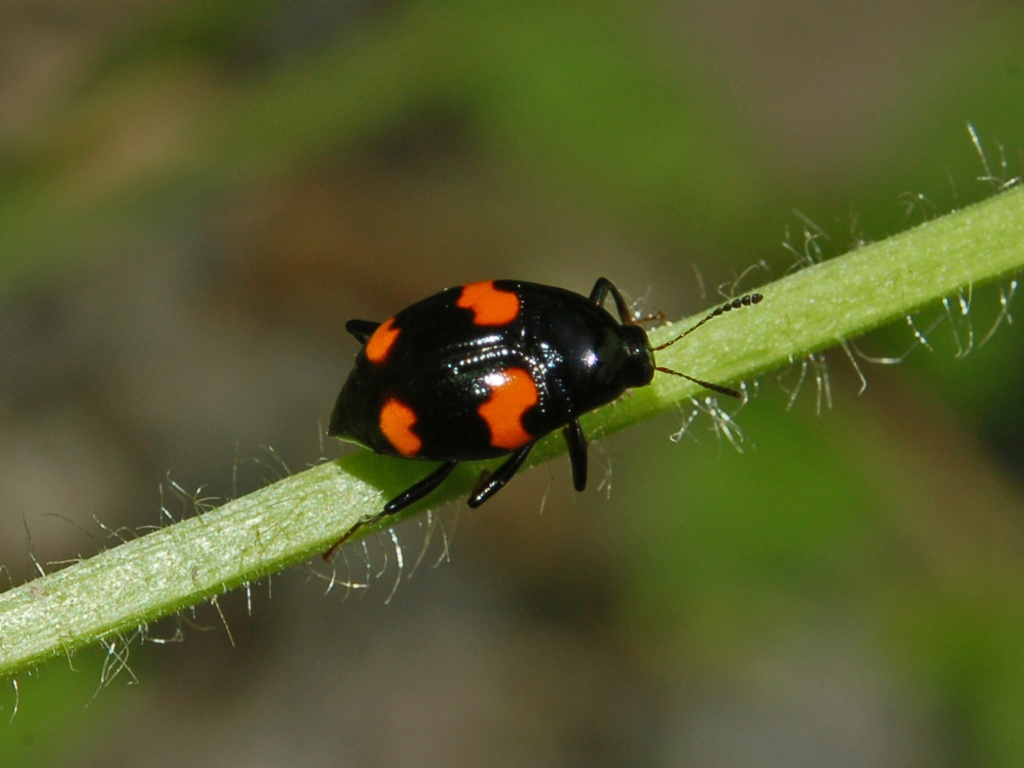
- Scaphidium quadrimaculatum

Scientific classification
- Domain: Eukaryota
- Kingdom: Animalia
- Phylum: Arthropoda
- Class: Insecta
- Order: Coleoptera
- Suborder: Polyphaga
- Infraorder: Staphyliniformia
- Family: Staphylinidae
- Subfamily: Scaphidiinae
- Genus: Scaphidium; Olivier, 1790

Synonyms
- Ascaphidium Pic, 1915a; Cribroscaphium Pic, 1920b; Hemiscaphium Achard, 1922a; Hyposcaphidium Achard, 1922a; Isoscaphium Achard, 1922a; Pachyscaphidium Achard, 1922a; Scaphidiolum Achard, 1922a; Scaphidopsis Achard, 1922a; Falsoascaphidium Pic, 1923; Parascaphium Achard, 1923

= Scaphidium =

Genus of beetles

Scaphidium is a genus of shining fungus beetles belonging to the family Staphylinidae, subfamily Scaphidiinae.

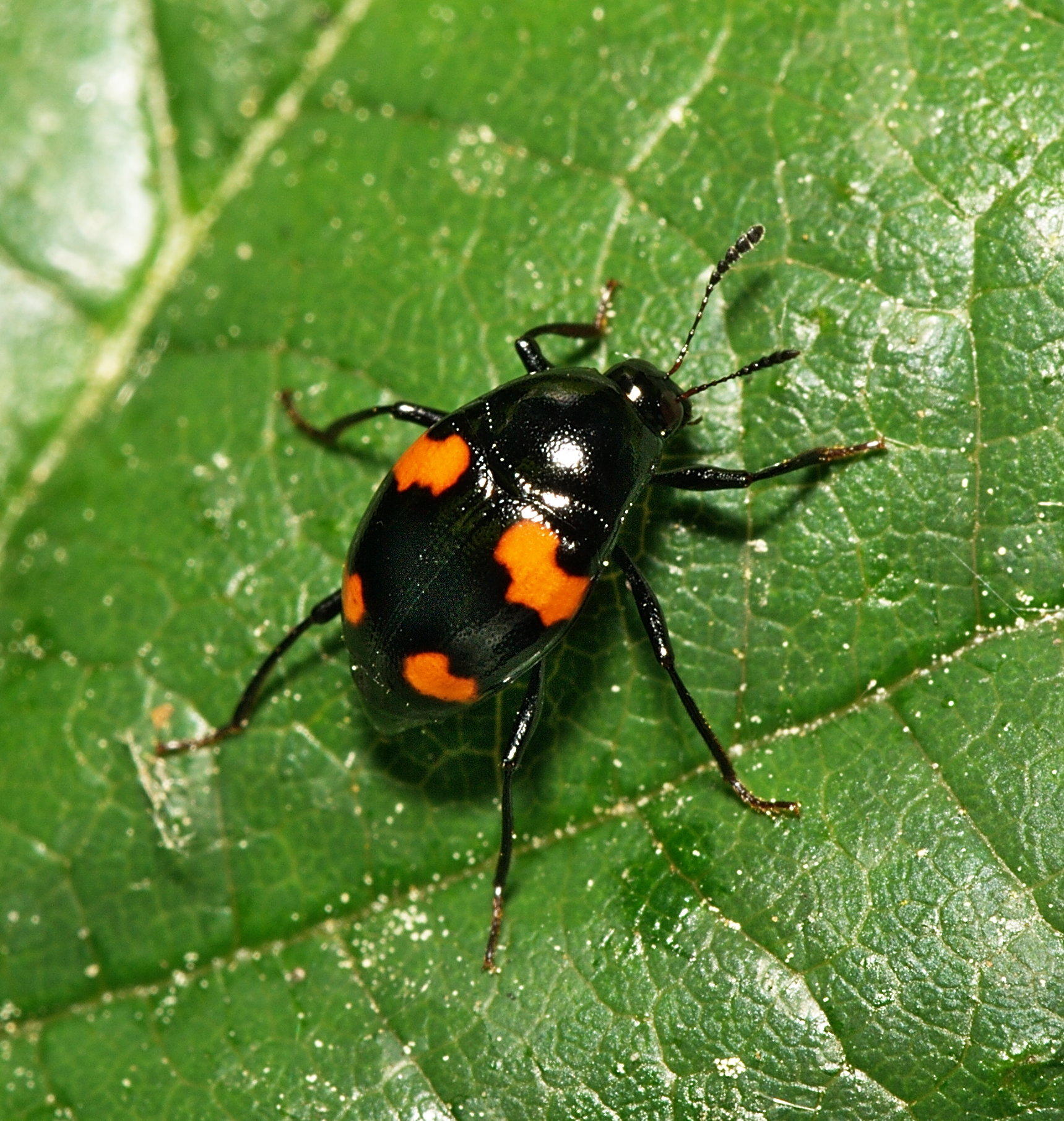
Scaphidium quadrimaculatum

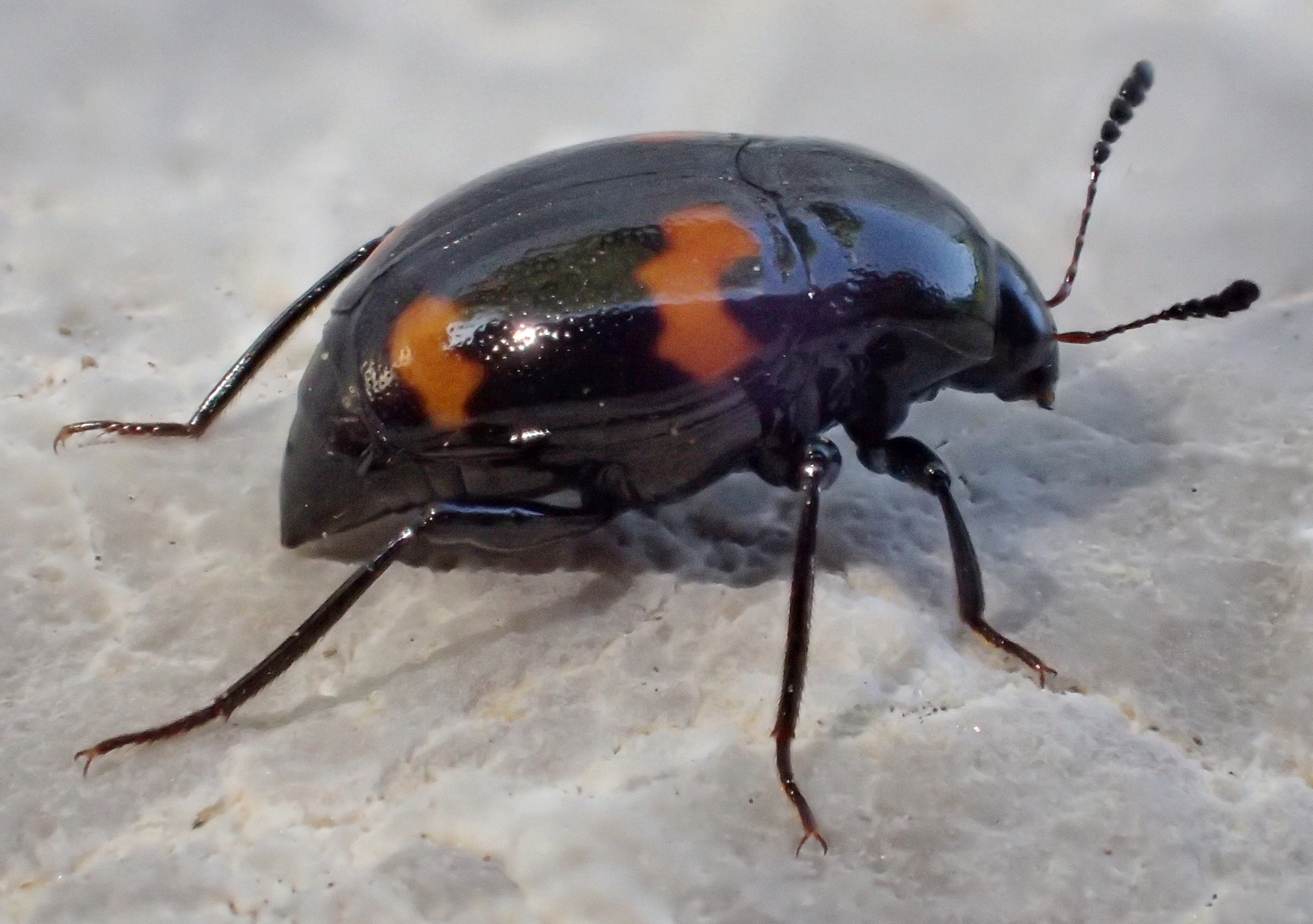
Scaphidium quadrimaculatum, Greece

== Species ==
These 62 species belong to the genus Scaphidium:

- Scaphidium ahrensi Tu & Tang^{g}
- Scaphidium amurense Solsky, 1871
- Scaphidium bayibin i Tang et al., 2014
- Scaphidium becvari Löbl, 1999
- Scaphidium biwenxuani He, Tang & Li, 2008^{g}
- Scaphidium castanicolor Csiki, 1924^{g}
- Scaphidium comes Loebl, 1968^{g}
- Scaphidium connexum Tang et al., 2014
- Scaphidium crypticum Tang et al., 2014
- Scaphidium delatouchei Achard, 1920^{g}
- Scaphidium deletum Heer, 1847 †
- Scaphidium direptum Tang & Li, 2010^{g}
- Scaphidium egregium Achard, 1922
- Scaphidium fainanense Pic, 1915^{g}
- Scaphidium flavofasciatum Miwa & Mitono, 1943
- Scaphidium flavomaculatum Miwa & Nitono, 1943^{g}
- Scaphidium formosanum Pic, 1915^{g}
- Scaphidium fukiense Pic, 1954^{g}
- Scaphidium grande Gestro, 1880^{g}
- Scaphidium inexspectatum Löbl, 1999
- Scaphidium inflexitibiale Tang & Li, 2010
- Scaphidium jinmingi Tang et al., 2014
- Scaphidium jizuense Löbl, 1999
- Scaphidium klapperichi Pic, 1954^{g}
- Scaphidium kubani Löbl, 1999
- Scaphidium kurbatovi Löbl, 1999
- Scaphidium laxum Tang & Li, 2010
- Scaphidium liui Tang & Li, 2010
- Scaphidium longipenne Achard, 1921^{g}
- Scaphidium longum Tang & Li, 2010
- Scaphidium lunare Löbl, 1999
- Scaphidium lunatum Motschulsky, 1859
- Scaphidium montivagum Shirozu & Morimoto, 1963
- Scaphidium nigrocinctulum Oberthur, 1884^{g}
- Scaphidium obliteratum LeConte, 1860^{g}
- Scaphidium ornatum Casey
- Scaphidium piceum Melsheimer, 1844^{g b}
- Scaphidium pusillum Gyllenhal, 1808^{g}
- Scaphidium quadriguttatum Melsheimer^{i c g b}
- Scaphidium quadrimaculatum Olivier, 1790^{g}
- Scaphidium quinquemaculatum Pic, 1915^{g}
- Scaphidium reni Tang & Li, 2010
- Scaphidium robustum Tang et al., 2014
- Scaphidium sauteri Miwa & Nitono, 1943^{g}
- Scaphidium schuelkei Löbl, 1999
- Scaphidium shibatai Kimura, 1987^{g}
- Scaphidium shrakii Miwa & Nitono, 1943^{g}
- Scaphidium sichuanum Löbl, 1999
- Scaphidium sinense Pic, 1954^{g}
- Scaphidium sinuatum Csiki, 1924^{g}
- Scaphidium solukhumbu^{g}
- Scaphidium spinatum Tang & Li, 2010
- Scaphidium stigmatinotum Loebl, 1999^{g}
- Scaphidium takahashii Miwa & Nitono, 1943^{g}
- Scaphidium variegatum Pic, 1915^{g}
- Scaphidium varifasciatum Tang et al., 2014
- Scaphidium vernicatum Pic, 1954^{g}
- Scaphidium vicinum Pic, 1915^{g}
- Scaphidium wuyongxiangi He, Tang & Li, 2008^{g}
- Scaphidium yeti ^{g}
- Scaphidium yunnanum Fairmaire, 1886
- Scaphidium yuzhizhoui Tang, Tu & Li^{g}

Data sources: i = ITIS, c = Catalogue of Life, g = GBIF, b = Bugguide.net
