= Scaphidium quadriguttatum =

Scientific classification
- Domain: Eukaryota
- Kingdom: Animalia
- Phylum: Arthropoda
- Class: Insecta
- Order: Coleoptera
- Suborder: Polyphaga
- Infraorder: Staphyliniformia
- Family: Staphylinidae
- Genus: Scaphidium
- Species: S. quadriguttatum

Binomial name
- Scaphidium quadriguttatum Melsheimer

Species of beetle

Scaphidium quadriguttatum is a species of shining fungus beetle in the family Staphylinidae.
