= Amalocera =

Scientific classification
- Kingdom: Animalia
- Phylum: Arthropoda
- Class: Insecta
- Order: Coleoptera
- Suborder: Polyphaga
- Infraorder: Staphyliniformia
- Family: Staphylinidae
- Subfamily: Scaphidiinae
- Genus: Amalocera; Erichson, 1845

Genus of beetles

Amalocera is a genus of beetles belonging to the family Staphylinidae.

== Species ==
- Amalocera basipennis Löbl, 1974
- Amalocera dentifera Löbl, 1974
- Amalocera paulistana Achard, 1922
- Amalocera picta Erichson, 1845
- Amalocera tibialis Löbl, 1974
