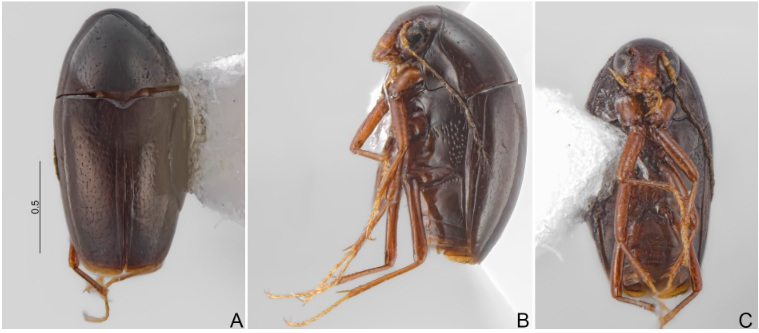

Scientific classification
- Domain: Eukaryota
- Kingdom: Animalia
- Phylum: Arthropoda
- Class: Insecta
- Order: Coleoptera
- Suborder: Polyphaga
- Infraorder: Staphyliniformia
- Family: Staphylinidae
- Genus: Toxidium
- Species: T. inusitatum

Binomial name
- Toxidium inusitatum von Groll, 2025

= Toxidium inusitatum =

Species of beetle

Toxidium inusitatum is a species of beetle in the family Staphylinidae. This species is found in south-eastern Brazil (Minas Gerais).

Adults reach a length of about 1.45 mm and have a brown body.

Adults have been collected from a small rotten log, covered with undetermined hyphae.

== Etymology ==
The species epithet is a Latin word meaning ‘unusual’, due to the distinct aedeagus shape.
