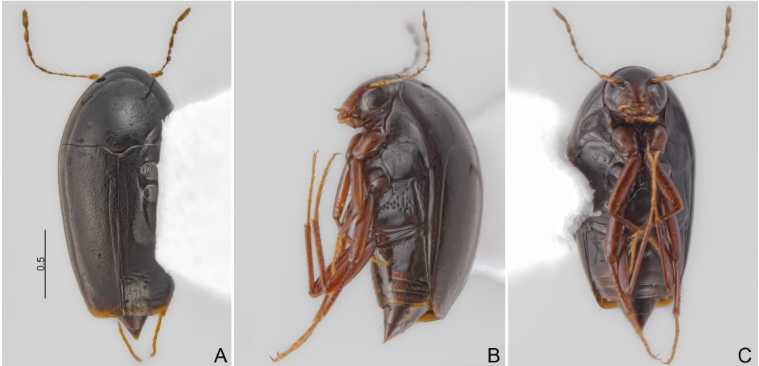

Scientific classification
- Domain: Eukaryota
- Kingdom: Animalia
- Phylum: Arthropoda
- Class: Insecta
- Order: Coleoptera
- Suborder: Polyphaga
- Infraorder: Staphyliniformia
- Family: Staphylinidae
- Genus: Toxidium
- Species: T. fleche

Binomial name
- Toxidium fleche von Groll, 2025

= Toxidium fleche =

Species of beetle

Toxidium fleche is a species of beetle of the family Staphylinidae. This species is found in south-eastern Brazil (Minas Gerais).

Adults reach a length of about 1.90 mm and have a dark brown body.

Adults have been collected from an undetermined crust/resupinate fungus.

== Etymology ==
The species name is a French noun in apposition, meaning ‘arrow’, due to the arrow-shaped sclerite of the internal sac.
