= Alexidia rogenhoferi =

Scientific classification
- Kingdom: Animalia
- Phylum: Arthropoda
- Class: Insecta
- Order: Coleoptera
- Suborder: Polyphaga
- Infraorder: Staphyliniformia
- Family: Staphylinidae
- Genus: Alexidia
- Species: A. rogenhoferi

Binomial name
- Alexidia rogenhoferi Reitter, 1880

Species of beetle

Alexidia rogenhoferi is a species of beetle in the family Staphylinidae. This species is found in Colombia.

Adults reach a length of about 1.45 mm and have a light reddish-brown colour.
