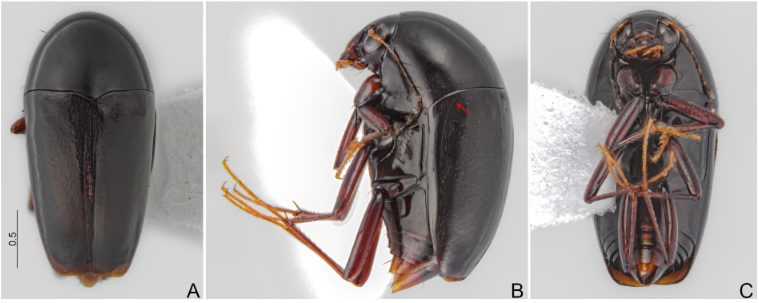

Scientific classification
- Kingdom: Animalia
- Phylum: Arthropoda
- Class: Insecta
- Order: Coleoptera
- Suborder: Polyphaga
- Infraorder: Staphyliniformia
- Family: Staphylinidae
- Genus: Toxidium
- Species: T. brigadeirense

Binomial name
- Toxidium brigadeirense von Groll, 2025

= Toxidium brigadeirense =

Species of beetle

Toxidium brigadeirense is a species of beetle in the family Staphylinidae. This species is found in south-eastern Brazil (Minas Gerais).

Adults reach a length of about 2.18–2.33 mm and have a brown body with some dark reddish areas.

Adults have been collected from undetermined crust/resupinate fungi on logs.

== Etymology ==
The species epithet is derived from the name of the type locality, Parque Estadual da Serra do Brigadeiro.
