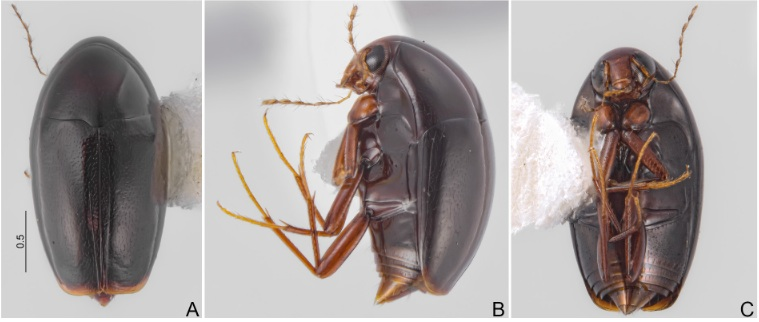

Scientific classification
- Domain: Eukaryota
- Kingdom: Animalia
- Phylum: Arthropoda
- Class: Insecta
- Order: Coleoptera
- Suborder: Polyphaga
- Infraorder: Staphyliniformia
- Family: Staphylinidae
- Genus: Toxidium
- Species: T. speratum

Binomial name
- Toxidium speratum von Groll, 2025

= Toxidium speratum =

Species of beetle

Toxidium speratum is a species of beetle in the family Staphylinidae. This species is found in south-eastern Brazil (Minas Gerais).

Adults reach a length of about 2.08–2.25 mm and have a dark reddish-brown body.

Adults have been collected from a Hyphodontia species.

== Etymology ==
The species epithet is a Latin word meaning ‘hope’, because after collecting some specimens on one of the first field trips during the author's doctorate, she always returned to that same trunk hoping to collect more specimens, but never did.
