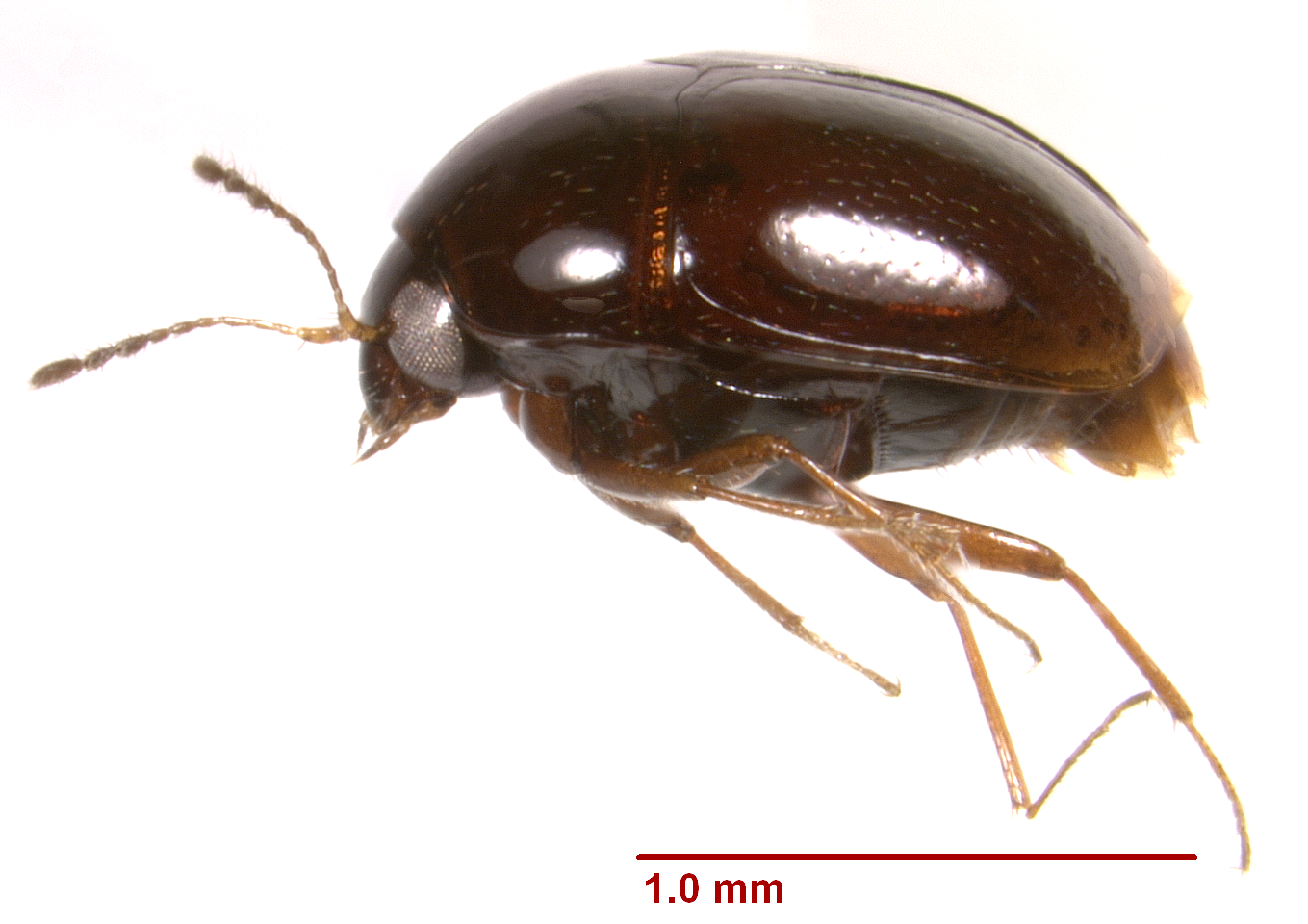
- Baeocera sp.

Scientific classification
- Kingdom: Animalia
- Phylum: Arthropoda
- Clade: Pancrustacea
- Class: Insecta
- Order: Coleoptera
- Suborder: Polyphaga
- Infraorder: Staphyliniformia
- Family: Staphylinidae
- Subfamily: Scaphidiinae; Latreille 1807

Genera
- See text

= Scaphidiinae =

Subfamily of beetles

Scaphidiinae is a subfamily of Staphylinidae.

== Anatomy ==
- Broadly oval, compact, long slender legs.
- Elytra long, cover all but last few abdominal segments
- Tarsi 5-5-5.

== Ecology ==
- Habitat: found on fungi, and slime molds.
- Collection Method: check fungi and slime molds.
- Biology: entire subfamily is mycophagous, most diverse in the tropics.

== Systematics ==
Seven genera and 70 species in North America.

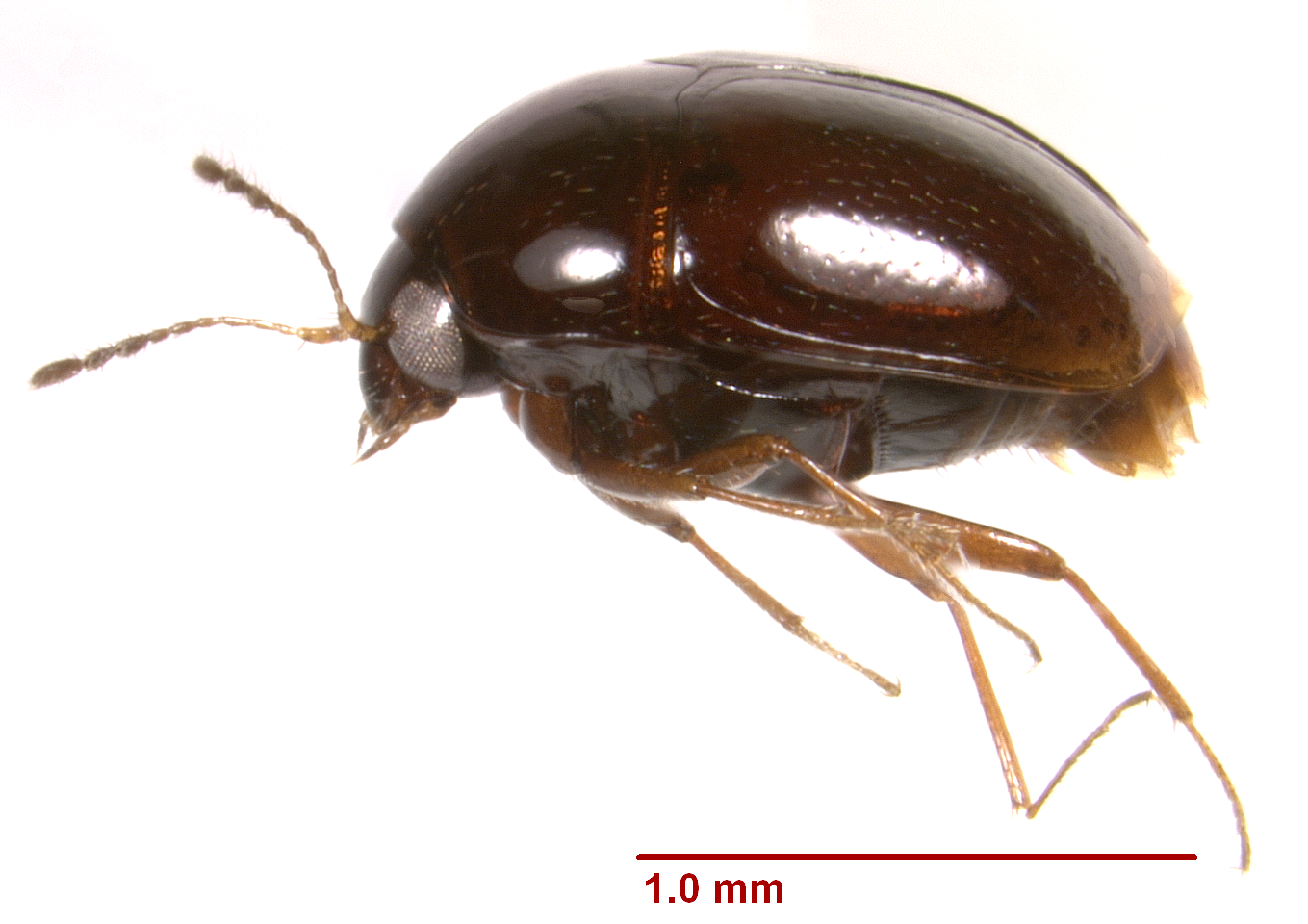
Baeocera sp.

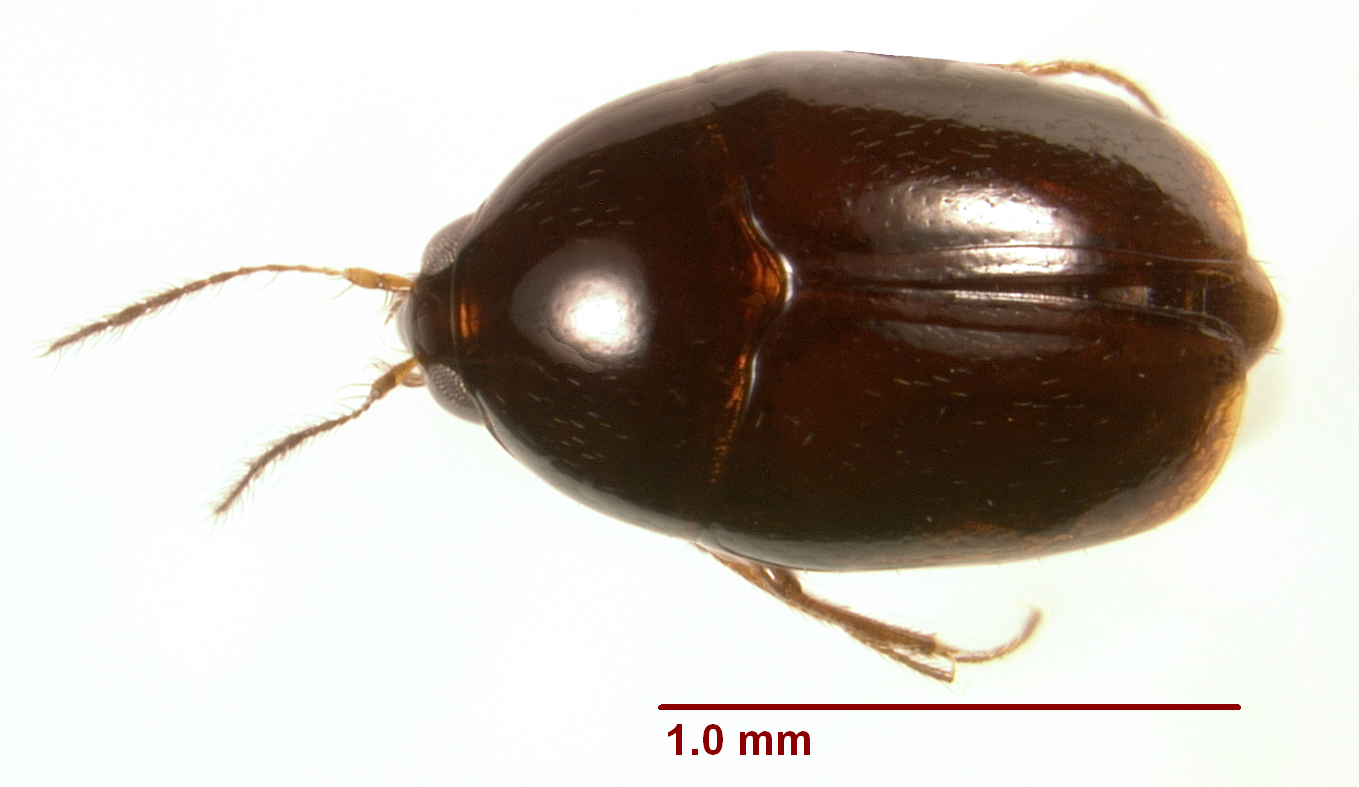
Baeocera sp.

Genera include:

- Alexidia Reitter, 1880
- Amalocera Erichson, 1845
- Baeocera Erichson, 1845
- Cyparium Erichson, 1845
- Scaphidium Olivier, 1790
- Scaphisoma Leach, 1815
- Toxidium LeConte, 1860
