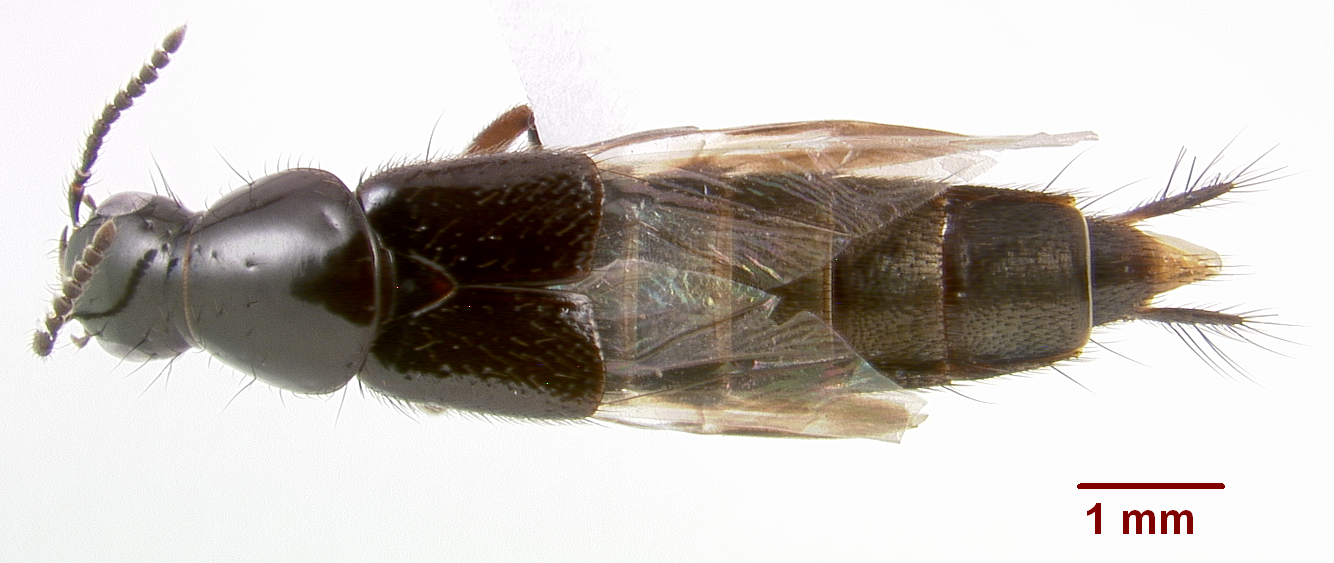
- Quedius capucinus

Scientific classification
- Kingdom: Animalia
- Phylum: Arthropoda
- Clade: Pancrustacea
- Class: Insecta
- Order: Coleoptera
- Suborder: Polyphaga
- Infraorder: Staphyliniformia
- Family: Staphylinidae
- Subfamily: Staphylininae
- Tribe: Staphylinini

= Staphylinini =

Tribe of beetles

Staphylinini is a tribe of large rove beetles in the family Staphylinidae. There are at least 17 subtribes, 230 genera, and 6260 described species in Staphylinini.

== Tribes ==
Staphylinini contains 17 subtribes, with one being extinct:

- Acylophorina Outerelo & Gamarra, 1985
- Afroquediina Brunke, Żyła & Solodovnikov, 2019
- Algonina Schillhammer & Brunke, 2018
- Anisolinina Hayashi, 1993
- Antimerina Brunke, Żyła & Solodovnikov, 2019
- Cyrtoquediina Brunke & Solodovnikov, 2016
- Descarpentriesiellina Reyes-Hernández, Brunke, Hansen, Qinghao Zhao et al., 2025
- Erichsoniina Brunke & Solodovnikov, 2016
- Indoquediina Brunke & Solodovnikov, 2016
- Philonthina Kirby, 1837
- Philothalpina Chatzimanolis & Brunke, 2018
- Quediina Kraatz, 1857
- Quelaestrygonina Brunke, 2021
- Staphylinina Latreille, 1802
- Valdiviodina Reyes-Hernández, Brunke, Hansen, Qinghao Zhao et al., 2025
- Xanthopygina Sharp, 1884
- †Baltognathina Brunke, Żyła & Solodovnikov, 2019

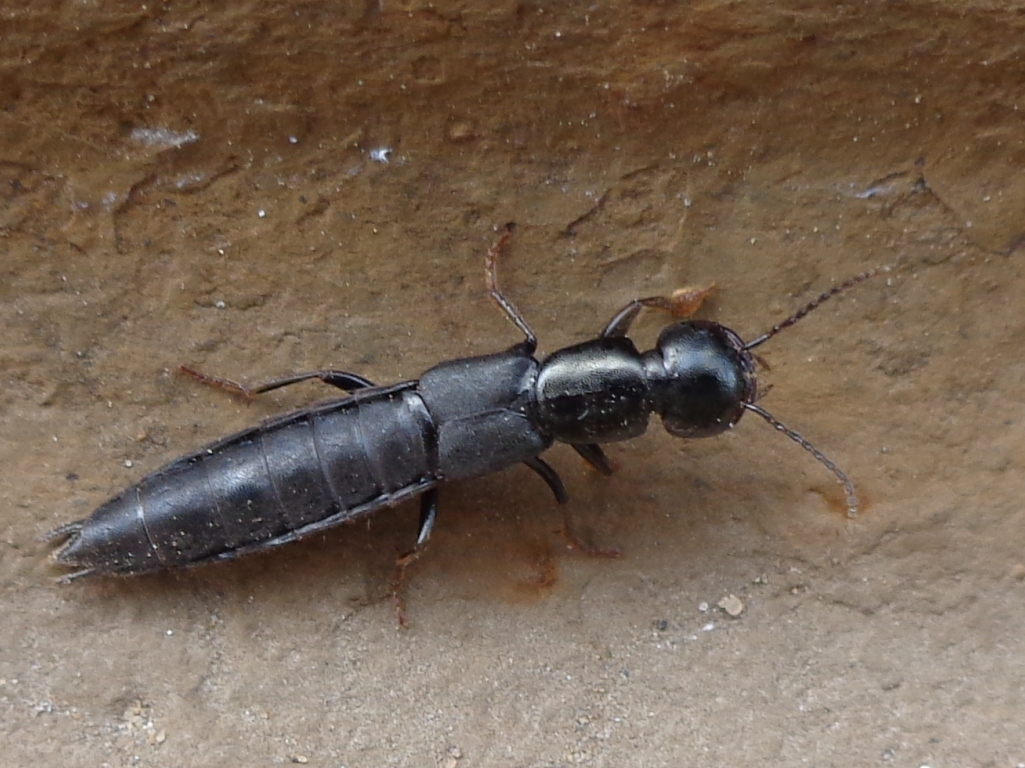
Tasgius ater

== Genera ==
- Abemus Mulsant & Rey, 1876
- Actinomorphus Schillhammer, 1996
- Actinus Fauvel, 1878
- Acupronotes Brunke & Smetana, 2020
- Acylohsellus Smetana, 1995
- Acylophorus Nordmann, 1837
- Afroquedius Solodovnikov, 2006
- Afrorabigus Levasseur, 1965
- Agacerus Fauvel, 1895
- Agelosus Sharp, 1889
- Alesiella Brunke & Solodovnikov, 2013
- Algon Sharp, 1874
- Amacylophorus Smetana, 1971
- Amelinus Bernhauer, 1915
- Amichrotus Sharp, 1889
- Anaquedius Casey, 1915
- Anchocerus Fauvel, 1905
- Andinolonthus Rodríguez-Melgarejo, Ramírez-Salamanca & Chani-Posse, 2025
- Anisolinus Sharp, 1889
- Anthosaurus Smetana, 2015
- Antimerus Fauvel, 1878
- Atanygnathus
- Beeria
  - Beeria nematocera Casey, 1915
- Belonuchus Bordmann, 1837
- Bisnius
- Cafius Stephens, 1829
- Creophilus
- Dinothenarus
- Erichsonius
- Euryporus Erichson, 1839
- Flohria Sharp, 1884
- Gabrius
- Gabronthus
- Hadrotes Le Conte, 1861
- Hemiquedius Casey, 1915
- Hesperus
- Heterothops
- Holisus (Hyptioma) cubensis Casey, 1906
- Indoquedius Blackwelder, 1952
- Laetulonthus Moore & Legner, 1973
- Malaisdius Brunke, 2023
- Neobisnius
- Ocypus
- Ontholestes
- Philonthus Stephens, 1829
- Platydracus
- Quedius Stephens, 1829
- Tasgius
- Thinopinus Le Conte, 1852
- Tympanophorus
- Xanthopygus
