= Hesperus (disambiguation) =

Hesperus (or Hesperos) was a Greek mythological figure.

Hesperus may also refer to:

== People ==
- Hesperos or Wesparos, a name for the Western Locrians

== Places in the United States ==
- Hesperus, Colorado, an unincorporated community in Colorado
- Hesperus Mountain (Colorado), a mountain in the San Juan Mountains of Colorado
- Hesperus Ski Area, a ski area near Hesperus, Colorado
- Mount Hesperus (Alaska), a mountain in the Revelation Mountains of Alaska

== Arts, entertainment, and media ==
- Hesperus (ensemble), an early-music ensemble
- Hesperos, a periodical newspaper, issued in Leipzig, in the late 19th century, in Greek
- Hesperus Press Ltd., a British independent publisher
- Hesperus oder 45 Hundposttage, a 1795 novel by the German Romantic writer Jean Paul

== Ships ==
- Hesperus (clipper ship), traded between England and Adelaide, South Australia
- HMS Hesperus (H57), a destroyer in the Royal Navy

== Other uses ==
- Hesperus (beetle), a genus of rove beetles

== See also ==
- Esperos, a modern Greek football club
- Hesperides
- Hesperis
- Hesperium
- Hesperius
- Wreck of the Hesperus (band)
- "Wreck of the Hesperus" (song)
- "Wreck of the Hesperus", a poem by Henry Wadsworth Longfellow
