= Quediina =

- Paraquedius marginicollis

Scientific classification
- Kingdom: Animalia
- Phylum: Arthropoda
- Clade: Pancrustacea
- Class: Insecta
- Order: Coleoptera
- Suborder: Polyphaga
- Infraorder: Staphyliniformia
- Family: Staphylinidae
- Tribe: Staphylinini
- Subtribe: Quediina; Kraatz, 1857

Subtribe of beetles

Quediina is a subtribe of rove beetles in the tribe Staphylinini. It contains roughly 14 genera and 950 species.

== Genera ==
Quediina contains the following genera:

- Anthosaurus Smetana, 2015
- Euryporus Erichson, 1839
- Iratiquedius Brunke, 2022
- Korgella Özdikmen, 2005
- Malaisdius Brunke, 2023
- Paraquedius Casey, 1915
- Pseudorientis Watanabe, Y., 1970
- Quediellus Casey, 1915
- Quedionuchus Sharp, 1884
- Quedius Stephens, 1829
- Quemetopon Smetana, 2015
- Queskallion Smetana, 2015
- Quetarsius Smetana, 1996
- †Laevisaurus Brunke, Żyła & Solodovnikov, 2019
