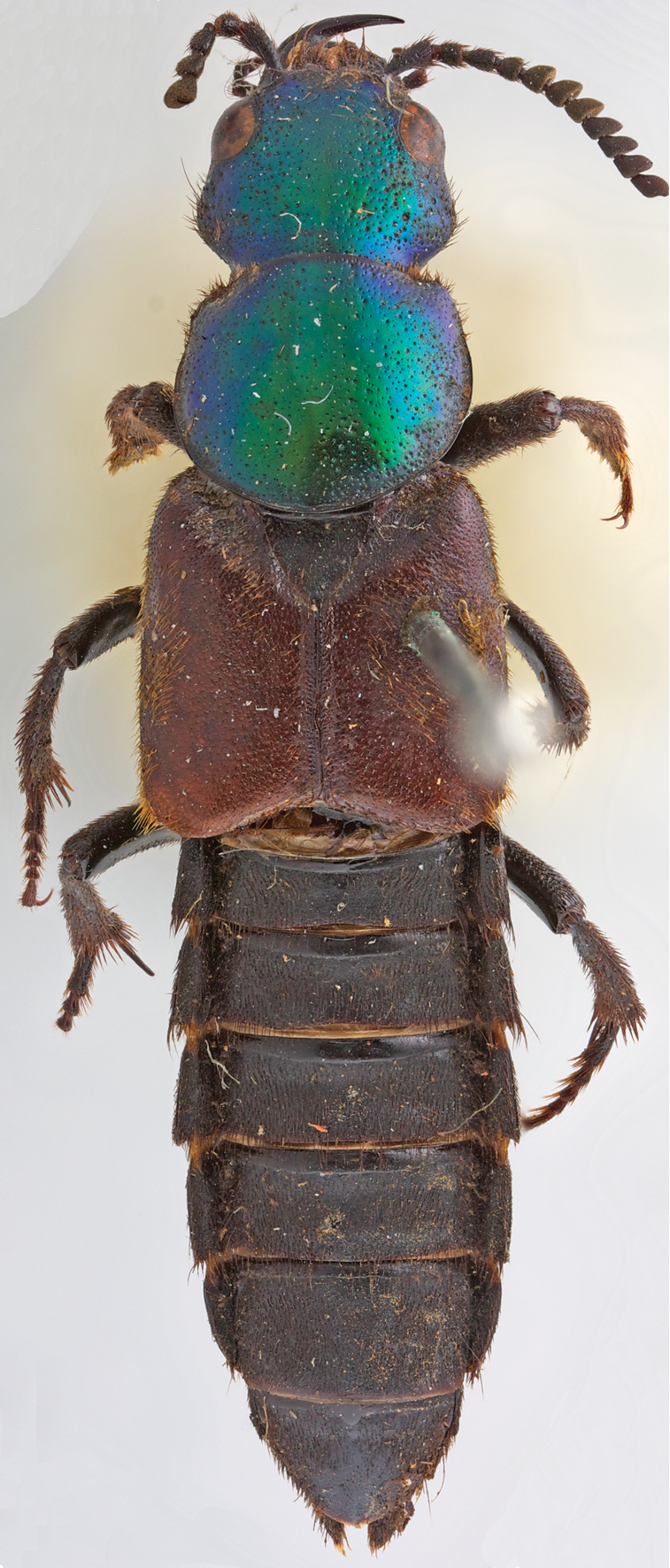

Scientific classification
- Kingdom: Animalia
- Phylum: Arthropoda
- Clade: Pancrustacea
- Class: Insecta
- Order: Coleoptera
- Suborder: Polyphaga
- Infraorder: Staphyliniformia
- Family: Staphylinidae
- Subfamily: Staphylininae
- Tribe: Staphylinini
- Subtribe: Xanthopygina
- Genus: Darwinilus; Chatzimanolis, 2014
- Species: D. sedarisi

Binomial name
- Darwinilus sedarisi Chatzimanolis, 2014

= Darwinilus =

Genus of rove beetles

Darwinilus sedarisi is a species of rove beetle, the only species in the genus Darwinilus. It is named after English naturalist, biologist, and geologist Charles Darwin and American humorist and author David Sedaris. It is found in Argentina. A specimen of the beetle was collected by Darwin in 1832 during the voyage of HMS Beagle, but not formally named as a new species until 2014.

== Taxonomy ==
Darwinilus sedarisi is classified under the family Staphylinidae, the subfamily Staphylininae, the tribe Staphilinini, and the genus Darwilinus. Darwinilus sedarisi is the only species in the genus Darwinilus.

== History ==
Darwinilus sedarisi was first described by the American evolutionary biologist and entomologist Stylianos Chatzimanolis in 2014, and was named after Charles Darwin and David Sedaris. It is known from only two specimens, both of which are males. The holotype was collected in 1832 by Darwin from Bahía Blanca, Argentina, during the voyage of HMS Beagle.

The second specimen was collected from Río Cuarto, Córdoba, by a certain Breuer and deposited at the Natural History Museum in Berlin, Germany. The exact date the specimen was collected is not known, but it is known to have happened before 1935, since the German entomologists Walther Horn and Ilse Kahle listed Breuer's collection in a 1935 paper.
