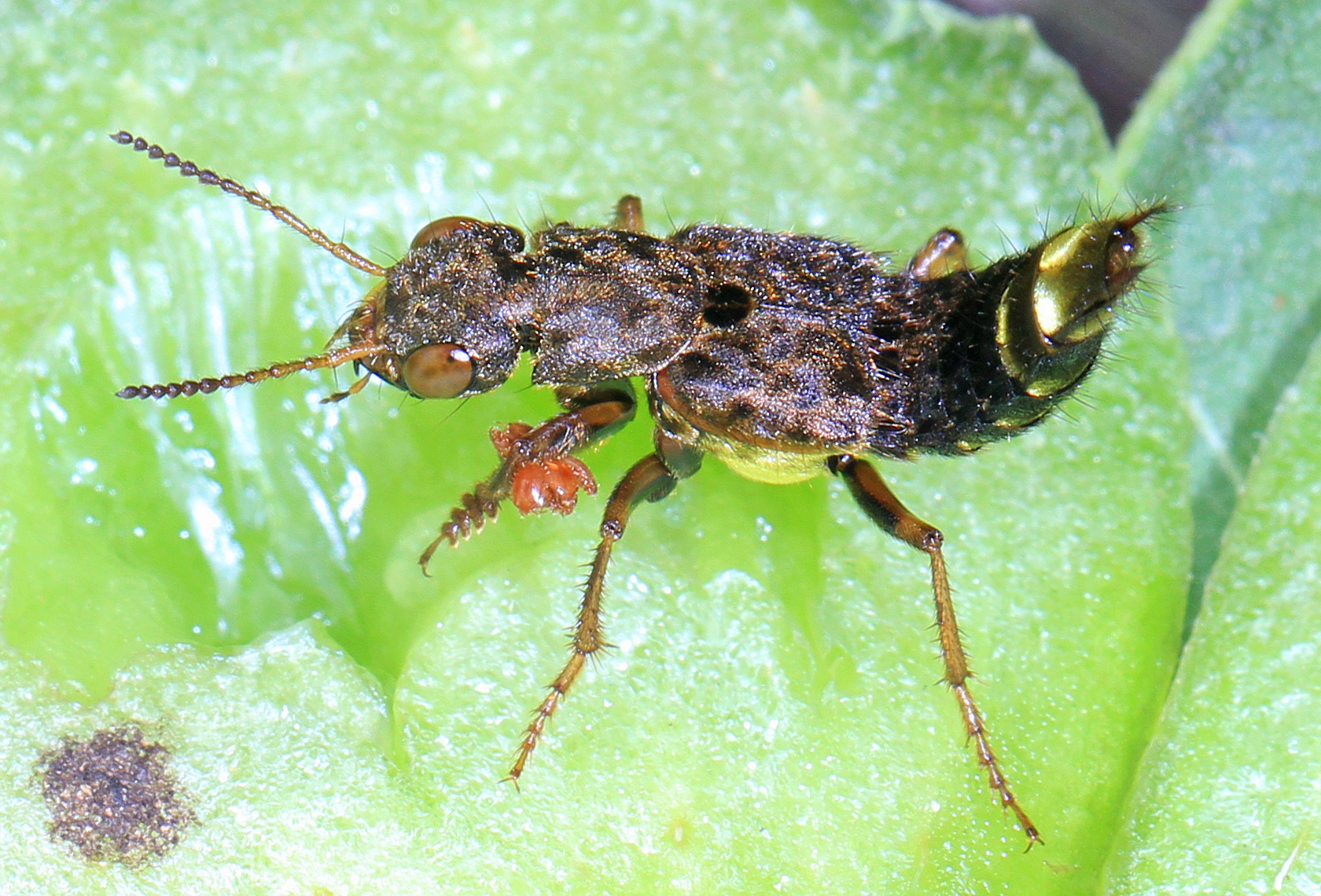
- Ontholestes cingulatus

Scientific classification
- Kingdom: Animalia
- Phylum: Arthropoda
- Clade: Pancrustacea
- Class: Insecta
- Order: Coleoptera
- Suborder: Polyphaga
- Infraorder: Staphyliniformia
- Family: Staphylinidae
- Tribe: Staphylinini
- Subtribe: Staphylinina
- Genus: Ontholestes; Ganglbauer, 1895

= Ontholestes =

Genus of beetles

Ontholestes is a genus of large rove beetles in the family Staphylinidae. There are at least 20 described species in Ontholestes.

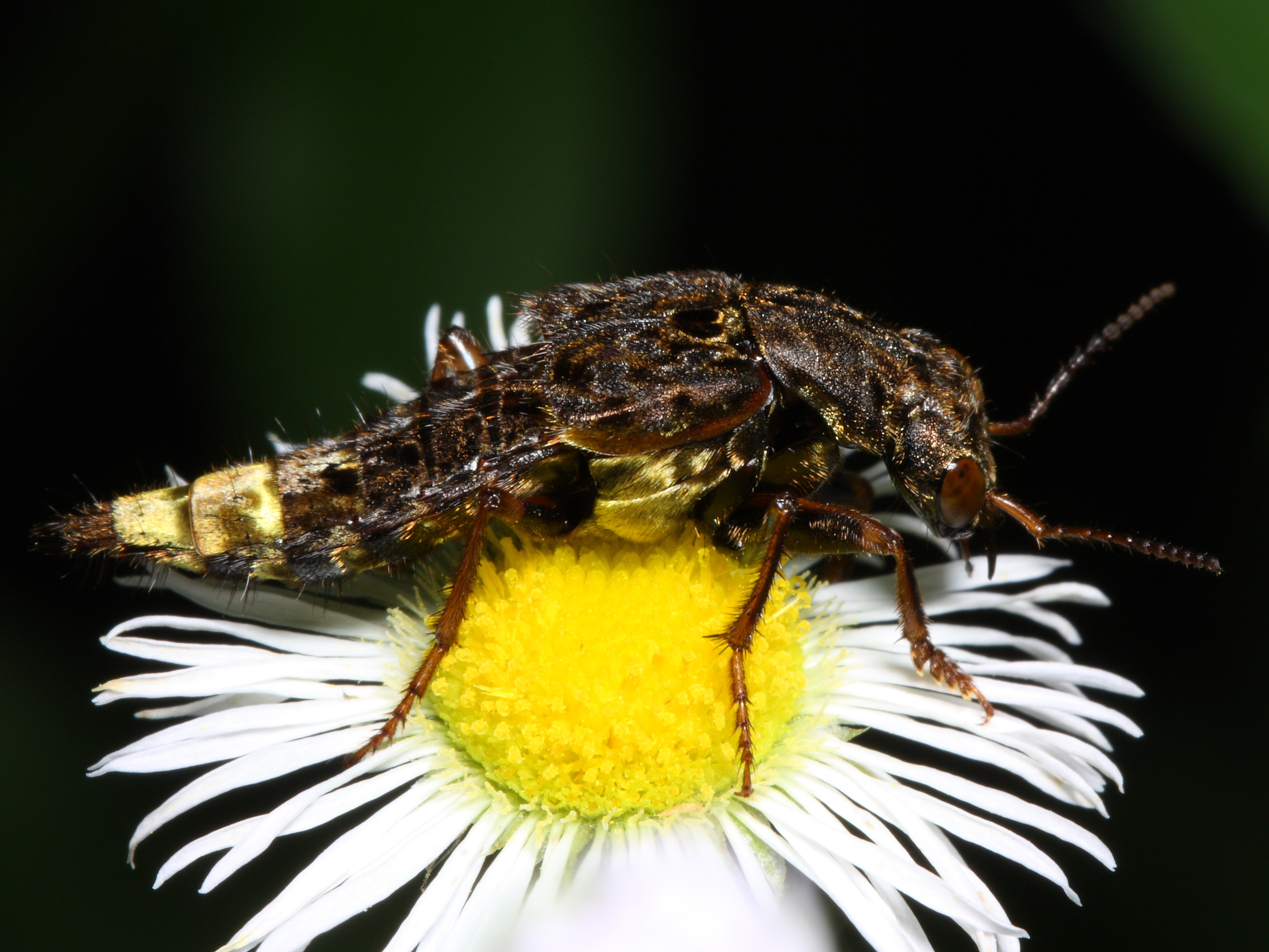
Ontholestes cingulatus

== Species ==
These 21 species belong to the genus Ontholestes:

- Ontholestes asiaticus Smetana, 1959^{c g}
- Ontholestes aurosparsus Fauvel, 1895^{c g}
- Ontholestes callistus Hochhuth, 2012^{c g}
- Ontholestes cingulatus (Gravenhorst, 1802)^{g b} (gold-and-brown rove beetle)
- Ontholestes gracilis Sharp, 1874^{c g}
- Ontholestes hairaerensis Li & Chen,/1993^{c g}
- Ontholestes haroldi (Eppelsheim, 1884)^{g}
- Ontholestes hayashii Li, 1992^{c g}
- Ontholestes inauratus Mannerheim, 1830^{c g}
- Ontholestes marginalis (Gené, 1836)^{g}
- Ontholestes murinus Linnaeus, 1758^{c g}
- Ontholestes napoensis Zhuo Yang, Hong-Zhang Zhou, 2012^{c g}
- Ontholestes oculatus Sharp, 1874^{c g}
- Ontholestes orientalis Bernhauer, 1906^{c g}
- Ontholestes paramurinus Li & Chen, 1993^{c g}
- Ontholestes proximus Kirshenblat, 1936^{c g}
- Ontholestes rosti Bernhauer, ms^{c}
- Ontholestes simulator Kirshenblat, 1936^{c g}
- Ontholestes tenuicornis Kraatz, 1859^{c g}
- Ontholestes tessellatus Geoffroy, 1785^{c g}
- Ontholestes xinqiaoensis Zhuo Yang, Hong-Zhang Zhou, 2012^{c g}

Data sources: i = ITIS, c = Catalogue of Life, g = GBIF, b = Bugguide.net
