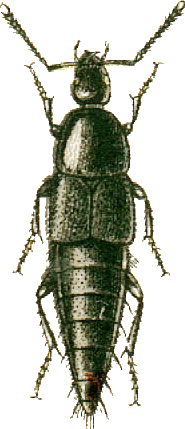
- Acylophorus glaberrimus

Scientific classification
- Kingdom: Animalia
- Phylum: Arthropoda
- Clade: Pancrustacea
- Class: Insecta
- Order: Coleoptera
- Suborder: Polyphaga
- Infraorder: Staphyliniformia
- Family: Staphylinidae
- Tribe: Staphylinini
- Subtribe: Acylophorina; Outerelo & Gamarra, 1985

= Acylophorina =

Subtribe of beetles

Acylophorina is a subtribe of rove beetles in the tribe Staphylinini. It contains roughly 11 genera and 190 species.

== Genera ==
Acylophorina contains the following genera:

- Acylohsellus Smetana, 1995
- Acylophorus Nordmann, 1837
- Amacylophorus Smetana, 1971
- Anaquedius Casey, 1915
- Anchocerus Fauvel, 1905
- Australotarsius Solodovnikov & Newton, 2009
- Hemiquedius Casey, 1915
- Paratolmerus Cameron, 1932
- Stevensia Cameron, 1932
- Turgiditarsus Schillhammer, 1997
- †Eolophorus Brunke, Żyła & Solodovnikov, 2019
