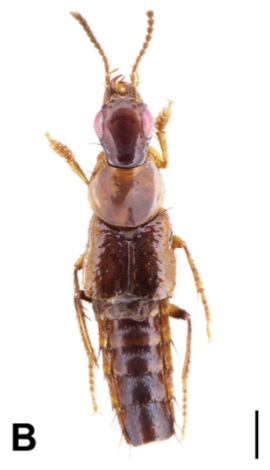

Scientific classification
- Kingdom: Animalia
- Phylum: Arthropoda
- Class: Insecta
- Order: Coleoptera
- Suborder: Polyphaga
- Infraorder: Staphyliniformia
- Family: Staphylinidae
- Genus: Malaisdius
- Species: M. smetanai

Binomial name
- Malaisdius smetanai Brunke, 2023

= Malaisdius smetanai =

Species of beetle

Malaisdius smetanai is a species of beetle of the family Staphylinidae. It is found in eastern Nepal.

== Description ==
Adults are similar to Malaisdius ruficeps, but differ by the following: the body (minus the abdomen) is 4.2 mm and adults are paler overall and not as sharply bicolored. The head, centre of the elytra, and abdominal tergites are dark orange-brown to dark brown and the pronotum, lateral parts of the elytra and paratergites are paler and brownish-orange.

== Etymology ==
This species is named in honour Dr Aleš Smetana, who was working with the author on an early morphological concept of Malaisdius (and who created the name) several years before his passing in 2021.
