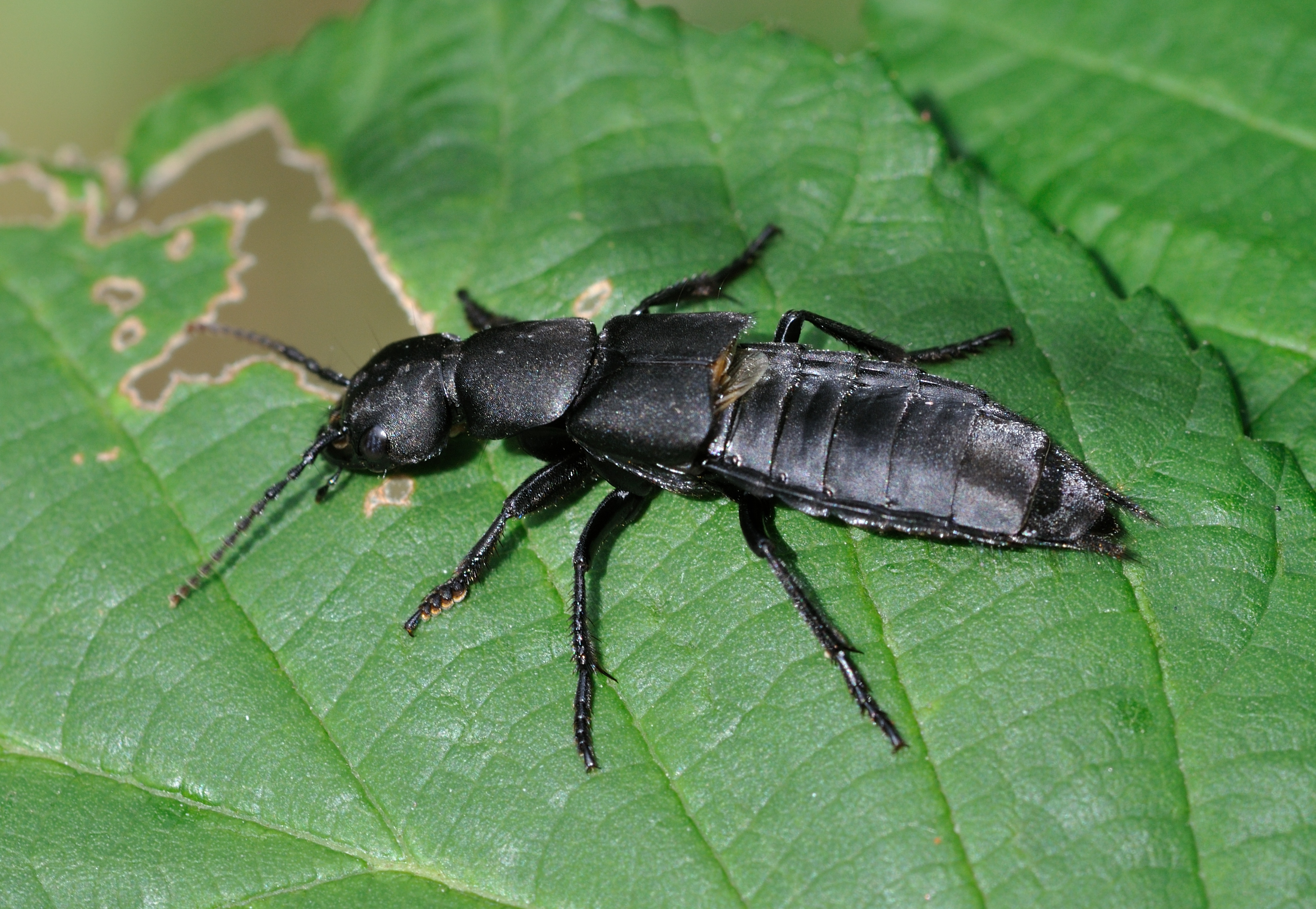
- Ocypus olens (Devil's Coach Horse Beetle)

Scientific classification
- Kingdom: Animalia
- Phylum: Arthropoda
- Clade: Pancrustacea
- Class: Insecta
- Order: Coleoptera
- Suborder: Polyphaga
- Infraorder: Staphyliniformia
- Family: Staphylinidae
- Tribe: Staphylinini
- Subtribe: Staphylinina; Latreille, 1802

= Staphylinina =

Subtribe of beetles

Staphylinina is a subtribe of rove beetles in the tribe Staphylinini. It contains roughly 50 genera and 1050 species.

== Genera ==
Staphylinina contains the following genera:

- Abemus Mulsant & Rey, 1876
- Acupronotes Brunke & Smetana, 2020
- Agelosus Sharp, 1889
- Apecholinus Bernhauer, 1933
- Apostenolinus Bernhauer, 1934
- Attadracus Zhao, Brunke, Reyes-Hernández, Hansen & Solodovnikov, 2025
- Aulacocypus Müller, 1925
- Bubastis Zhao, Brunke, Reyes-Hernández, Hansen & Solodovnikov, 2025
- Cafioquedus Sharp, 1886
- Chitocompsus Bernhauer, 1913
- Collocypus Smetana, 2003
- Creophilus Leach, 1819
- Cyanocypus He, Liang & Hong-Zhang Zhou, 2020
- Dinothenarus Thomson, 1858
- Emus Leach, 1819
- Eucibdelus Kraatz, 1859
- Guillaumius Schillhammer, 2001
- Hadropinus Sharp, 1889
- Hadrotes Mannerheim, 1852
- Leistotrophus Perty, 1830
- Lesonthotes Smetana & Brunke, 2019
- Liusus Sharp, 1889
- Luffy Hu & Solodovnikov, 2026
- Lunata Zhao, Brunke, Reyes-Hernández, Hansen & Solodovnikov, 2025
- Menoedius Fauvel, 1903
- Miobdelus Sharp, 1889
- Naddia Fauvel, 1867
- Nelmanwaslus Smetana, 2006
- Ocychinus Smetana, 2003
- Ocypus Leach, 1819
- Palaestrinus Erichson, 1839
- Parapalaestrinus Bernhauer, 1923
- Paraphytolinus Hayashi, 1999
- Philetaerius Sharp, 1889
- Physetops Mannerheim, 1830
- Phytolinus Sharp, 1889
- Platydracus Thomson, 1858
- Primor Zhao, Brunke, Reyes-Hernández, Hansen & Solodovnikov, 2025
- Protocypus Müller, 1923
- Protogoerius Coiffait, 1956
- Rhynchocheilus Sharp, 1889
- Rhyncocheilus Fauvel, 1882
- Sphaerobulbus Smetana, 2003
- Sphaeromacrops Schillhammer, 2001
- Staphylinus Linnaeus, 1758
- Tasgius Stephens, 1829
- Thinopinus LeConte, 1852
- Thoracostrongylus Bernhauer, 1915
- Trichocosmetes Kraatz, 1859
- Wasmannellus Bernhauer, 1920
