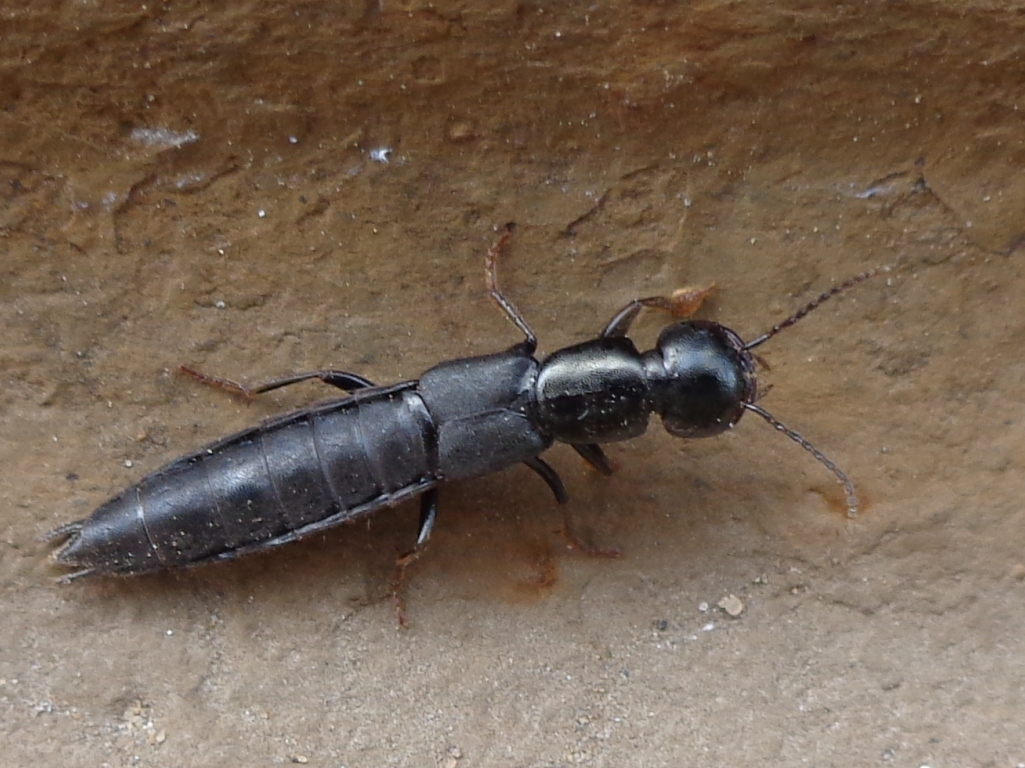
- Tasgius ater

Scientific classification
- Kingdom: Animalia
- Phylum: Arthropoda
- Class: Insecta
- Order: Coleoptera
- Suborder: Polyphaga
- Infraorder: Staphyliniformia
- Family: Staphylinidae
- Tribe: Staphylinini
- Subtribe: Staphylinina
- Genus: Tasgius; Stephens, 1829

= Tasgius =

Genus of beetles

Tasgius is a genus of large rove beetles in the family Staphylinidae. There are at least 20 described species in Tasgius.

== Species ==
These 25 species belong to the genus Tasgius:

- Tasgius arrowi (J.Muller, 1932)^{g}
- Tasgius ater (Gravenhorst, 1802)^{g b}
- Tasgius atronitidus (Reitter, 1909)^{g}
- Tasgius bellicosus (Fairmaire, 1855)^{g}
- Tasgius bulgaricus (Coiffait, 1971)^{g}
- Tasgius falcifer (Nordmann, 1837)^{g}
- Tasgius globulifer (Geoffroy, 1785)^{g}
- Tasgius herculeanus (Coiffait, 1964)^{g}
- Tasgius lusitanicus (J.Muller, 1943)^{g}
- Tasgius maderae (Jarrige, 1943)^{g}
- Tasgius melanarius (Heer, 1839)^{b}
- Tasgius messor (Nordmann, 1837)^{g}
- Tasgius minax (Mulsant & Rey, 1861)^{g}
- Tasgius morsitans (Rossi, 1790)^{g}
- Tasgius nigrinus (P.Lucas, 1846)^{g}
- Tasgius olympicus (Baudi, 1857)^{g}
- Tasgius pedator (Gravenhorst, 1802)^{g}
- Tasgius peyerimhoffi (J.Muller, 1926)^{g}
- Tasgius planipennis (Aube, 1842)^{g}
- Tasgius pliginskii (Bernhauer, 1915)^{g}
- Tasgius praetorius Bernhauer, 1915^{c g}
- Tasgius rubripennis (Reiche & Saulcy, 1856)^{g}
- Tasgius solskyi (Fauvel, 1875)^{g}
- Tasgius tricinctus (Aragona, 1830)^{g}
- Tasgius winkleri (Bernhauer, 1906)^{g b}

Data sources: i = ITIS, c = Catalogue of Life, g = GBIF, b = Bugguide.net
