= Cyrtoquediina =

- Bolitogyrus sepilok

Scientific classification
- Kingdom: Animalia
- Phylum: Arthropoda
- Clade: Pancrustacea
- Class: Insecta
- Order: Coleoptera
- Suborder: Polyphaga
- Infraorder: Staphyliniformia
- Family: Staphylinidae
- Tribe: Staphylinini
- Subtribe: Cyrtoquediina; Brunke & Solodovnikov, 2016

Subtribe of beetles

Cyrtoquediina is a subtribe of rove beetles in the tribe Staphylinini. It contains roughly 9 genera and 121 species.

== Genera ==
Cyrtoquediina contains the following genera:

- Alesiella Brunke & Solodovnikov, 2013
- Astrapaeus Gravenhorst, 1802
- Bolitogyrus Chevrolat, 1842
- Cyrtoquedius Bernhauer, 1917
- Parisanopus Brèthes, 1900
- Quediomacrus Sharp, 1884
- Quwatanabius Smetana, 2002
- Sedolinus Solodovnikov, 2006
- Sundaquedius Brunke, 2021
