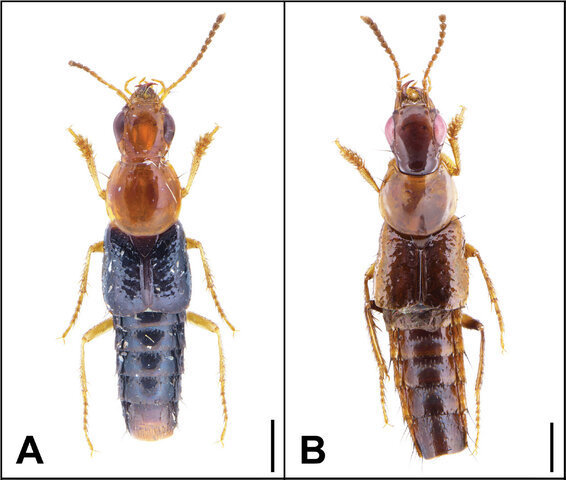

Scientific classification
- Kingdom: Animalia
- Phylum: Arthropoda
- Class: Insecta
- Order: Coleoptera
- Suborder: Polyphaga
- Infraorder: Staphyliniformia
- Family: Staphylinidae
- Tribe: Staphylinini
- Subtribe: Quediina
- Genus: Malaisdius; Brunke, 2023

= Malaisdius =

Genus of beetles

Malaisdius is a genus of rove beetles in the family Staphylinidae.

== Species ==
- Malaisdius ruficeps (Scheerpeltz, 1965)
- Malaisdius smetanai Brunke, 2023
