= Xanthopygina =

- Nordus maculiceps

Scientific classification
- Kingdom: Animalia
- Phylum: Arthropoda
- Clade: Pancrustacea
- Class: Insecta
- Order: Coleoptera
- Suborder: Polyphaga
- Infraorder: Staphyliniformia
- Family: Staphylinidae
- Tribe: Staphylinini
- Subtribe: Xanthopygina; Sharp, 1884

Subtribe of beetles

Xanthopygina is a subtribe of rove beetles in the tribe Staphylinini. It contains roughly 30 genera and 340 species.

== Genera ==
Xanthopygina contains the following genera:

- Asimos Chatzimanolis, 2023
- Darwinilus Chatzimanolis, 2014
- Drepanagrios Brunke & Chatzimanolis, 2024
- Dysanellus Bernhauer, 1911
- Elmas Blackwelder, 1952
- Gastrisus Sharp, 1876
- Glenus Kraatz, 1857
- Haematodes Laporte de Castelnau, 1835
- Ikaros Chatzimanolis & Brunke, 2021
- Isanopus Sharp, 1876
- Lendatus Chatzimanolis, 2019
- Leptodiastemus Bernhauer, 1934
- Nausicotus Sharp, 1884
- Nordus Blackwelder, 1952
- Ocyolinus Sharp, 1884
- Oligotergus Bierig, 1937
- Paraxenopygus Bernhauer, 1911
- Peripus Chatzimanolis & Hightower, 2019
- Phanolinopsis Scheerpeltz, 1968
- Phanolinus Sharp, 1884
- Photinopygus Chatzimanolis, 2021
- Plociopterus Kraatz, 1857
- Scaponopselaphus Scheerpeltz, 1972
- Scariphaeus Erichson, 1839
- Smilax Laporte de Castelnau, 1835
- Styngetus Sharp, 1884
- Terataki Chatzimanolis, 2013
- Triacrus Nordmann, 1837
- Tricholinus Bernhauer, 1922
- Trigonopselaphus Gemminger & Harold, 1868
- Xanthopygus Kraatz, 1857
- Xenopygus Bernhauer, 1906
- Zackfalinus Chatzimanolis, 2012
