= Bisnius scoticus =

Scientific classification
- Kingdom: Animalia
- Phylum: Arthropoda
- Class: Insecta
- Order: Coleoptera
- Suborder: Polyphaga
- Infraorder: Staphyliniformia
- Family: Staphylinidae
- Genus: Bisnius
- Species: B. scoticus

Binomial name
- Bisnius scoticus (Joy & Tomlin, 1913)

Species of beetle

Bisnius scoticus is a species of beetle belonging to the family Staphylinidae.

It is native to Northern Europe.
