= Norman's Woe =

Massachusetts Rock Reef

Coordinates: 42°34′35″N 70°41′58″W

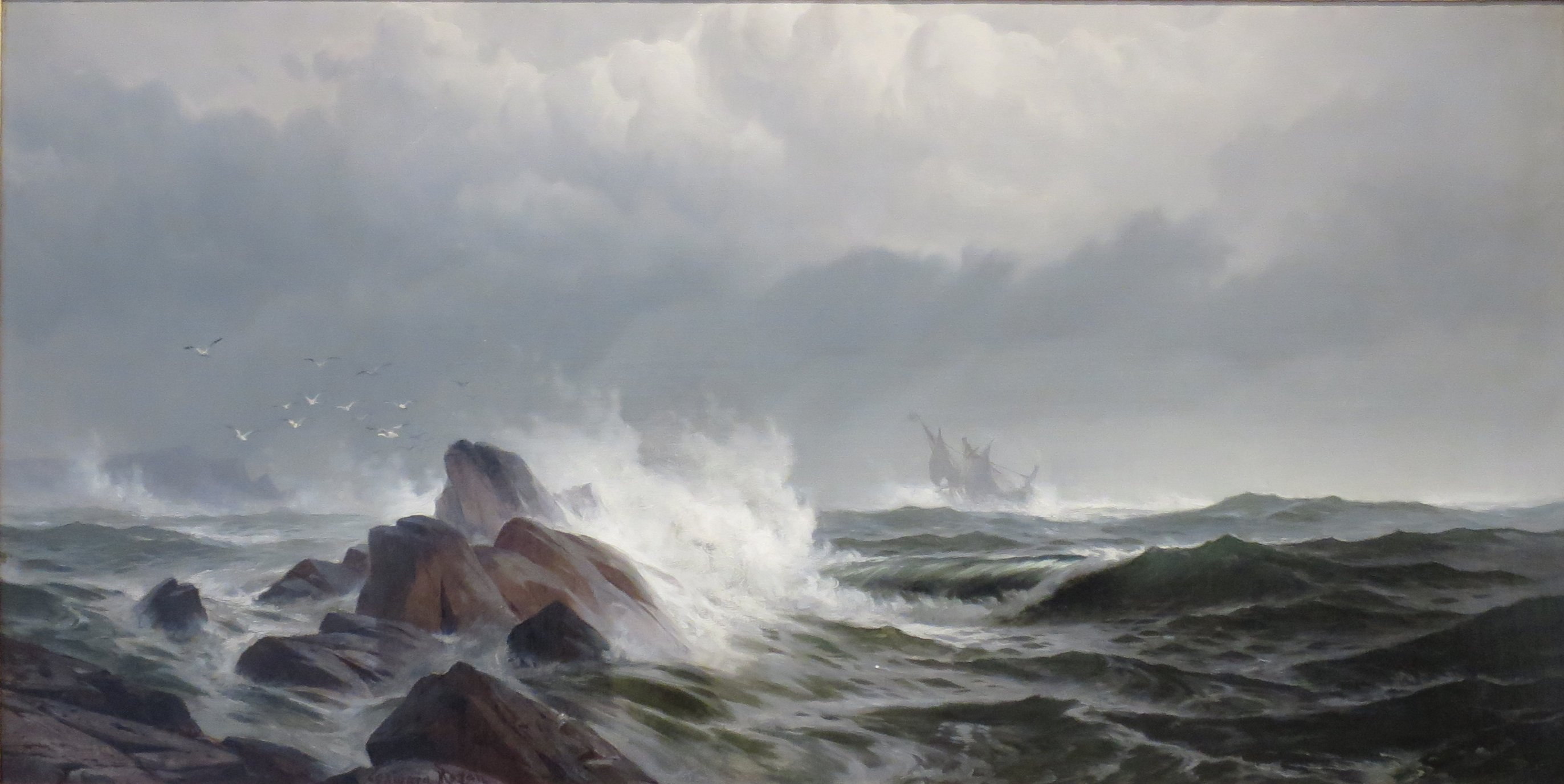
'Off Norman's Woe' by Edward Moran, High Museum of Art

Norman's Woe is a rock reef on Cape Ann in Gloucester, Massachusetts, about 500 feet offshore.

It has been the site of a number of ship wrecks including the Rebecca Ann in March, 1823 during a snowstorm. Another was the wreck of the schooner Favorite out of Wiscasset, Maine, in December 1839.

It is the subject of an 1872 painting Off Norman's Woe, by Edward Moran.

In fiction, it is the site of "The Wreck of the Hesperus", a narrative poem by Henry Wadsworth Longfellow.

Its maximum elevation is 23 feet (7.0 meters), but at high tide much of the reef is awash and so is concealed. This may have contributed to the number of wrecks at the site. A bell buoy is placed about 1000 feet ESE of the rock.
