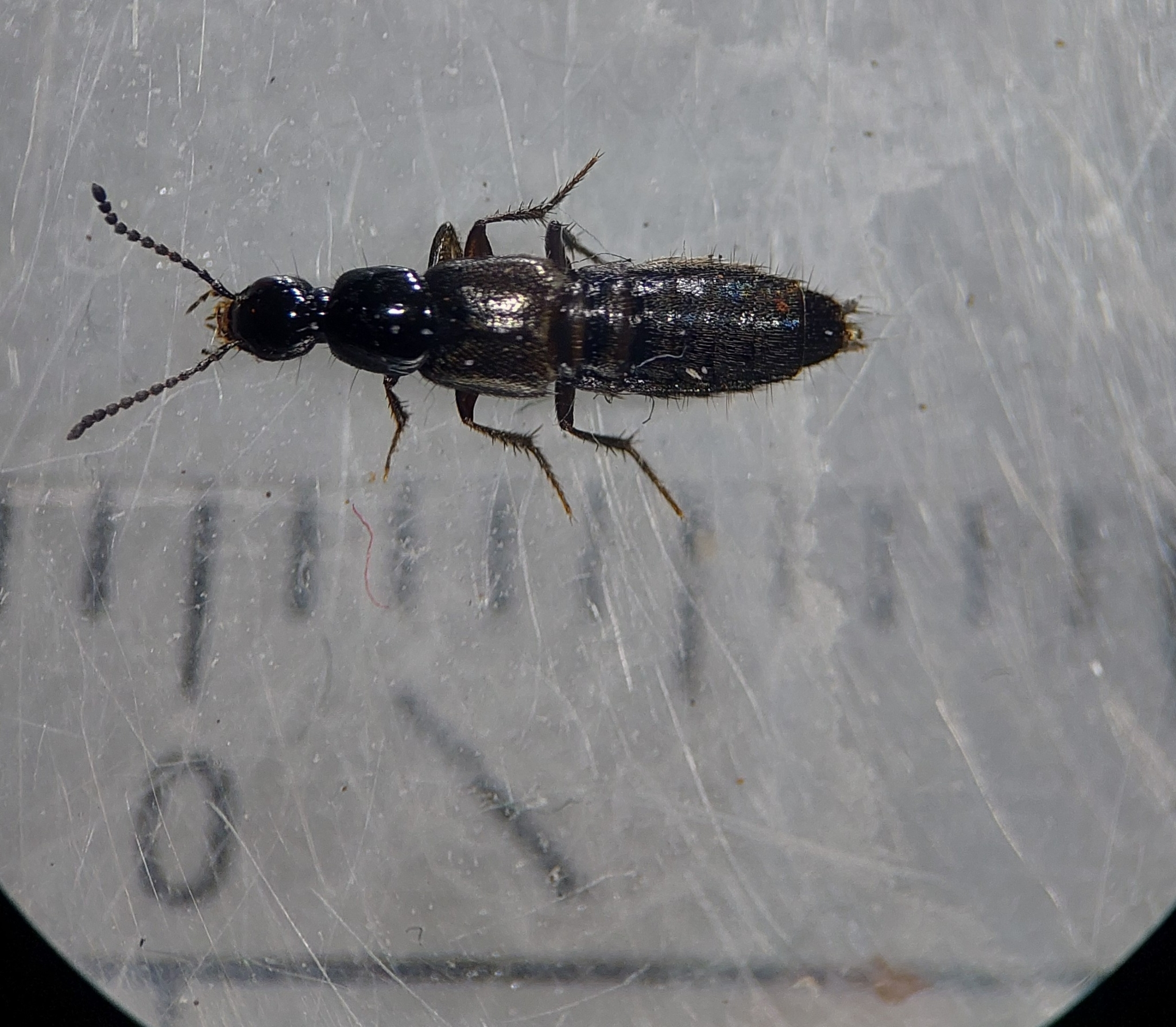
- Bisnius fimetarius

Scientific classification
- Domain: Eukaryota
- Kingdom: Animalia
- Phylum: Arthropoda
- Class: Insecta
- Order: Coleoptera
- Suborder: Polyphaga
- Infraorder: Staphyliniformia
- Family: Staphylinidae
- Subfamily: Staphylininae
- Tribe: Staphylinini
- Genus: Bisnius; Stephens, 1829

= Bisnius =

Genus of beetles

Bisnius is a genus of beetles belonging to the family Staphylinidae.

The genus was first described by Stephens in 1829.

The genus has cosmopolitan distribution.

Selected species:

- Bisnius cephalotes
- Bisnius fimetarius
- Bisnius nigriventris
- Bisnius nitidulus
- Bisnius puella
- Bisnius scoticus
- Bisnius sordidus
- Bisnius spermophili
- Bisnius subuliformis
