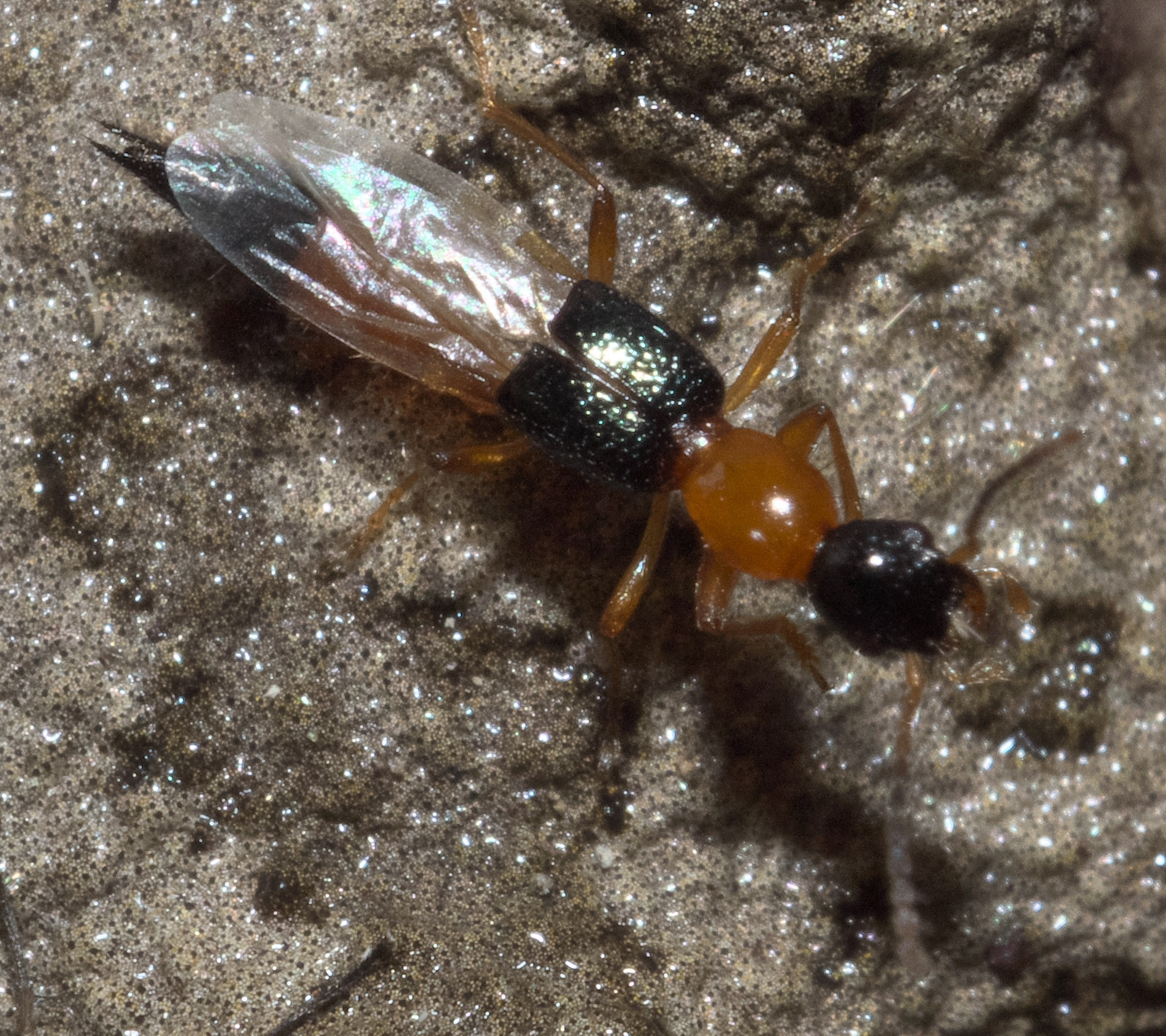

Scientific classification
- Kingdom: Animalia
- Phylum: Arthropoda
- Clade: Pancrustacea
- Class: Insecta
- Order: Coleoptera
- Suborder: Polyphaga
- Infraorder: Staphyliniformia
- Family: Staphylinidae
- Tribe: Staphylinini
- Subtribe: Philonthina
- Genus: Neobisnius; Ganglbauer, 1895

= Neobisnius =

Genus of beetles

Neobisnius is a genus of large rove beetles in the family Staphylinidae. There are at least 20 described species in Neobisnius.

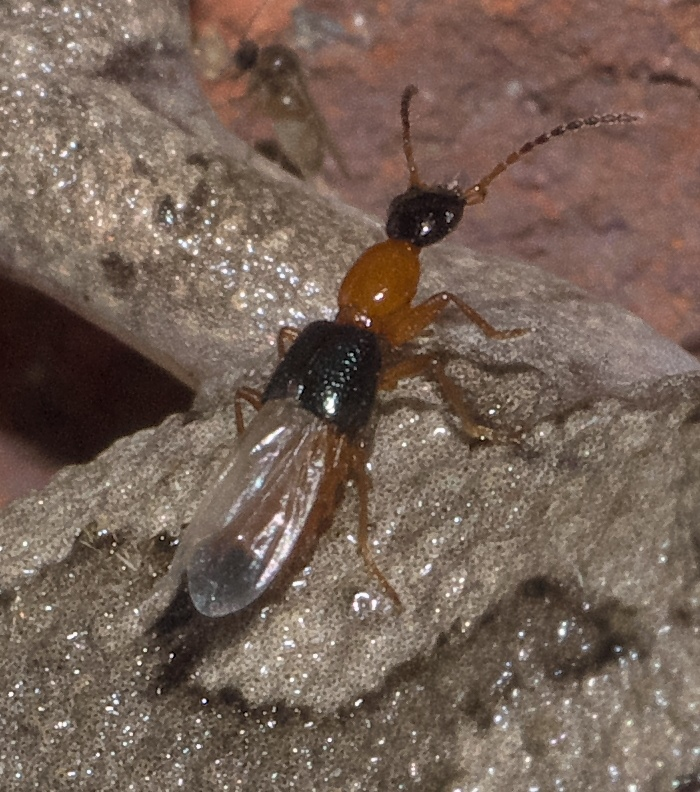
Neobisnius

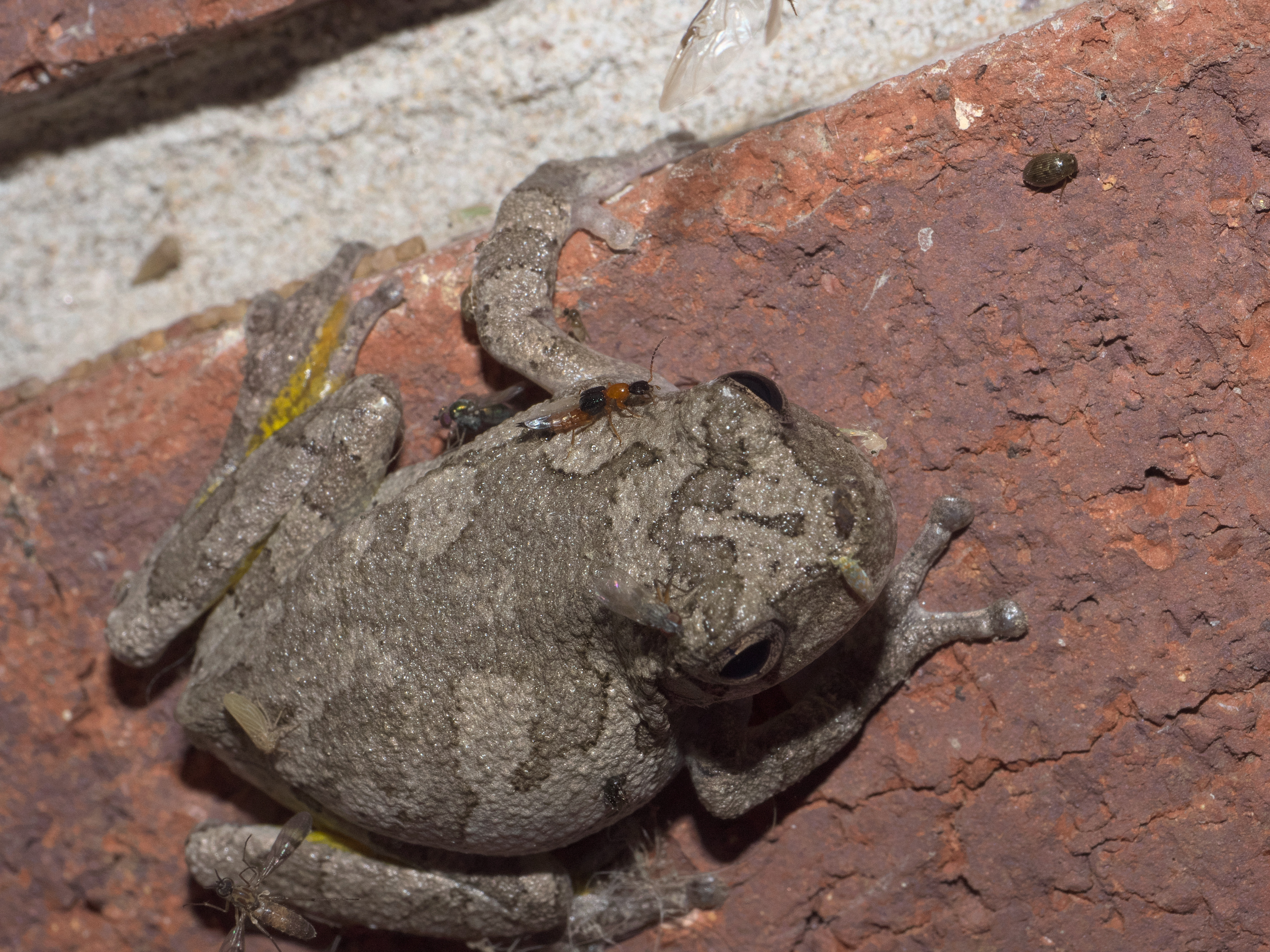
Neobisnius on a frog

== Species ==
These 22 species belong to the genus Neobisnius:

- Neobisnius chengkouensis Zheng, 1994^{c g}
- Neobisnius formosae Cameron, 1949^{c g}
- Neobisnius gratus^{b}
- Neobisnius inornatus Sharp, 1889^{c g}
- Neobisnius jocosus^{b}
- Neobisnius jucundus (Horn, 1884)^{g}
- Neobisnius lathrobioides (Baudi, 1848)^{g}
- Neobisnius nigripes Bernhauer, 1941^{c g}
- Neobisnius occidentoides Frank, 1981^{g b}
- Neobisnius oculatus Fauvel, 1905^{g}
- Neobisnius orbus (Kiesenwetter, 1850)^{g}
- Neobisnius paederoides^{b}
- Neobisnius praelongus Gemminger & Harold, 1868^{c g}
- Neobisnius procerulus Gravenhorst, 1806^{c g}
- Neobisnius prolixus Erichson, 1840^{c g}
- Neobisnius protenus Schubert, 1906^{c g}
- Neobisnius pumilis Sharp, 1874^{c g}
- Neobisnius pumilus (Sharp)^{g}
- Neobisnius senilis (Horn, 1884)^{g}
- Neobisnius sobrinus (Erichson, 1840)^{g b}
- Neobisnius terminalis (LeConte, 1863)^{g b}
- Neobisnius villosulus (Stephens, 1833)^{g}

Data sources: i = ITIS, c = Catalogue of Life, g = GBIF, b = Bugguide.net
