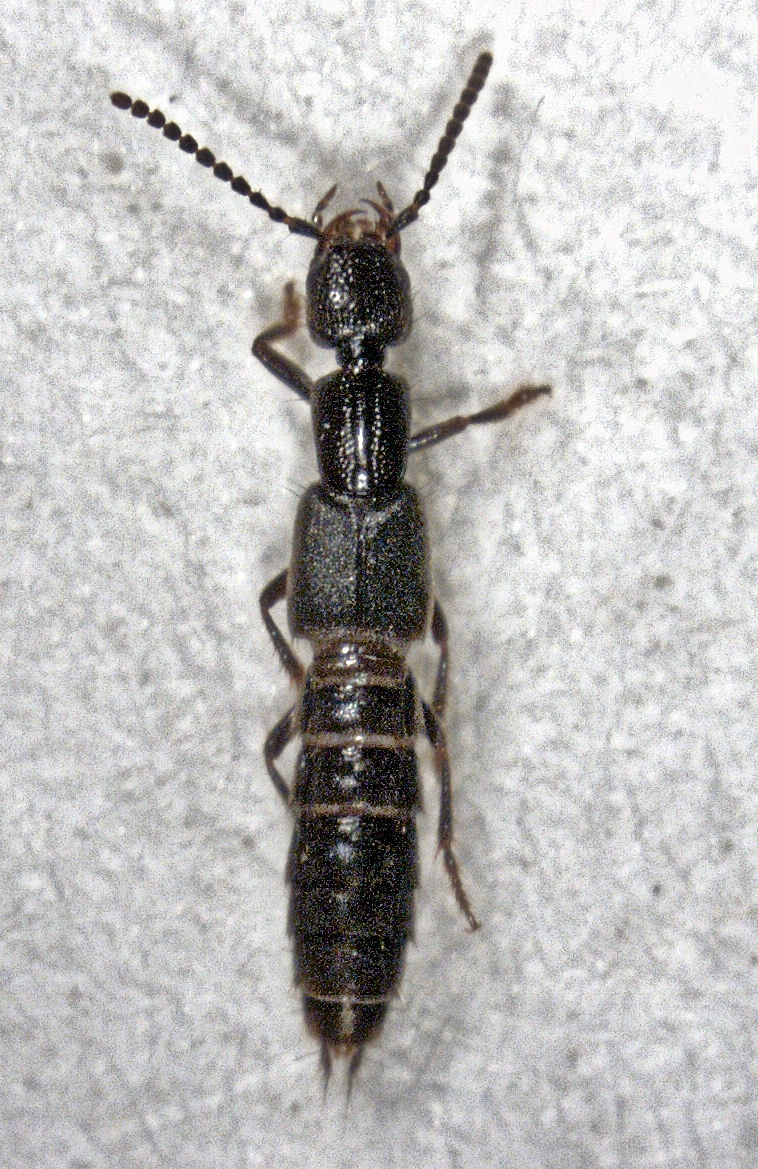
- Cafius algophilus

Scientific classification
- Kingdom: Animalia
- Phylum: Arthropoda
- Class: Insecta
- Order: Coleoptera
- Suborder: Polyphaga
- Infraorder: Staphyliniformia
- Family: Staphylinidae
- Tribe: Staphylinini
- Subtribe: Philonthina
- Genus: Cafius; Curtis, 1826

= Cafius =

Genus of beetles

Cafius is a genus of relatively large rove beetles in the family Staphylinidae. There are about 8 described species in Cafius found in North America, and approaching 50 globally.

== Species ==
- Cafius aguayoi Bierig, 1934
- Cafius bistriatus Er.
- Cafius canescens (Mäklin, 1852)
- Cafius femoralis
- Cafius lithocharinus (LeConte, 1863)
- Cafius luteipennis Le Conte
- Cafius nauticus (Fairmaire, 1849)
- Cafius seminitens Horn
- Cafius sulcicollis (LeConte, 1863)
