= Anisolinina =

Scientific classification
- Kingdom: Animalia
- Phylum: Arthropoda
- Clade: Pancrustacea
- Class: Insecta
- Order: Coleoptera
- Suborder: Polyphaga
- Infraorder: Staphyliniformia
- Family: Staphylinidae
- Tribe: Staphylinini
- Subtribe: Anisolinina; Hayashi, 1993

Subtribe of beetles

Anisolinina is a subtribe of rove beetles in the tribe Staphylinini. It contains 15 genera and 230 species.

== Genera ==
Anisolinina contains the following genera:

- Amelinus Bernhauer, 1915
- Amichrotus Sharp, 1889
- Anisolinus Sharp, 1889
- Barygnathus Bernhauer, 1902
- Bombylodes Fauvel, 1904
- Diatrechus Bernhauer, 1911
- Hesperoschema Scheerpeltz, 1965
- Hesperosoma Scheerpeltz, 1965
- Janalia Janák, 2018
- Misantlius Sharp, 1885
- Pammegus Fauvel, 1895
- Philomyceta Cameron, 1944
- Tolmerinus Bernhauer, 1923
- Trigonopalpus Cameron, 1951
- Tympanophorus Nordmann, 1837
