= Antimerus =

- Some of the species of Antimerus

Scientific classification
- Domain: Eukaryota
- Kingdom: Animalia
- Phylum: Arthropoda
- Class: Insecta
- Order: Coleoptera
- Suborder: Polyphaga
- Infraorder: Staphyliniformia
- Family: Staphylinidae
- Tribe: Staphylinini
- Genus: Antimerus; Fauvel, 1878

Species
- See text

Genus of beetles

Antimerus is a genus of rove beetles found in eastern Australia.

== Description ==
Antimerus are relatively large for rove beetles, with adults reaching 13-20 mm in length. They are robust and more or less parallel-sided, with the head approximately the same width as the rest of the body. The mandibles are relatively long, falcate and usually lack distinct internal teeth. The deflexed hypomera of the pronotum are usually visible in lateral view (concealed in A. monteithi). The first four tarsomeres on all legs are broad and bear tenent setae ventrally, and all tarsi bear one pair of empodial setae. Some species have a metallic appearance.

Putative larvae of three species (A. metallicus, A. punctipennis and A. smaragdinus) are known. They are 8-16 mm long with head widths of 1.5-3.0 mm. The head is large, subquadrate and well-sclerotised. The thorax is much narrower than the head. The abdomen is fusiform and, in well-fed larvae, may be wider in the middle than the head is. The surfaces of the body are generally microspinose or microtuberculate, and covered in fine simple setae. Most macrosetae and many medium-sized setae are club-shaped and have multispinose tips.

== Ecology ==
Antimerus occur in moist forests in the coastal hills and mountain ranges of eastern Australia. At least some species in this genus have diurnal and arboreal adults. They have been collected from trees such as Argyrodendron actinophyllum and Eucalyptus spp. Larvae have been collected from forest litter.

== Species ==
Below are the species groups and species of Antimerus. Members of the same species groups are similar morphologically and do not overlap in distribution (allopatric).

- Antimerus auricomus Lea, 1925 - southern Queensland, New South Wales
- Antimerus bellus Solodovnikov & Newton, 2010 - New South Wales
- Antimerus gracilis Solodovnikov & Newton, 2010 - northern Queensland
- Antimerus jamesrodmani Solodovnikov & Newton, 2010 - southern Queensland
- Antimerus metallicus Solodovnikov & Newton, 2010 - northern Queensland
- Antimerus monteithi Solodovnikov & Newton, 2010 - southern Queensland, northern New South Wales
- Antimerus posttibialis Lea, 1925 - northern Queensland
- Antimerus punctipennis Lea, 1906 - southern Queensland, New South Wales
- Antimerus smaragdinus Fauvel, 1878 - southern New South Wales, Victoria, South Australia, Tasmania
