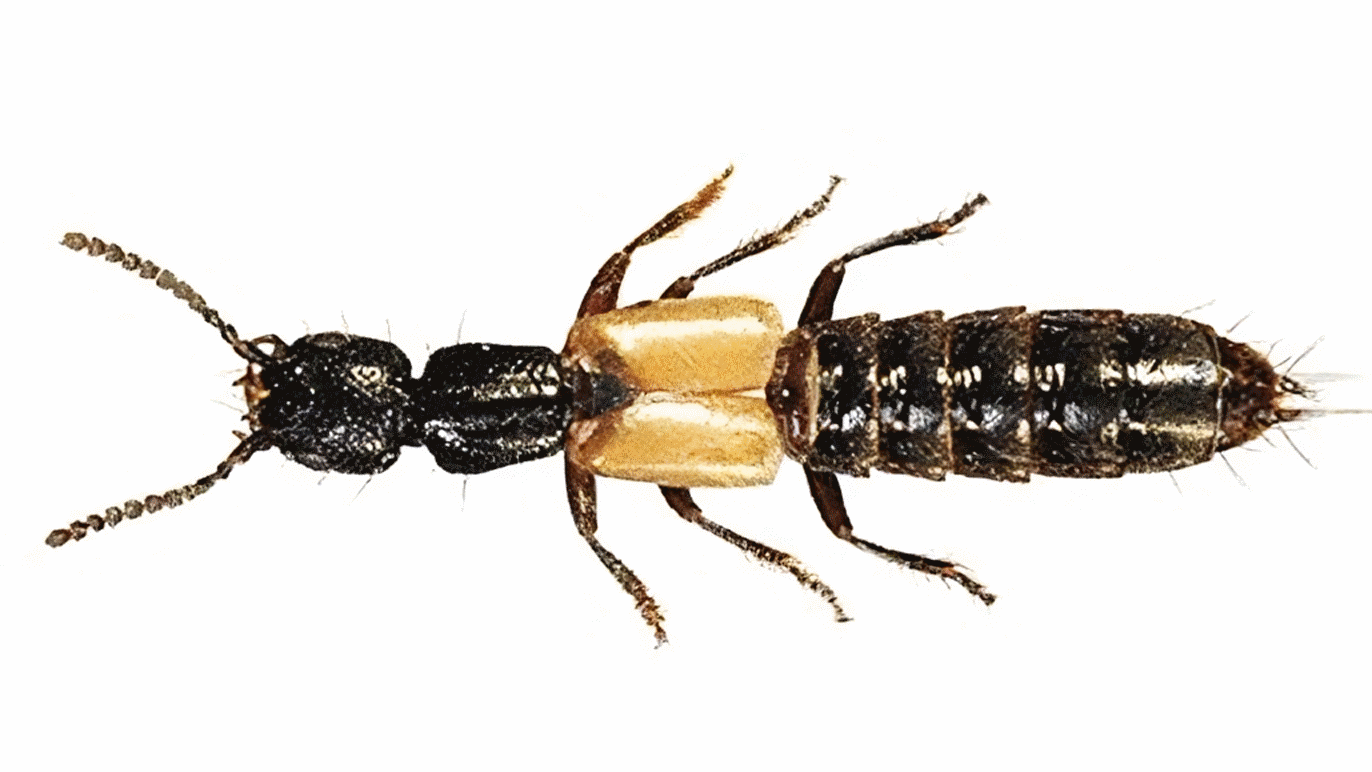

Scientific classification
- Kingdom: Animalia
- Phylum: Arthropoda
- Class: Insecta
- Order: Coleoptera
- Suborder: Polyphaga
- Infraorder: Staphyliniformia
- Family: Staphylinidae
- Genus: Cafius
- Species: C. luteipennis

Binomial name
- Cafius luteipennis Le Conte

= Cafius luteipennis =

Species of beetle

Cafius luteipennis is a species of large rove beetle in the family Staphylinidae. It can be found from British Columbia to Baja California.
