= Atanygnathus =

Scientific classification
- Kingdom: Animalia
- Phylum: Arthropoda
- Class: Insecta
- Order: Coleoptera
- Suborder: Polyphaga
- Infraorder: Staphyliniformia
- Family: Staphylinidae
- Subfamily: Staphylininae
- Tribe: Staphylinini
- Genus: Atanygnathus; Jakobson, 1909

Genus of beetles

Atanygnathus is a genus of beetles belonging to the family Staphylinidae.

The genus was first described by Jakobson in 1909.

The genus has cosmopolitan distribution.

Species:

- Atanygnathus bicolor (Casey, 1915)
- Atanygnathus terminalis (Erichson, 1839)
- Atanygnathus poussereaui Kocian & Hlaváč, 2019
