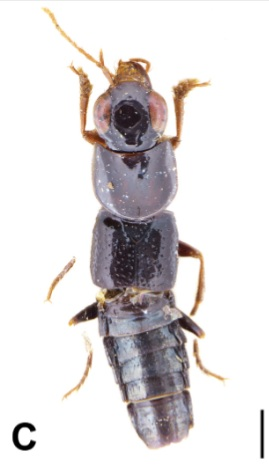
- Indoquedius dispersepunctatus

Scientific classification
- Kingdom: Animalia
- Phylum: Arthropoda
- Clade: Pancrustacea
- Class: Insecta
- Order: Coleoptera
- Suborder: Polyphaga
- Infraorder: Staphyliniformia
- Family: Staphylinidae
- Tribe: Staphylinini
- Subtribe: Indoquediina
- Genus: Indoquedius; Blackwelder, 1952

Synonyms
- Quedius (Indoquedius) Cameron, 1932

= Indoquedius =

Genus of beetles

Indoquedius is a genus of rove beetles in the family Staphylinidae.

== Selected species ==
The genus contains the following species:

- Indoquedius aberrans (Cameron, 1932)
- Indoquedius arcus Smetana, 2014
- Indoquedius bicornutus Zhao, Zong-Yi & Hong-Zhang Zhou, 2010
- Indoquedius bing Smetana, 1995
- Indoquedius bipunctatus (Eppelsheim, 1895)
- Indoquedius borneensis (Cameron, 1933)
- Indoquedius chuen Smetana, 2001
- Indoquedius daai Smetana, 1988
- Indoquedius dispersepunctatus (Scheerpeltz, 1965)
- Indoquedius filicornis (Eppelsheim, 1895)
- Indoquedius formosae (Cameron, 1949)
- Indoquedius frater Smetana, 2015
- Indoquedius grandiceps (Kraatz, 1879)
- Indoquedius hisamatsui Hayashi, Y., 2009
- Indoquedius javanus (Cameron, 1937)
- Indoquedius jendeki Smetana, 2014
- Indoquedius juno (Sharp, 1874)
- Indoquedius klapperichi Smetana, 2014
- Indoquedius lasti Rougemont, 2001
- Indoquedius leigongshanus Li, Li-Zhen, Liang Tang & Li-Long Zhu, 2007
- Indoquedius lii Li, Guofeng, Xuhai Mei, Chunmei Wang, Xingxing Wu & Fan Yang, 2022
- Indoquedius liuae Zheng, Fa-Ke & Ren-Rong Wang, 2007
- Indoquedius malaisei (Scheerpeltz, 1965)
- Indoquedius metallescens Smetana, 2014
- Indoquedius micantiventris (Scheerpeltz, 1965)
- Indoquedius oculatus (Fauvel, 1895)
- Indoquedius parallelicollis (Scheerpeltz, 1965)
- Indoquedius philippinus (Cameron, 1941)
- Indoquedius praeditus (Sharp, 1889)
- Indoquedius radius Zhao, Zong-Yi & Hong-Zhang Zhou, 2010
- Indoquedius recticollis (Scheerpeltz, 1965)
- Indoquedius saathi Smetana, 1988
- Indoquedius shibatai Smetana, 1995
- Indoquedius sikkimensis (Cameron, 1932)
- Indoquedius yunthaiensis Smetana, 2014
