= The Wreck of the Hesperus =

Poem by Henry Wadsworth Longfellow

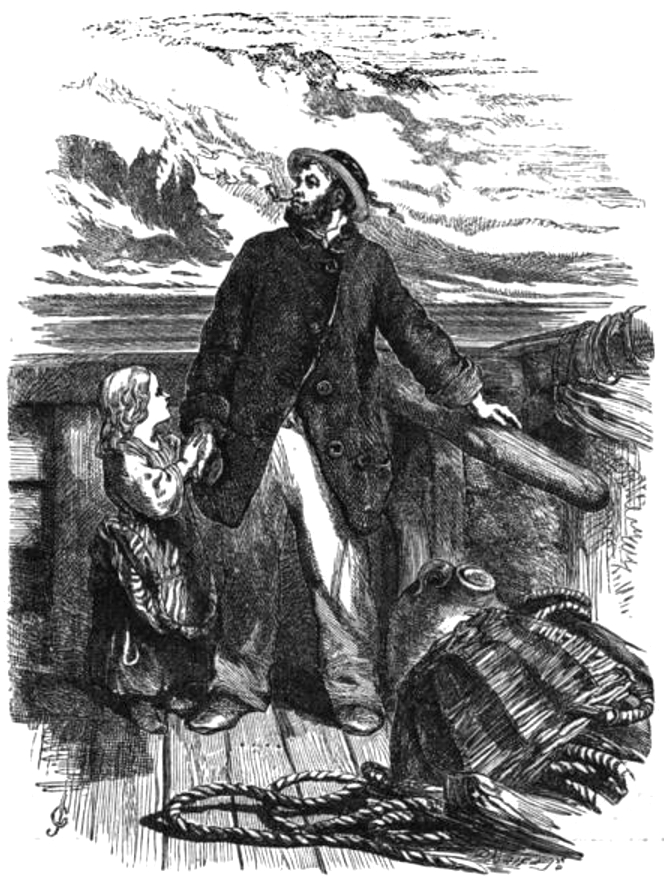
Illustration by John Gilbert

"The Wreck of the Hesperus" is a narrative poem by American poet Henry Wadsworth Longfellow, first published in Ballads and Other Poems in 1842. It is a story that presents the tragic consequences of a skipper's pride. On an ill-fated voyage in winter, he brings his daughter aboard ship for company. The skipper ignores the advice of one of his experienced men, who fears that a hurricane is approaching. When the storm arrives, the skipper ties his daughter to the mast to prevent her from being swept overboard. She calls out to her dying father as she hears the surf beating on the shore, then prays to Christ to calm the seas. The ship crashes onto the reef of Norman's Woe and sinks; the next morning a horrified fisherman finds the daughter's body, still tied to the mast and drifting in the surf. The poem ends with a prayer that all be spared such a fate "on the reef of Norman's Woe."

The poem was published in the New World, edited by Park Benjamin, which appeared on January 10, 1840. Longfellow was paid $25 for it, equivalent to $810 in 2025.

== Inspiration ==
Longfellow combined fact and fiction to create this poem. His inspiration was the great blizzard of 1839, which ravaged the north-east coast of the United States for 12 hours starting January 6, 1839, destroying 20 ships with a loss of 40 lives. The poem appears to combine two events. Longfellow probably drew for the specifics on the destruction of the Favorite, a ship from Wiscasset, Maine, on the reef of Norman's Woe off the coast of Gloucester, Massachusetts. All aboard were lost, one a woman, who reportedly floated to shore dead but still tied to the mast. The name used in the poem is that of another vessel, lost near Boston. The poem is so well known that the loop road leading close to Norman's Woe from Route 127 is named Hesperus Ave.

In December 1839, Longfellow wrote in his diary about the writing of "The Wreck of the Hesperus":

...suddenly it came into my mind to write, which I accordingly did. Then I went to bed, but could not sleep. New thoughts were running in my mind, and I got up to add them to the ballad. It was three by the clock. I then went to bed and fell asleep. I feel pleased with the ballad. It hardly cost me an effort. It did not come into my mind by lines, but by stanzas.

== Adaptations ==
"The Wreck of the Hesperus" was adapted into films of the same name in 1927 and 1948.

== Legacy ==
"Like the wreck of the Hesperus" is an archaic simile for something or someone untidy or bedraggled.

The poem has inspired titles in various media:

- In 1901, Irish composer William Harvey Pélissier wrote a cantata of this name on Longfellow's text.
- It was the inspiration for a 1944 Mighty Mouse cartoon of the same name.
- The Pleasure Island amusement park in Wakefield, Massachusetts (1958–1970), 18 miles south-west of the site where the fictional Hesperus sank, featured a ride named "The Wreck of the Hesperus".
- The rock band Procol Harum included their song "Wreck of the Hesperus" on their album A Salty Dog (1969).
- George Harrison included a song titled "Wreck of the Hesperus" on his 1987 album Cloud Nine.
- Wreck of the Hesperus is the name of an Irish doom/drone metal band.

The title appears in the lyrics of Lydia the Tattooed Lady:

On her back is the Battle of Waterloo / Beside it the wreck of the Hesperus too...

In The Ducksters (1950), Porky Pig demands of Daffy Duck, "What is the latitude and longitude of the wreck of the Hesperus?"
