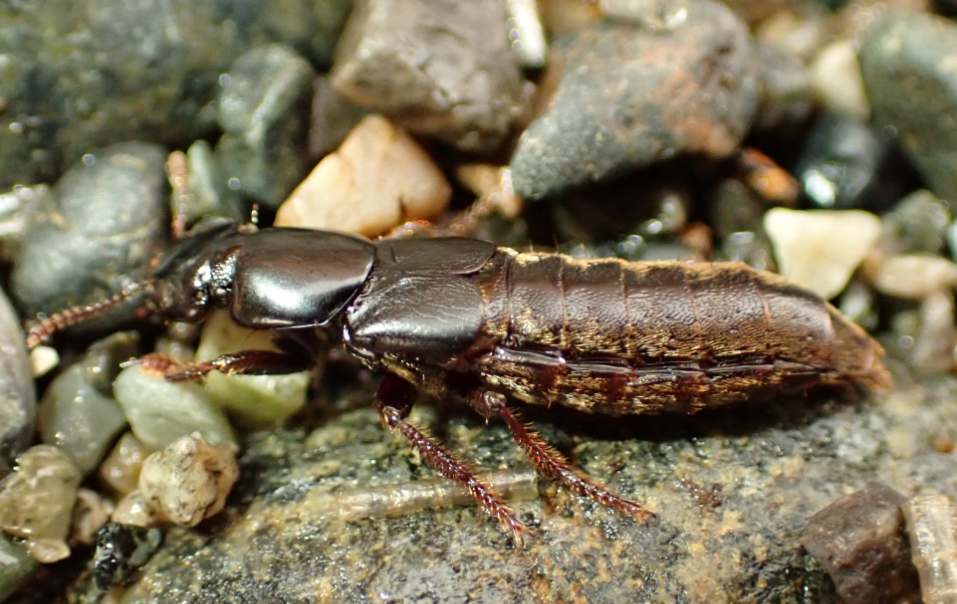
- In British Columbia

Scientific classification
- Kingdom: Animalia
- Phylum: Arthropoda
- Class: Insecta
- Order: Coleoptera
- Suborder: Polyphaga
- Infraorder: Staphyliniformia
- Family: Staphylinidae
- Genus: Hadrotes
- Species: H. crassus

Binomial name
- Hadrotes crassus Mannerheim

= Hadrotes crassus =

Species of beetle

Hadrotes crassus is a species of large rove beetle in the family Staphylinidae. It is found in North America.
