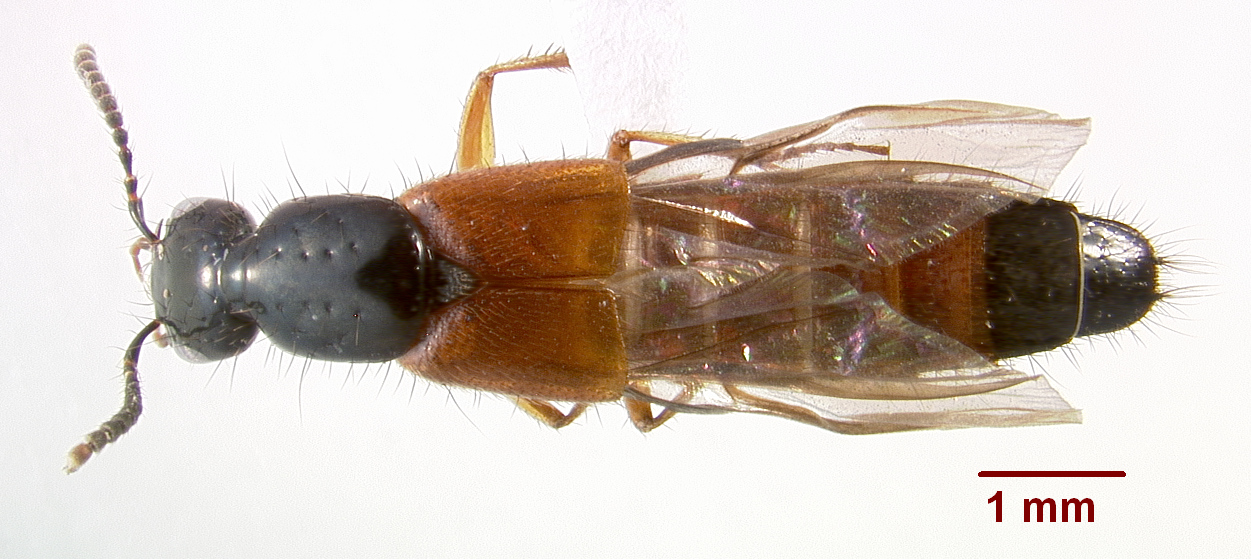

Scientific classification
- Kingdom: Animalia
- Phylum: Arthropoda
- Class: Insecta
- Order: Coleoptera
- Suborder: Polyphaga
- Infraorder: Staphyliniformia
- Family: Staphylinidae
- Genus: Belonuchus
- Species: B. rufipennis

Binomial name
- Belonuchus rufipennis (Fabricius, 1801)

= Belonuchus rufipennis =

Species of beetle

Belonuchus rufipennis is a species of large rove beetle in the family Staphylinidae. It is found in North America. It can grow to be between 4.6mm to 9mm.
