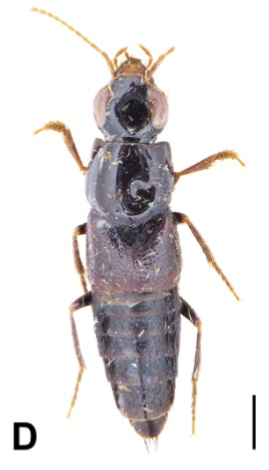

Scientific classification
- Kingdom: Animalia
- Phylum: Arthropoda
- Class: Insecta
- Order: Coleoptera
- Suborder: Polyphaga
- Infraorder: Staphyliniformia
- Family: Staphylinidae
- Genus: Indoquedius
- Species: I. parallelicollis

Binomial name
- Indoquedius parallelicollis (Scheerpeltz, 1965)

Synonyms
- Quedius (Indoquedius) parallelicollis Scheerpeltz, 1965; Quedius (Indoquedius) sanguinipennis Scheerpeltz, 1965; Indoquedius bicoloris Smetana, 2014; Indoquedius qiuae Yan et al., 2017

= Indoquedius parallelicollis =

Species of beetle

Indoquedius parallelicollis is a species of beetle of the family Staphylinidae. It is a widespread, potentially common species which is known from medium elevations in northern Myanmar and Yunnan and Sichuan in China.

Indoquedius parallelicollis appears to be tolerant to human disturbance and has been collected in a haystack and plant debris in a ruderal habitat. Other specimens have been collected in a mixed forest by sifting litter, twigs and roots.
