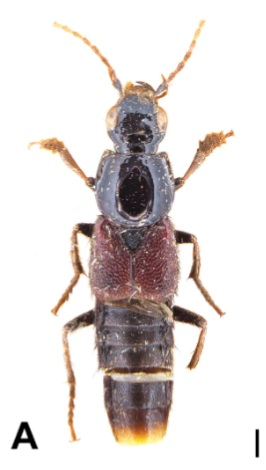

Scientific classification
- Kingdom: Animalia
- Phylum: Arthropoda
- Class: Insecta
- Order: Coleoptera
- Suborder: Polyphaga
- Infraorder: Staphyliniformia
- Family: Staphylinidae
- Genus: Indoquedius
- Species: I. malaisei

Binomial name
- Indoquedius malaisei (Scheerpeltz, 1965)

Synonyms
- Quedius (Indoquedius) malaisei Scheerpeltz, 1965; Indoquedius nonparallelus Zhao & Zhou, 2010

= Indoquedius malaisei =

Species of beetle

Indoquedius malaisei is a species of beetle of the family Staphylinidae. It is found in the Myanmar (Kachin) and China (Yunnan).
