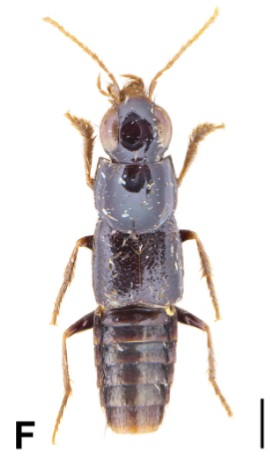

Scientific classification
- Kingdom: Animalia
- Phylum: Arthropoda
- Class: Insecta
- Order: Coleoptera
- Suborder: Polyphaga
- Infraorder: Staphyliniformia
- Family: Staphylinidae
- Genus: Indoquedius
- Species: I. recticollis

Binomial name
- Indoquedius recticollis (Scheerpeltz, 1965)

Synonyms
- Quedius (Indoquedius) recticollis Scheerpeltz, 1965

= Indoquedius recticollis =

Species of beetle

Indoquedius recticollis is a species of beetle of the family Staphylinidae. It is found in Myanmar (Kachin).
