= Cafius seminitens =

Scientific classification
- Kingdom: Animalia
- Phylum: Arthropoda
- Clade: Pancrustacea
- Class: Insecta
- Order: Coleoptera
- Suborder: Polyphaga
- Infraorder: Staphyliniformia
- Family: Staphylinidae
- Genus: Cafius
- Species: C. seminitens

Binomial name
- Cafius seminitens Horn

Species of beetle

Cafius seminitens is a species of large rove beetle in the family Staphylinidae. It is found in North America.
