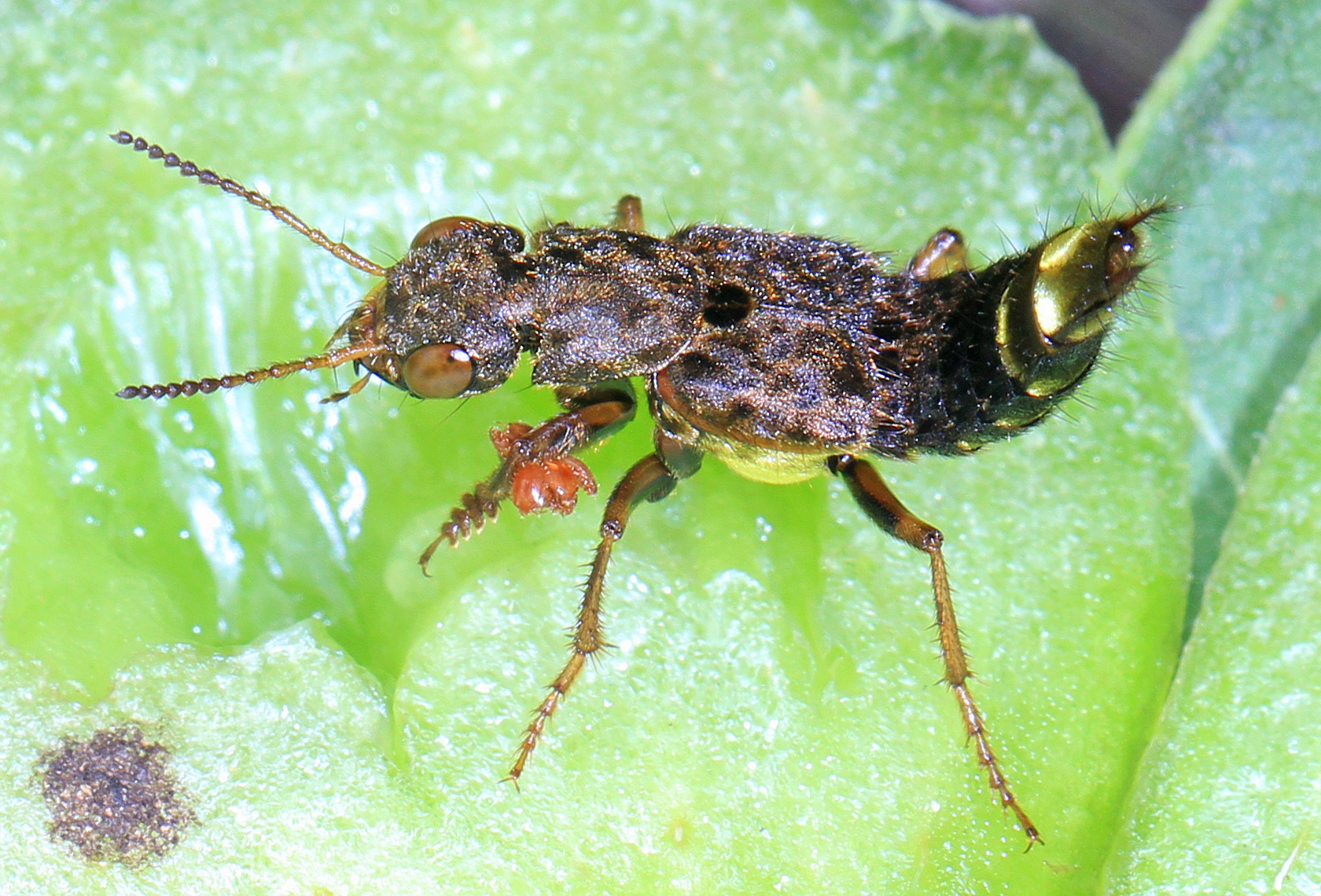

Scientific classification
- Kingdom: Animalia
- Phylum: Arthropoda
- Class: Insecta
- Order: Coleoptera
- Suborder: Polyphaga
- Infraorder: Staphyliniformia
- Family: Staphylinidae
- Genus: Ontholestes
- Species: O. cingulatus

Binomial name
- Ontholestes cingulatus (Gravenhorst, 1802)

= Ontholestes cingulatus =

Species of beetle

Ontholestes cingulatus, known generally as the gold-and-brown rove beetle or carrion beetle, is a species of large rove beetle in the family Staphylinidae.

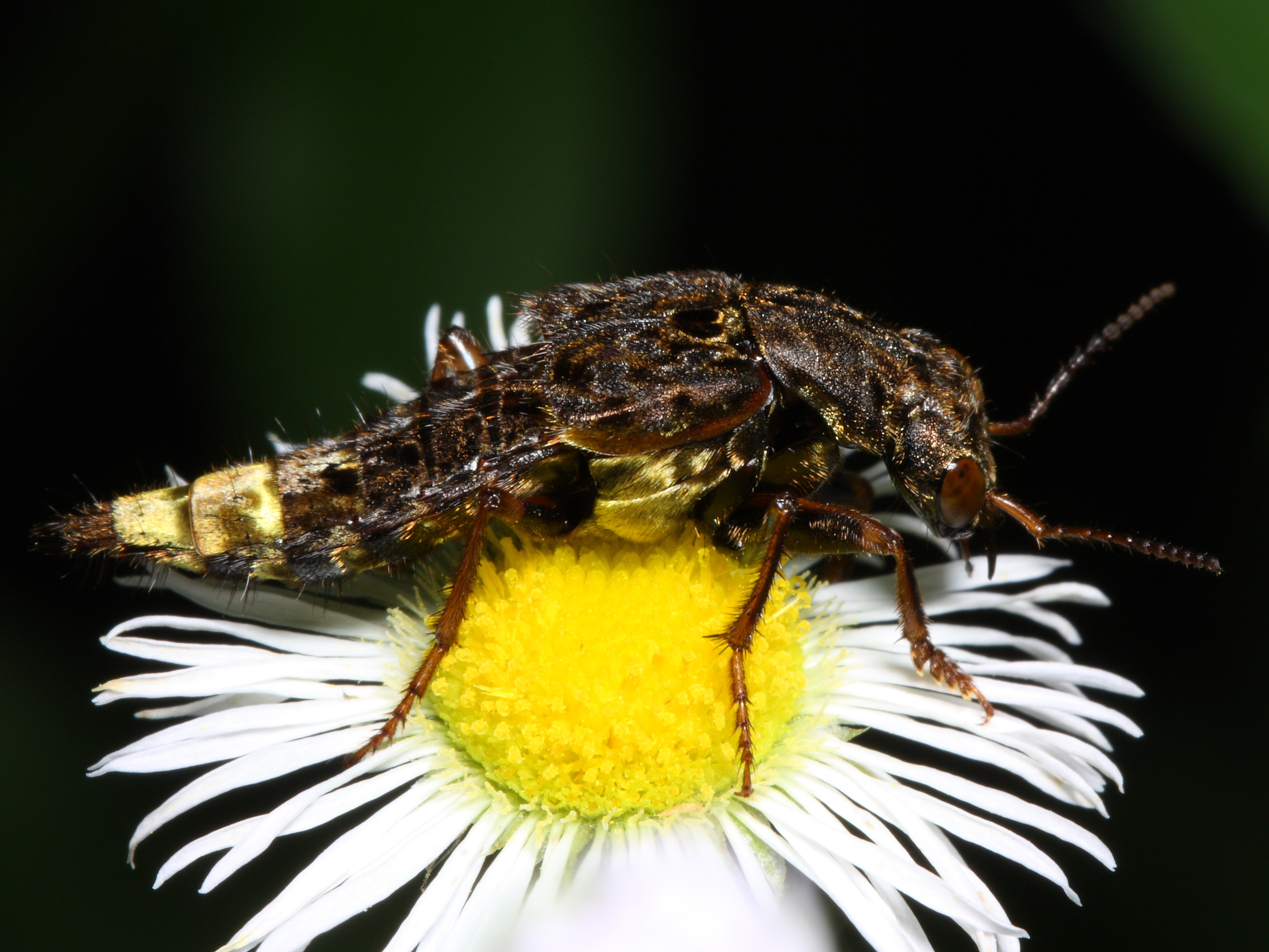
Gold-and-brown rove beetle, Ontholestes cingulatus
