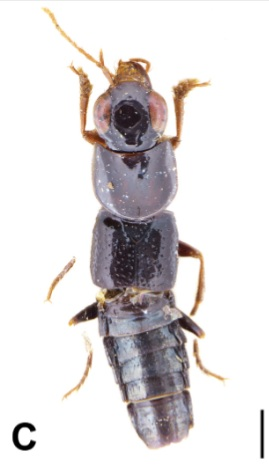

Scientific classification
- Kingdom: Animalia
- Phylum: Arthropoda
- Class: Insecta
- Order: Coleoptera
- Suborder: Polyphaga
- Infraorder: Staphyliniformia
- Family: Staphylinidae
- Genus: Indoquedius
- Species: I. dispersepunctatus

Binomial name
- Indoquedius dispersepunctatus (Scheerpeltz, 1965)

Synonyms
- Quedius (Indoquedius) dispersepunctatus Scheerpeltz, 1965

= Indoquedius dispersepunctatus =

Species of beetle

Indoquedius dispersepunctatus is a species of beetle of the family Staphylinidae. It is found in the Myanmar (Kachin).

== Description ==
Adults have an entirely dark body, with the maxillary and labial palpi testaceous and the antennae testaceous without any obviously darkened segments. The legs are yellowish-brown with dark brown middle and hind femora.
