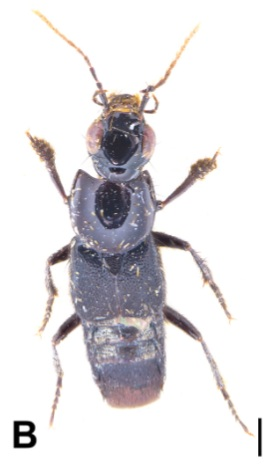

Scientific classification
- Kingdom: Animalia
- Phylum: Arthropoda
- Class: Insecta
- Order: Coleoptera
- Suborder: Polyphaga
- Infraorder: Staphyliniformia
- Family: Staphylinidae
- Genus: Indoquedius
- Species: I. micantiventris

Binomial name
- Indoquedius micantiventris (Scheerpeltz, 1965)

Synonyms
- Quedius (Indoquedius) micantiventris Scheerpeltz, 1965; Indoquedius baliyo Smetana, 1988

= Indoquedius micantiventris =

Species of beetle

Indoquedius micantiventris is a species of beetle of the family Staphylinidae. It is found in the Nepal, India (West Bengal), Myanmar (Kachin) and China (Tibet, Yunnan, Sichuan).
