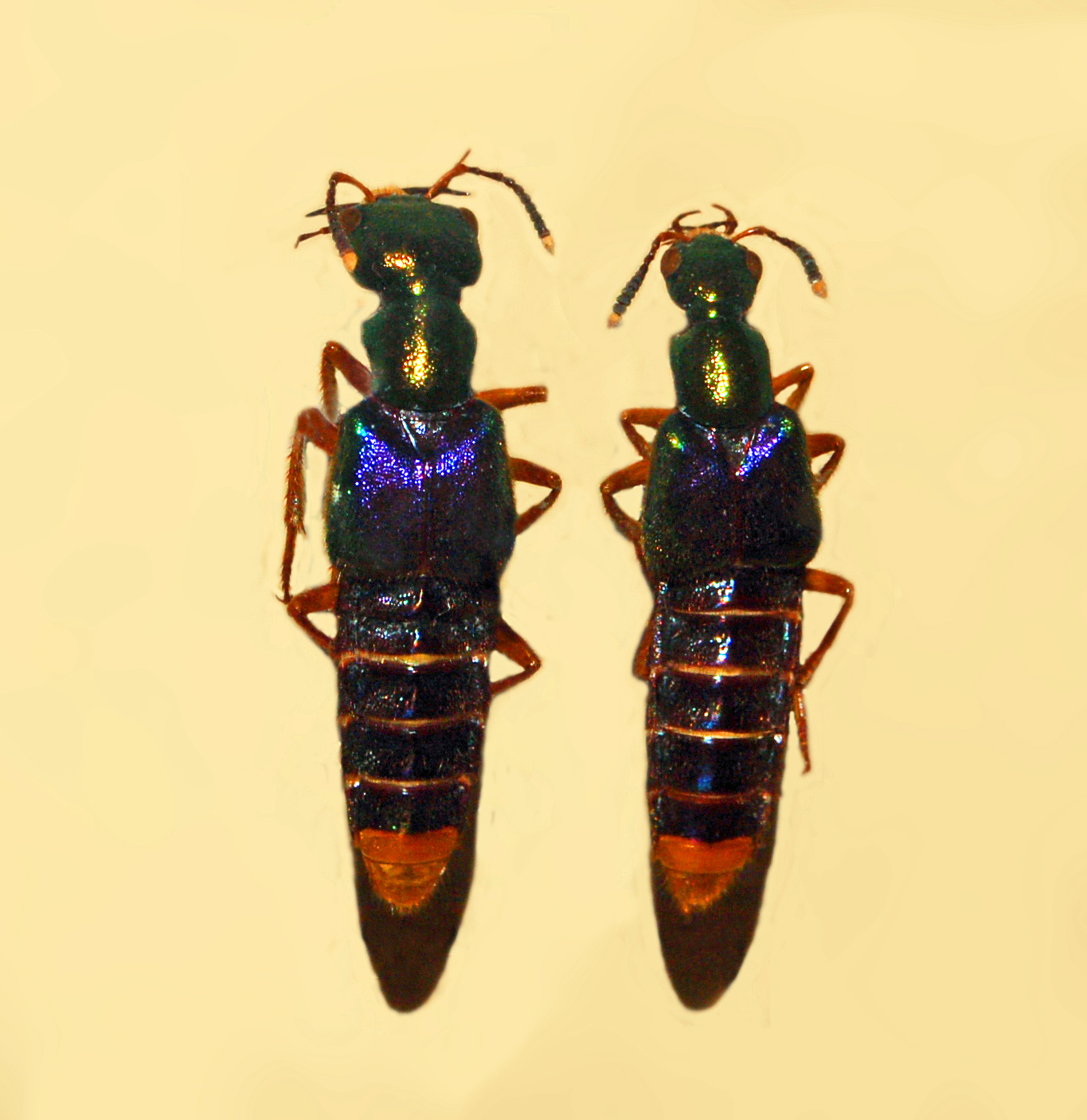
- Actinus imperialis from New Guinea. Male and female.

Scientific classification
- Kingdom: Animalia
- Phylum: Arthropoda
- Clade: Pancrustacea
- Class: Insecta
- Order: Coleoptera
- Suborder: Polyphaga
- Infraorder: Staphyliniformia
- Family: Staphylinidae
- Genus: Actinus
- Species: A. imperialis

Binomial name
- Actinus imperialis Fauvel, 1878

= Actinus imperialis =

Species of beetle

Actinus imperialis is a beetle of family Staphylinidae and subfamily Staphylininae.

== Description ==
Actinus imperialis can reach a length of about 19–22 millimetres (0.75–0.87 in). This colorful staphylinid has very large jaws, metallic green head and pronotum, a strongly convex and punctured pronotum, purplish elytra that are rugose-punctate, an abdomen narrowed posteriorly, and reddish testaceous legs. This beetle has been reported on Cardamom and usually preys on flies attracted to carrion and dung.

== Distribution ==
This species occurs in Papua New Guinea and in Australia's Cape York Peninsula.
