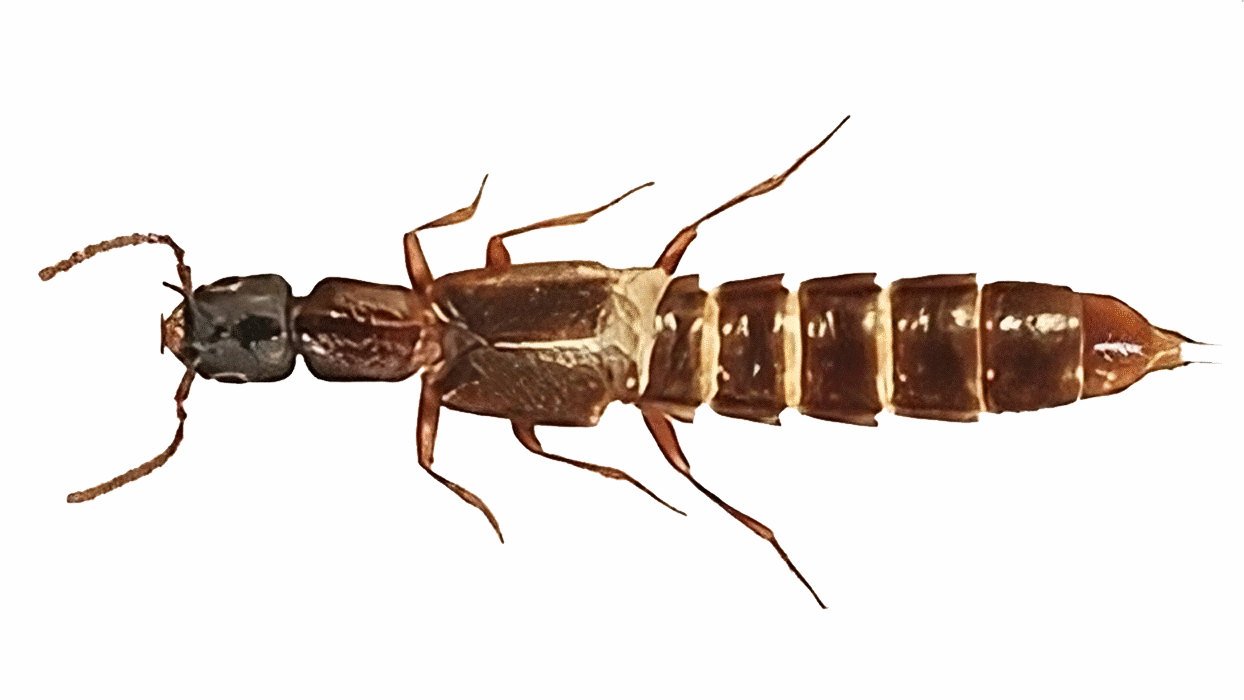

Scientific classification
- Kingdom: Animalia
- Phylum: Arthropoda
- Class: Insecta
- Order: Coleoptera
- Suborder: Polyphaga
- Infraorder: Staphyliniformia
- Family: Staphylinidae
- Genus: Cafius
- Species: C. bistriatus

Binomial name
- Cafius bistriatus (Erichson, 1840)

= Cafius bistriatus =

Species of beetle

Cafius bistriatus is a species of relatively large rove beetle in the family Staphylinidae. It can be found from Quebec and Newfoundland to Florida but not yet in South Carolina or Georgia, and in Texas. East of Florida, it occupies Bermuda and the Bahamas. In the Caribbean, it occupies Antigua and Barbuda (Antigua), Barbados, Dominica, Dominican Republic, Grenada (Carriacou), Guadeloupe, Jamaica, Montserrat, Puerto Rico (including Mona), St. Kitts-Nevis (St. Kitts), St. Lucia, Trinidad & Tobago (both islands), and U.S. Virgin Islands (St. Thomas). It Has been found in the Venezuelan state Falcón. In eastern Mexico, it occurs in Veracruz, Campeche and Quintana Roo. On the Pacific coast, it can be found from California to the Mexican states of Baja California Norte, Baja California Sur, Guerrero, and Sonora. It can grow to be up to 7mm.

There are two known subspecies:

Cafius bistriatus bistriatus (Erichson, 1840). Basionym Philonthus bistriatus Erichson, 1840. Synonym Philonthus bilineatus Erichson, 1840, All of the specimens seen from Atlantic coasts, including the Gulf of Mexico and the Caribbean Sea belong to this, the typical subspecies.

Cafius bistriatus fulgens Frank, 1986. All of the specimens collected from Pacific coasts, including the Sea of Cortez of Mexico, and the inland Salton Sea of California belong to this subspecies.
