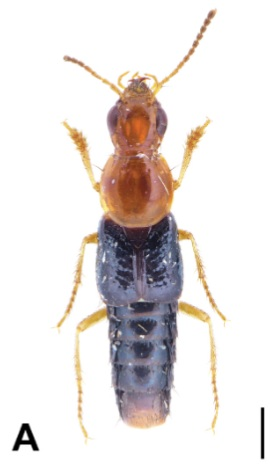

Scientific classification
- Kingdom: Animalia
- Phylum: Arthropoda
- Class: Insecta
- Order: Coleoptera
- Suborder: Polyphaga
- Infraorder: Staphyliniformia
- Family: Staphylinidae
- Genus: Malaisdius
- Species: M. ruficeps

Binomial name
- Malaisdius ruficeps (Scheerpeltz, 1965)

Synonyms
- Quedius (Microsaurus) ruficeps Scheerpeltz, 1965

= Malaisdius ruficeps =

Species of beetle

Malaisdius ruficeps is a species of beetle of the family Staphylinidae. It is found in Myanmar (Kachin).

== Description ==
Adults have a pale orange-red head and pronotum, sharply contrasting with the dark, vaguely bluish elytra and abdomen. The scutellum is very dark red, the abdomen with iridescent reflection.
