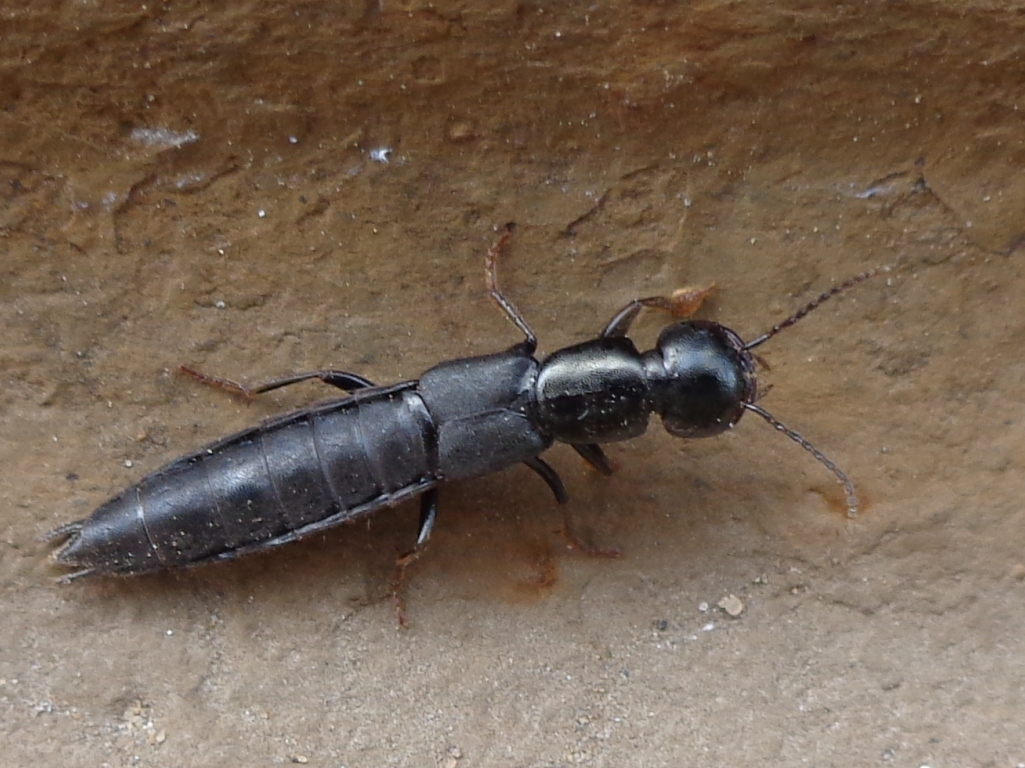

Scientific classification
- Kingdom: Animalia
- Phylum: Arthropoda
- Clade: Pancrustacea
- Class: Insecta
- Order: Coleoptera
- Suborder: Polyphaga
- Infraorder: Staphyliniformia
- Family: Staphylinidae
- Genus: Tasgius
- Species: T. ater

Binomial name
- Tasgius ater (Gravenhorst, 1802)

= Tasgius ater =

Species of beetle

Tasgius ater is a species of large rove beetle in the family Staphylinidae.
