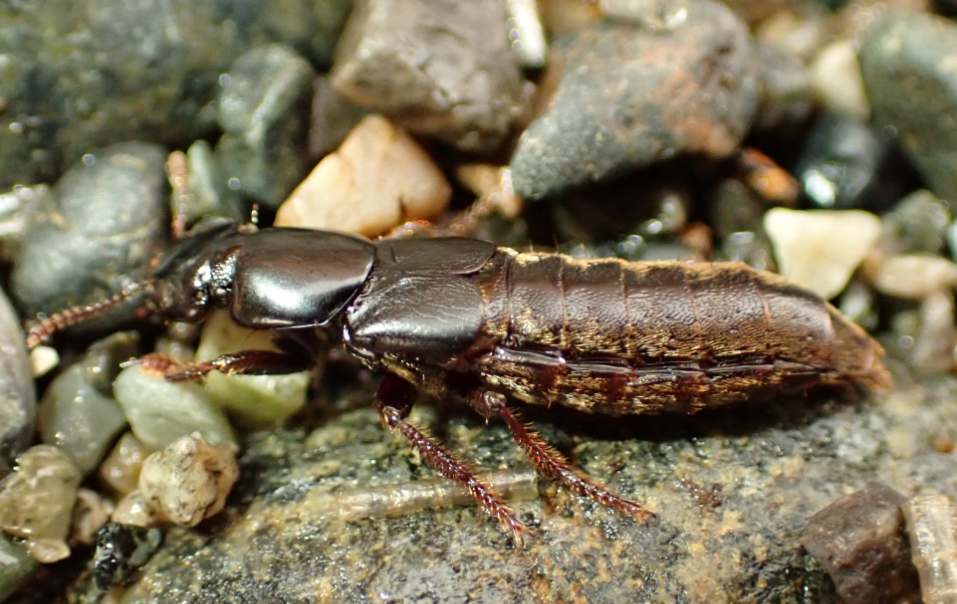
- Hadrotes crassus

Scientific classification
- Kingdom: Animalia
- Phylum: Arthropoda
- Clade: Pancrustacea
- Class: Insecta
- Order: Coleoptera
- Suborder: Polyphaga
- Infraorder: Staphyliniformia
- Family: Staphylinidae
- Subtribe: Staphylinina
- Genus: Hadrotes; Le Conte, 1861

= Hadrotes =

Genus of beetles

Hadrotes is a genus of large rove beetles in the family Staphylinidae. There are at least three described species in Hadrotes.

== Species ==
These three species belong to the genus Hadrotes:

- Hadrotes crassus Mannerheim
- Hadrotes extensus LeConte, 1861
- Hadrotes wakefieldi Cameron, 1945
