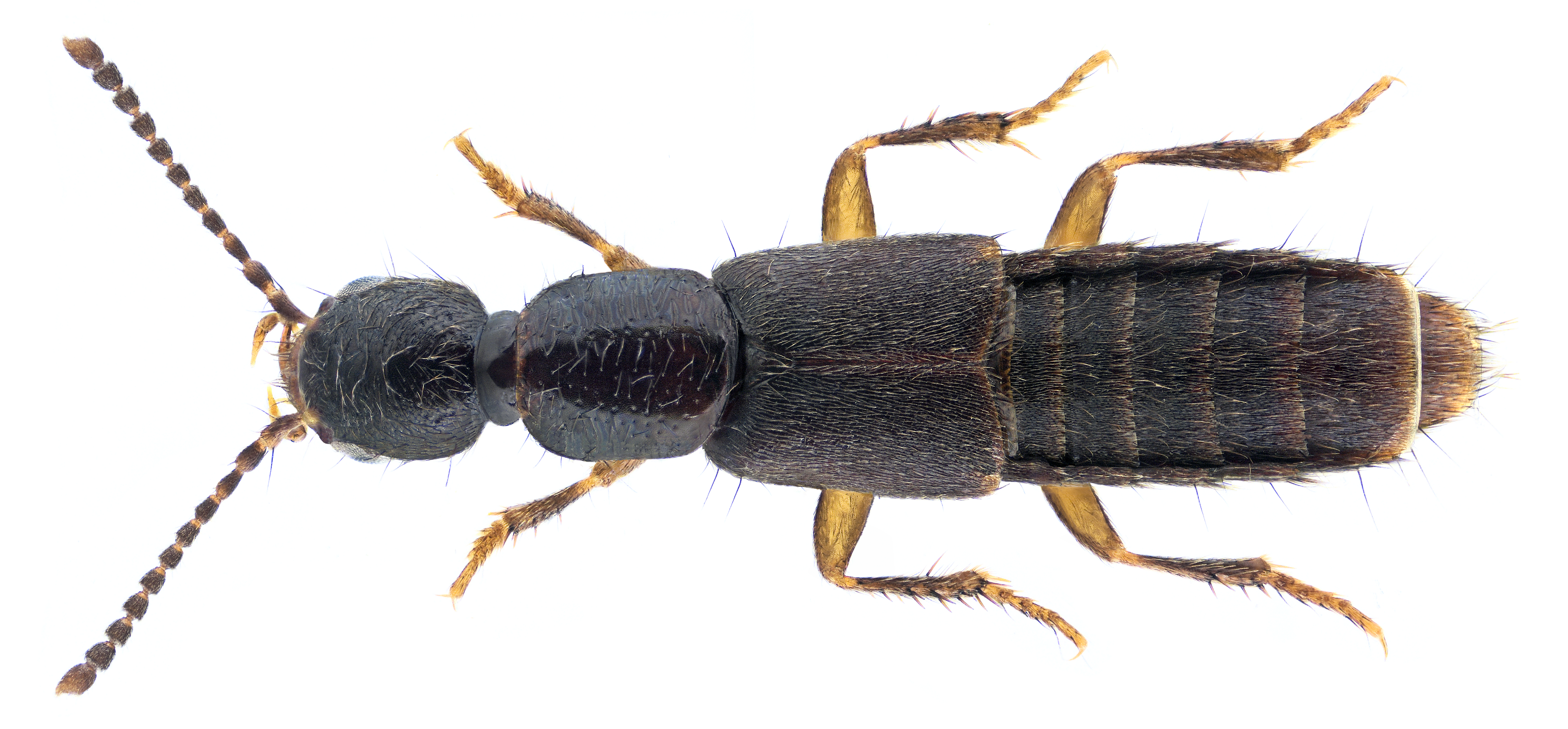
- Erichsonius cinerascens (Gravenhorst, 1802)

Scientific classification
- Kingdom: Animalia
- Phylum: Arthropoda
- Class: Insecta
- Order: Coleoptera
- Suborder: Polyphaga
- Infraorder: Staphyliniformia
- Family: Staphylinidae
- Genus: Erichsonius; Fauvel, 1874

= Erichsonius =

Genus of beetles

Erichsonius is a genus of beetles belonging to the family Staphylinidae.

The species of this genus are found in Europe and Northern America.

Species:

- Erichsonius aequiventris Tottenham, 1956
- Erichsonius affinis (Cameron, 1926)
