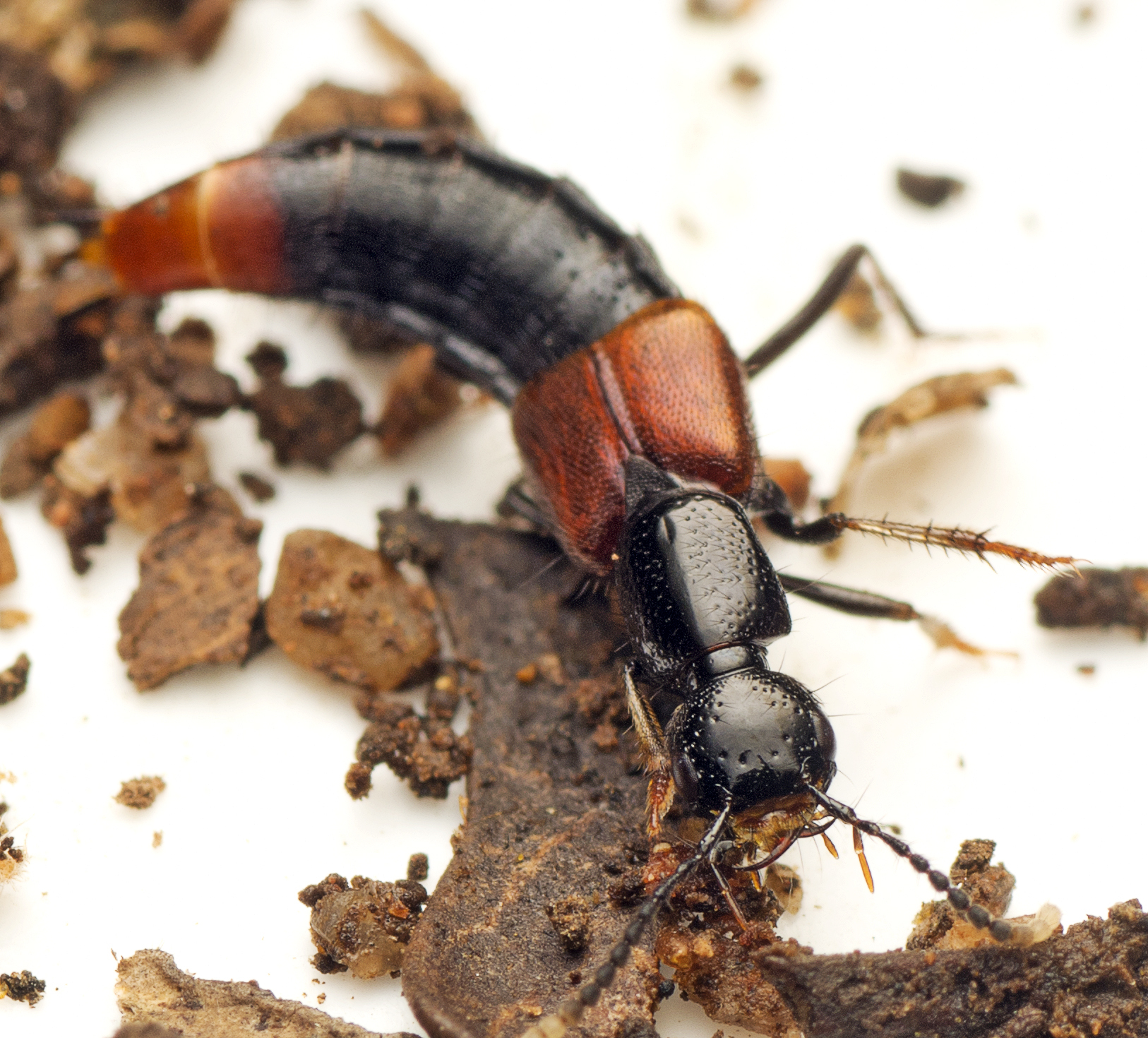
- Hesperus australis

Scientific classification
- Kingdom: Animalia
- Phylum: Arthropoda
- Class: Insecta
- Order: Coleoptera
- Suborder: Polyphaga
- Infraorder: Staphyliniformia
- Family: Staphylinidae
- Tribe: Staphylinini
- Genus: Hesperus; Fauvel, 1874

= Hesperus (beetle) =

Genus of beetles

Hesperus is a genus of beetles in the tribe Staphylinini. The genus has a nearly worldwide distribution with around 200 named species.
