= Gabronthus =

Scientific classification
- Kingdom: Animalia
- Phylum: Arthropoda
- Class: Insecta
- Order: Coleoptera
- Suborder: Polyphaga
- Infraorder: Staphyliniformia
- Family: Staphylinidae
- Genus: Gabronthus; Tottenham, 1955

Genus of beetles

Gabronthus is a genus of beetles belonging to the family Staphylinidae.

The genus has almost cosmopolitan distribution.

Species:

- Gabronthus allardi Levasseur, 1964
- Gabronthus alluaudanus (Jeannel & Paulian, 1945)
