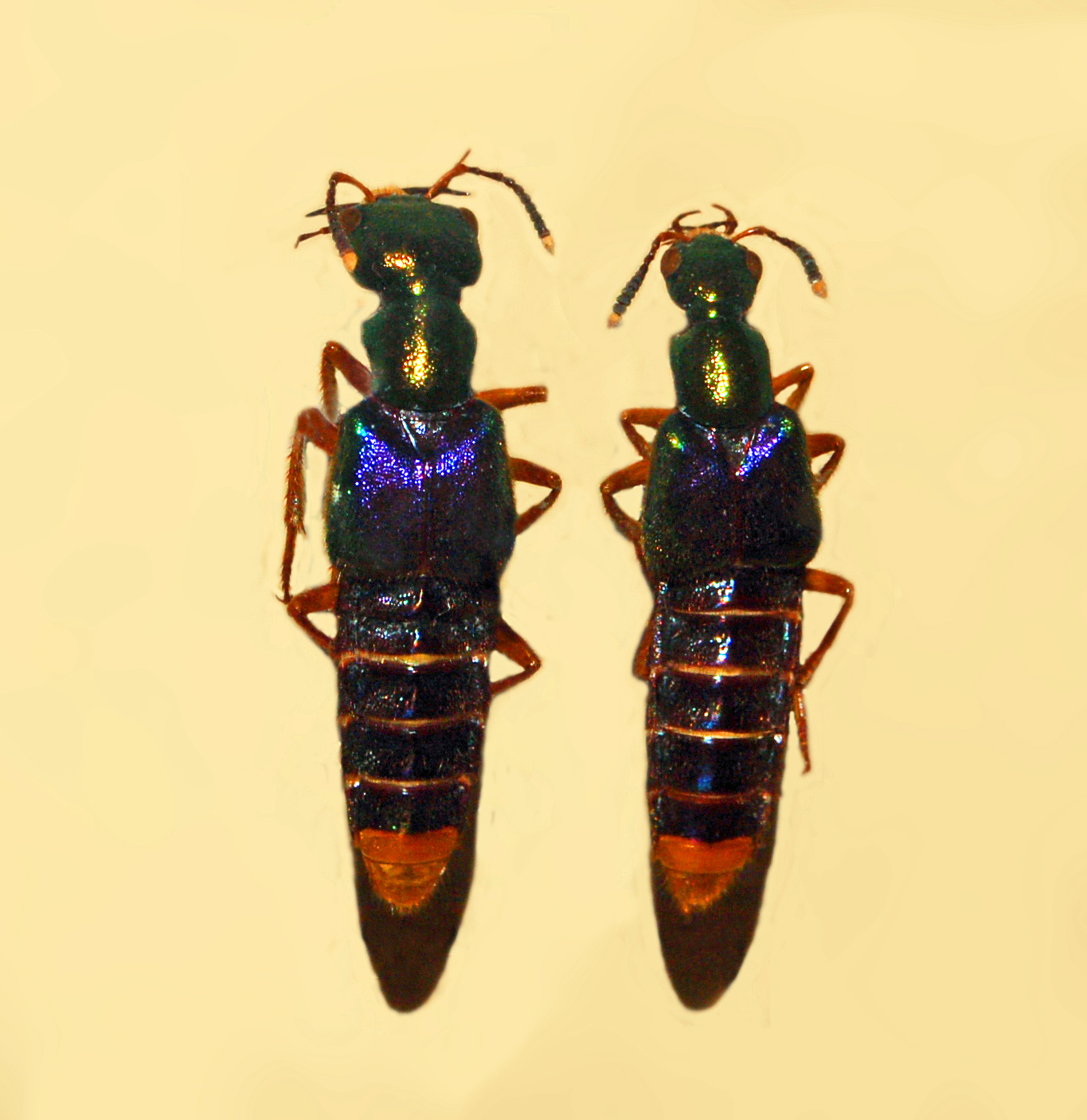
- Actinus imperialis from New Guinea. Male and female.

Scientific classification
- Kingdom: Animalia
- Phylum: Arthropoda
- Clade: Pancrustacea
- Class: Insecta
- Order: Coleoptera
- Suborder: Polyphaga
- Infraorder: Staphyliniformia
- Family: Staphylinidae
- Subfamily: Staphylininae
- Genus: Actinus; Fauvel, 1878

= Actinus =

Genus of beetles

Actinus is a genus of beetles of the Staphylinidae family, Staphylininae subfamily, first described by Charles Adolphe Albert Fauvel in 1878.

== Species ==
From Biolib:

- Actinus imperialis Fauvel, 1878
- Actinus macleayi Olliff, 1887
