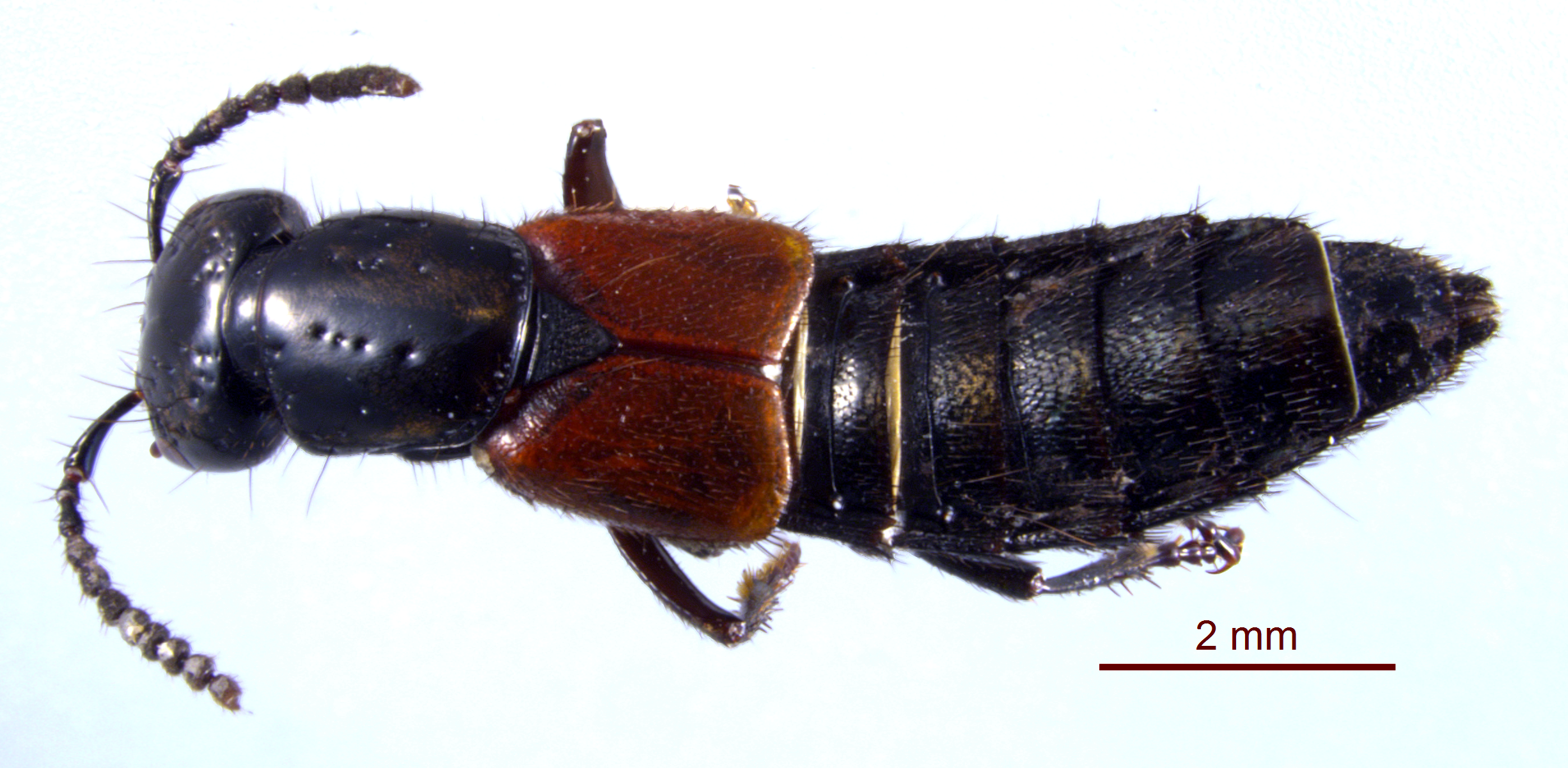

Scientific classification
- Kingdom: Animalia
- Phylum: Arthropoda
- Class: Insecta
- Order: Coleoptera
- Suborder: Polyphaga
- Infraorder: Staphyliniformia
- Family: Staphylinidae
- Subtribe: Philonthina
- Genus: Belonuchus; Nordmann, 1837

= Belonuchus =

Genus of beetles

Belonuchus is a genus of large rove beetles in the family Staphylinidae. There are more than 30 described species in Belonuchus.

== Species ==
These 38 species belong to the genus Belonuchus:

- Belonuchus agilis
- Belonuchus alternatus Sharp, 1885
- Belonuchus amplus Blackwelder
- Belonuchus arizonicus Casey
- Belonuchus bidens Sharp, 1885
- Belonuchus boops Sharp, 1885
- Belonuchus boxi Blackwelder
- Belonuchus bugnioni Fauvel, 1901
- Belonuchus cacao Blackwelder
- Belonuchus cifuentesi Rodríguez & Navarrete-Heredia, 2016
- Belonuchus cognatus Sharp, 1885
- Belonuchus danforthi Blackwelder
- Belonuchus dejectus Sharp, 1885
- Belonuchus docilis Sharp, 1885
- Belonuchus dominicus Blackwelder
- Belonuchus ephippiatus Say, 1834
- Belonuchus hispaniolus Blackwelder
- Belonuchus jacobianus Casey
- Belonuchus laticeps Casey
- Belonuchus mimeticus Sharp, 1885
- Belonuchus moquinus Casey
- Belonuchus oakleyi Blackwelder
- Belonuchus pallidus Casey
- Belonuchus panamensis Sharp, 1885
- Belonuchus pictipennis Sharp, 1885
- Belonuchus pollens Sharp, 1885
- Belonuchus punctiventris Casey
- Belonuchus quadrifer Casey
- Belonuchus rufipennis (Fabricius, 1801)
- Belonuchus rufoniger Fauvel, 1895
- Belonuchus similis Sharp, 1885
- Belonuchus simplex Sharp, 1885
- Belonuchus stenoderus Sharp, 1885
- Belonuchus texanus Casey
- Belonuchus trinitatus Blackwelder
- Belonuchus variolosus Solsky, 1870
- Musicoderus cephalotes Sharp, 1885
- Musicoderus gracilis Sharp, 1885
