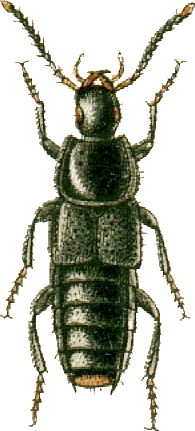
- Euryporus picipes

Scientific classification
- Kingdom: Animalia
- Phylum: Arthropoda
- Class: Insecta
- Order: Coleoptera
- Suborder: Polyphaga
- Infraorder: Staphyliniformia
- Family: Staphylinidae
- Genus: Euryporus; Erichson, 1839

= Euryporus =

Genus of beetles

Euryporus is a genus of beetles belonging to the family Staphylinidae.

Species:

- Euryporus picipes
