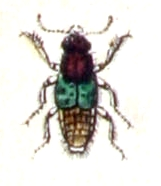
- Abemus chloropterus

Scientific classification
- Domain: Eukaryota
- Kingdom: Animalia
- Phylum: Arthropoda
- Class: Insecta
- Order: Coleoptera
- Suborder: Polyphaga
- Infraorder: Staphyliniformia
- Family: Staphylinidae
- Genus: Abemus; Mulsant & Rey, 1876

= Abemus =

Genus of beetles

Abemus is a genus of beetles belonging to the family Staphylinidae.

The species of this genus are found in Europe and Africa.

Species:

- Abemus africanus (Cameron, 1942)
- Abemus chloropterus (Creutzer, 1796)
- Abemus chloropterus (Panzer, 1796)
- Abemus hebraeus (Smetana, 1978)
- Abemus hemichrysis (Fauvel, 1905)
- Abemus hottentottus (Nordmann, 1837)
- Abemus olivaceus (Cameron, 1928)
- Abemus vethi (Bernhauer, 1915)
