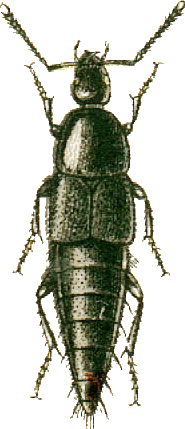
- Acylophorus glaberrimus

Scientific classification
- Kingdom: Animalia
- Phylum: Arthropoda
- Clade: Pancrustacea
- Class: Insecta
- Order: Coleoptera
- Suborder: Polyphaga
- Infraorder: Staphyliniformia
- Family: Staphylinidae
- Genus: Acylophorus; Nordmann, 1837

= Acylophorus =

Genus of beetles

Acylophorus is a large genus of beetles containing over 140 species belonging to the family Staphylinidae.

The genus has cosmopolitan distribution.

== Species: ==
The genus contains the following species:

- Acylophorus acufer Lott, 2012
- Acylophorus acuminatus Sharp, 1876
- Acylophorus aenescens Blackwelder, 1943
- Acylophorus agilis Smetana, 1971
- Acylophorus allardi Levasseur, 1968
- Acylophorus alternans Smetana, 1971
- Acylophorus anguliceps Bierig, 1938
- Acylophorus angusticeps Sharp, 1876
- Acylophorus antennalis Cameron, 1932
- Acylophorus asperatus Fauvel, 1878
- Acylophorus asperipennis Smetana, 1967
- Acylophorus bafutensis Levasseur, 1968
- Acylophorus balchhi Smetana, 1988
- Acylophorus beesoni Cameron, 1926
- Acylophorus bipunctatus Cameron, 1920
- Acylophorus borneensis Cameron, 1933
- Acylophorus breviceps Cameron, 1938
- Acylophorus bruchi Bernhauer, 1912
- Acylophorus bumbunae Bordoni, 1994
- Acylophorus capensis Cameron, 1945
- Acylophorus caseyi Leng, 1920
- Acylophorus cephalotes Bierig, 1938
- Acylophorus charaa Smetana, 1988
- Acylophorus chillo Smetana, 1988
- Acylophorus chontalenus Sharp, 1884
- Acylophorus collarti Cameron, 1935
- Acylophorus congener Bierig, 1938
- Acylophorus congoensis Cameron, 1932
- Acylophorus daai Smetana, 1988
- Acylophorus dampfi Bierig, 1938
- Acylophorus dankalensis Bordoni, 1994
- Acylophorus darlingtoni Blackwelder, 1943
- Acylophorus delphinus Fauvel, 1905
- Acylophorus densipennis Bernhauer, 1929
- Acylophorus densus LeConte, J. L., 1878
- Acylophorus derougemonti Janák, 2018
- Acylophorus didymus Sharp, 1884
- Acylophorus dissimilis Smetana, 1971
- Acylophorus fallax Smetana, 1971
- Acylophorus femoralis Nordmann, 1837
- Acylophorus filius Smetana, 1971
- Acylophorus flavicollis Sachse, 1852
- Acylophorus flavicornis Cameron, 1918
- Acylophorus flavipes Motschulsky, 1858
- Acylophorus fordi Last, 1987
- Acylophorus franckei Wendeler, 1956
- Acylophorus furcatus Motschulsky, 1858
- Acylophorus gilensis LeConte, J. L., 1863
- Acylophorus glaberrimus (Herbst, 1784)
- Acylophorus grandis Bernhauer, 1929
- Acylophorus hatuey Bierig, 1938
- Acylophorus hayashii Smetana, 1995
- Acylophorus honshuensis Dvořák, R., 1957
- Acylophorus hova Janák, 2018
- Acylophorus hubrichi Bernhauer, 1927
- Acylophorus hwang Smetana, 1995
- †Acylophorus immotus Scudder, 1900
- Acylophorus indignus Blackburn, 1888
- Acylophorus insulanus Bierig, 1938
- Acylophorus iridescens Sharp, 1876
- Acylophorus iridiventris Bernhauer, 1927
- Acylophorus jalapanus Schubert, K., 1909
- Acylophorus janaki Lott, 2012
- Acylophorus javanus Cameron, 1937
- Acylophorus kambuiensis Bordoni, 1994
- Acylophorus khairo Smetana, 1988
- Acylophorus kraatzi Bernhauer, 1908
- Acylophorus lecontei Duvivier, 1883
- Acylophorus leechi Smetana, 1971
- Acylophorus lindbergi Scheerpeltz, 1958
- Acylophorus lomaensis Levasseur, 1971
- Acylophorus longicornis Erichson, 1840
- Acylophorus longistylus Casey, 1915
- Acylophorus lualabaensis Levasseur, 1968
- Acylophorus luctuosus Solsky, 1868
- Acylophorus maculicornis Cameron, 1918
- Acylophorus madecassus Janák, 2018
- Acylophorus makhoreae Lott, 2010
- Acylophorus malaisei Scheerpeltz, 1965
- Acylophorus mareei Bernhauer, 1943
- Acylophorus mauritianus Janák, 2018
- Acylophorus meridioafricanus Janák, 2011
- Acylophorus metallicus Blackwelder, 1943
- Acylophorus methneri Bernhauer, 1917
- Acylophorus mexicanus Sharp, 1884
- Acylophorus micans Lott, 2010
- Acylophorus microcephalus Cameron, 1932
- Acylophorus microcerus Fauvel, 1895
- Acylophorus minor Lott, 2010
- Acylophorus minutus Jarrige, 1965
- Acylophorus montanus Janák, 2018
- Acylophorus muscorum Jarrige, 1965
- Acylophorus nepa Bierig, 1938
- Acylophorus nitens Lott, 2010
- Acylophorus novaguinensis (Last, 1975)
- Acylophorus obscurus Cameron, 1942
- Acylophorus oculifer Bierig, 1938
- Acylophorus okasaensis (Last, 1975)
- Acylophorus orientalis Fauvel, 1907
- Acylophorus pacificus Bierig, 1938
- Acylophorus palpalis Sharp, 1884
- Acylophorus parviceps Sharp, 1884
- Acylophorus persimilis Cameron, 1950
- Acylophorus picipes Erichson, 1840
- Acylophorus planatus Sharp, 1884
- Acylophorus plaumanni Wendeler, 1956
- Acylophorus princeps Smetana, 1971
- Acylophorus pronus Erichson, 1840
- Acylophorus proximus Sharp, 1884
- Acylophorus puncticeps Fauvel, 1895
- Acylophorus punctiventris Sharp, 1876
- Acylophorus punctulatus Bierig, 1938
- Acylophorus pusillus Smetana, 1973
- Acylophorus raato Smetana, 1988
- Acylophorus richteri Bernhauer, 1912
- Acylophorus rossii Bordoni, 1994
- Acylophorus rotundicollis Cameron, 1918
- Acylophorus ruficeps Cameron, 1941
- Acylophorus ruficollis Motschulsky, 1858
- Acylophorus rufipennis Cameron, 1959
- Acylophorus salifi Lott, 2010
- Acylophorus sandersoni Smetana, 1971
- Acylophorus schmidti Bierig, 1938
- Acylophorus schuelkei Smetana, 2017
- Acylophorus scutellaris Bernhauer, 1916
- Acylophorus setiger Lott, 2010
- Acylophorus sexualis Smetana, 2017
- Acylophorus similis Wendeler, 1956
- Acylophorus simplex Sharp, 1884
- Acylophorus siyo Smetana, 1988
- Acylophorus smetanai Janák, 2011
- Acylophorus sogai Jarrige, 1965
- Acylophorus tibialis Cameron, 1932
- Acylophorus trigonocephalus Cameron, 1950
- Acylophorus trinitatis Blackwelder, 1943
- Acylophorus tristis Jarrige, 1965
- Acylophorus tshuapensis Lott, 2010
- Acylophorus uhligi Lott, 2012
- Acylophorus usambarae Bernhauer, 1917
- Acylophorus versicolor Sharp, 1887
- Acylophorus wagenschieberi Kiesenwetter, 1850
- Acylophorus williamsi Bierig, 1938
- Acylophorus wrasei Smetana, 2005
- Acylophorus zdenae Smetana, 1978
- Acylophorus ziloensis Levasseur, 1968
