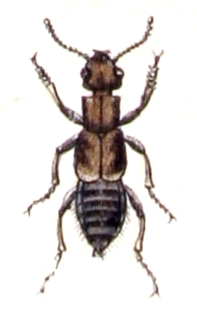
- Dinothenarus fossor, from Calwer's Käferbuch

Scientific classification
- Kingdom: Animalia
- Phylum: Arthropoda
- Class: Insecta
- Order: Coleoptera
- Suborder: Polyphaga
- Infraorder: Staphyliniformia
- Family: Staphylinidae
- Genus: Dinothenarus; Thomson, 1858

= Dinothenarus =

Genus of beetles

Dinothenarus is a genus of beetles belonging to the family Staphylinidae.

The species of this genus are found in Europe and Northern America.

Species:

- Dinothenarus amisadaiae Santiago-Jiménez, 2008
- Dinothenarus arrosus (Eppelsheim, 1890)
