= Wreck of the Hesperus (band) =

Irish doom metal band

- Origin: Dublin, Ireland
- Genres: Funeral doom
- Years active: 2004–present
- Label: Aesthetic Death
- Members: Andy Cunningham; Count Rodge; Ray Keenaghan

Wreck of the Hesperus is an Irish doom metal band based in Dublin. The band first played together in January 2004 and they recorded their first demo, a four-track effort entitled Terminal Dirge in June 2004. The follow-up Eulogy for the Sewer Dwellers was released in 2005.

The band released their first full-length album The Sunken Threshold in October 2006. The band's website reports that split albums with Irish doom metal bands Mourning Beloveth and De Novissimus are in the pipeline, with the former to be expected in 2007.

July 2011 saw the release of the band's second album, Light Rotting Out.

== Band members ==
- Andy Cunningham – guitar, vocals
- Count Rodge – bass
- Rmongo – drums

== Discography ==
- Terminal Dirge (2004)
- Eulogy for the Sewer Dwellers (2005)
- The Sunken Threshold (2006)
- The Dilapidated Sky (2008)
- Rotism (2008)
- De Novissimis/Wreck of the Hesperus split 10" (2008)
- Mourning Beloveth/Wreck of the Hesperus split 10" (2009)
- Dungeon Floor (2010)
- Light Rotting Out (2011)
- Terminal Eulogy (2012)
- Long Streak of Misery (2014)
- Sediment (2016)
