= List of Philonthus species =

This is a list of 251 species in Philonthus, a genus of large rove beetles in the family Staphylinidae.

== Philonthus species ==
- Philonthus aberrans Cameron, 1932^{g}
- Philonthus acromyrmecis Scheerpeltz, 1976^{g}
- Philonthus aculeatus Coiffait, 1963^{g}
- Philonthus addendus Sharp, 1867^{g}
- Philonthus aeneipennis Boheman^{g}
- Philonthus aequalis Horn, 1884^{g}
- Philonthus aerosus Kiesenwetter, 1851^{g}
- Philonthus alberti Schillhammer, 2000^{g}
- Philonthus albipes (Gravenhorst, 1802)^{g}
- Philonthus alcyoneus Erichson, 1840^{g}
- Philonthus alpinus Eppelsheim, 1875^{g}
- Philonthus alterius Cameron, 1951^{g}
- Philonthus amnicola Gistel, 1857^{g}
- Philonthus analis Erichson, 1840^{g}
- Philonthus anguinus Fauvel, 1874^{g}
- Philonthus antipodum Fauvel, 1877^{g}
- Philonthus aprilinus Gistel, 1857^{g}
- Philonthus archangelicus Poppius, 1908^{g}
- Philonthus argus Herman^{g}
- Philonthus asper Horn, 1884^{g b}
- Philonthus assimilis Nordmann, 1837^{g}
- Philonthus atratoides Coiffait, 1963^{g}
- Philonthus atratus (Gravenhorst, 1802)^{g}
- Philonthus aurulentus Horn, 1884^{g b}
- Philonthus australis Cameron, 1943^{g}
- Philonthus bicolor Fauvel, 1903^{g}
- Philonthus bicoloristylus Chani-Posse^{g}
- Philonthus biskrensis Fagel, 1957^{g}
- Philonthus blossius Smetana, 1995^{g}
- Philonthus bonariensis Bernhauer, 1909^{g}
- Philonthus boreas Smetana, 1995^{g b}
- Philonthus brachypterus Solsky, 1872^{g}
- Philonthus bruchianus Chani-Posse^{g}
- Philonthus busiris Smetana, 1995^{g}
- Philonthus caeruleipennis ^{g b}
- Philonthus caerulescens (Lacordaire, 1835)^{g}
- Philonthus carbonarius (Gravenhorst, 1802)^{g}
- Philonthus caucasicus Nordmann, 1837^{g b}
- Philonthus caurinus Horn, 1884^{g}
- Philonthus cautus ^{b}
- Philonthus cerambus Smetana, 1995^{g}
- Philonthus chalceus Stephens, 1832^{g}
- Philonthus chopardi Cameron, 1950^{g}
- Philonthus cochleatus Scheerpeltz, 1937^{g}
- Philonthus coenicola Gistel, 1857^{g}
- Philonthus cognatus Stephens, 1832^{g b}
- Philonthus confinis Strand, 1941^{g}
- Philonthus coprophilus Jarrige, 1949^{g}
- Philonthus coracion Peyerimhoff, 1902^{g}
- Philonthus corruscus (Gravenhorst, 1802)^{g}
- Philonthus corvinus Erichson, 1839^{g}
- Philonthus couleensis Hatch, 1957^{g b}
- Philonthus crassicornis Fauvel, 1895^{g}
- Philonthus cribriventris Bernhauer, 1912^{g}
- Philonthus crotchi Horn, 1884^{g}
- Philonthus cruentatus (Gmelin, 1790)^{g b}
- Philonthus cunctans Horn, 1884^{g}
- Philonthus cunicularius Gistel, 1857^{g}
- Philonthus cyanipennis (Fabricius, 1793)^{g}
- Philonthus davus Smetana, 1995^{g}
- Philonthus debilis (Gravenhorst, 1802)^{g b}
- Philonthus decorus (Gravenhorst, 1802)^{g}
- Philonthus delicatulus Boheman, 1858^{g}
- Philonthus derennei Drugmand, 1987^{g}
- Philonthus dilutipes Fauvel, 1898^{g}
- Philonthus dimidiatipennis Erichson, 1840^{g}
- Philonthus discoideus (Gravenhorst, 1802)^{i c g}
- Philonthus distans Horn, 1884^{g}
- Philonthus duplicatus Bernhauer & Schubert, 1914^{g}
- Philonthus ebeninus (Gravenhorst, 1802)^{g}
- Philonthus ephippium Nordmann, 1837^{g}
- Philonthus eremus Gistel, 1857^{g}
- Philonthus erraticus Nordmann, 1837^{g}
- Philonthus eustilbus Kraat, 1859^{g}
- Philonthus explorator Cameron, 1932^{g}
- Philonthus fauvelianus Bernhauer^{g}
- Philonthus fenestratus Fauvel, 1872^{g}
- Philonthus ferreipennis Horn, 1884^{g}
- Philonthus figulus Erichson, 1840^{g}
- Philonthus flavibasis Casey, 1915^{g}
- Philonthus flavipes Kraatz, 1859^{g}
- Philonthus flavocinctus Motschulsky, 1858^{g}
- Philonthus flavolimbatus Erichson, 1840^{g}
- Philonthus flumineus Casey, 1915^{g b}
- Philonthus foetidus Cameron, 1932^{g}
- Philonthus formosae Bernhauer^{g}
- Philonthus frigidus Märkel & Kiesenwetter, 1848^{g}
- Philonthus fulcinius Smetana, 1995^{g}
- Philonthus fumarius (Gravenhorst, 1806)^{g}
- Philonthus furcifer Renkonen, 1937^{g}
- Philonthus furvus Nordmann, 1837^{g}
- Philonthus fusiformis Melsheimer, 1844^{g}
- Philonthus gagates Mulsant & Rey, 1876^{g}
- Philonthus gaudens Tottenham, 1939^{g}
- Philonthus gemellus Kraatz, 1859^{g}
- Philonthus gopheri Hubbard, 1894^{b} (gopher tortoise rove beetle)
- Philonthus gracilior Casey, 1915^{g}
- Philonthus grandicollis Horn, 1884^{g}
- Philonthus gratus Cameron, 1943^{g}
- Philonthus gyllenhali Gistel, 1857^{g}
- Philonthus haddeni Bierig, 1932^{i c g}
- Philonthus haemorrhoidalis MacLeay, 1873^{g}
- Philonthus heinlii Gistel, 1857^{g}
- Philonthus hepaticus Er.^{i c g b}
- Philonthus heterodoxus Mulsant & Rey, 1876^{g}
- Philonthus hudsonicus Horn, 1884^{g}
- Philonthus humilis Erichson, 1840^{g}
- Philonthus hybridus Cameron, 1930^{g}
- Philonthus hyperboreus ^{g}
- Philonthus intermedius (Lacordaire, 1835)^{g}
- Philonthus janus Smetana, 1995^{g}
- Philonthus japonicus Sharp, 1874^{g}
- Philonthus jurecekianus Bohac & Hromadka, 1980^{g}
- Philonthus jurgans Tottenham, 1937^{g}
- Philonthus juvenilis Peyron, 1858^{g}
- Philonthus kaszabi Smetana, 1967^{g}
- Philonthus kiyoyamai Hayashi, 1993b^{g}
- Philonthus laetus Heer, 1839^{g}
- Philonthus laevicollis (Lacordaire, 1835)^{g}
- Philonthus laminatus (Creutzer, 1799)^{g}
- Philonthus lecontei Horn, 1884^{g}
- Philonthus lederi Eppelsheim, 1893^{g}
- Philonthus leechensis Hatch, 1957^{g}
- Philonthus lepidus (Gravenhorst, 1802)^{g}
- Philonthus lewisius Sharp, 1974^{g}
- Philonthus lindbergi Scheerpeltz, 1958^{g}
- Philonthus lindrothi Smetana, 1965^{g}
- Philonthus linki Solsky, 1866^{g}
- Philonthus littorinus Gistel, 1857^{g}
- Philonthus lomatus Erichson, 1840^{g b}
- Philonthus longicornis Stephens, 1832^{i c g}
- Philonthus luxurians Erichson, 1840^{g}
- Philonthus madurensis Bernhauer^{g}
- Philonthus maindroni Fauvel, 1903^{g}
- Philonthus mannerheimi Fauvel, 1868^{g}
- Philonthus marcidus Wollaston, 1864^{g}
- Philonthus mareki Coiffait, 1967^{g}
- Philonthus merops Smetana, 1963^{g}
- Philonthus micans (Gravenhorst, 1802)^{g}
- Philonthus micantoides Benick & Lohse, 1956^{g}
- Philonthus mimus Smetana, 1959^{g}
- Philonthus minutus Boheman^{g}
- Philonthus moldavicus Wendeler, 1924^{g}
- Philonthus monaeses Smetana, 1995^{g b}
- Philonthus montanus Bernhauer, 1934^{g}
- Philonthus montivagus Heer, 1839^{g}
- Philonthus morosus Casey, 1915^{g}
- Philonthus nemorosus Gistel, 1857^{g}
- Philonthus neonatus Smetana, 1965^{g}
- Philonthus nigriceps Eppelsheim, 1885^{g}
- Philonthus nigrita (Gravenhorst, 1806)^{g}
- Philonthus nimbicola Fauvel, 1874^{g}
- Philonthus nitidicollis (Lacordaire, 1835)^{g}
- Philonthus nitidus (Fabricius, 1787)^{g}
- Philonthus notabilis Kraatz^{g}
- Philonthus nudus Sharp, 1874^{g}
- Philonthus oblitus Jarrige, 1951^{g}
- Philonthus obscurus Gravenhorst, 1802^{g}
- Philonthus occidentalis Horn, 1884^{g}
- Philonthus olfactorius Gistel, 1857^{g}
- Philonthus onthomanes Gistel, 1857^{g}
- Philonthus opacipennis Notman, 1919^{g}
- Philonthus paederoides (Motschulsky, 1858)^{g}
- Philonthus paganettii Linke, 1915^{g}
- Philonthus palliatus (Gravenhorst, 1806)^{g b}
- Philonthus pallipes Blanchard, 1842^{g}
- Philonthus palustris C.Brisout de Barneville, 1860^{g}
- Philonthus parvicornis (Gravenhorst, 1802)^{g}
- Philonthus peliomerus Kraatz, 1859^{g}
- Philonthus peregrinus Fauvel, 1866^{g}
- Philonthus perversus Horn, 1884^{g}
- Philonthus pettiti Horn, 1884^{g}
- Philonthus picipennis Heer, 1839^{g}
- Philonthus picnocara Gistel, 1857^{g}
- Philonthus politus (Linnaeus, 1758)^{g b}
- Philonthus pollens Marquez & Asiain, 2010^{g}
- Philonthus productus Kraatz, 1859^{g}
- Philonthus prolatus Sharp, 1874^{i c g}
- Philonthus propinquus Sharp, 1876^{g}
- Philonthus pseudolodes Smetana, 1996^{g}
- Philonthus pseudolus Smetana, 1995^{g}
- Philonthus pseudovarians Strand, 1941^{g}
- Philonthus puberulus Horn, 1884^{g}
- Philonthus pubes Horn, 1884^{g}
- Philonthus punctatellus Heer, 1839^{g}
- Philonthus puncticollis Stephens, 1832^{g}
- Philonthus punctus (Gravenhorst, 1802)^{g}
- Philonthus putridarius Gistel, 1857^{g}
- Philonthus pyrenaeus Kiesenwetter, 1850^{g}
- Philonthus quadraticeps Boheman, 1858^{g}
- Philonthus quadricollis Horn, 1884^{g b}
- Philonthus quadrulus Horn, 1884^{g}
- Philonthus quisquiliarius (Gyllenhal, 1810)^{g}
- Philonthus rectangulus Sharp, 1874^{g b}
- Philonthus retangulus Sharp, 1874^{i c g}
- Philonthus rivularis Kiesenwetter, 1858^{g}
- Philonthus rotundicollis (Ménétriés, 1832)^{g}
- Philonthus rubripennis Stephens, 1832^{g}
- Philonthus rufimanus Erichson, 1840^{g}
- Philonthus rufipes (Stephens, 1832)^{g}
- Philonthus rufulus Horn, 1884^{g b}
- Philonthus salinus Kiesenwetter, 1844^{g}
- Philonthus sanguinolentus (Gravenhorst, 1802)^{g}
- Philonthus scansor Gistel, 1857^{g}
- Philonthus schwarzi Horn, 1884^{g}
- Philonthus scybalarius Nordmann, 1837^{i c g}
- Philonthus semiruber Horn, 1884^{g}
- Philonthus sericans (Gravenhorst, 1802)^{g b}
- Philonthus sericeus Stephens, 1832^{g}
- Philonthus sericinus Horn, 1884^{g b}
- Philonthus sessor Smetana, 1965^{g}
- Philonthus siculus Gridelli, 1923^{g}
- Philonthus simpliciventris Bernhauer, 1933^{g}
- Philonthus smetanai Schillhammer, 2003^{g}
- Philonthus sospitalis Gistel, 1857^{g}
- Philonthus speculum Lokay, 1919^{g}
- Philonthus sphagnorum Smetana, 1995^{g}
- Philonthus spiniformis Hatch, 1957^{g}
- Philonthus spinipes Sharp, 1874^{g}
- Philonthus stictus Hausen, 1891^{g}
- Philonthus stragulatus Erichson, 1840^{g}
- Philonthus suavis Brisout de Barneville, 1867^{g}
- Philonthus suavus Brisout de Barneville, 1867^{g}
- Philonthus subnivalis Gistel, 1857^{g}
- Philonthus subvirescens C.G.Thomson, 1884^{g}
- Philonthus succicola Thomson, 1860^{g}
- Philonthus tahitiensis Coiffait, 1977^{g}
- Philonthus taiwanensis Shibata, 1993^{g}
- Philonthus tardus Kraatz^{g}
- Philonthus temporalis Mulsant & Rey, 1853^{g}
- Philonthus tenuicornis Mulsant & Rey, 1853^{g}
- Philonthus tillius Smetana, 1995^{g}
- Philonthus triangulum Horn, 1884^{g b}
- Philonthus tumulinus Tottenham, 1955^{g}
- Philonthus turbatus Erichson, 1840^{g}
- Philonthus turbidus Erichson, 1839^{i c g}
- Philonthus turbo Smetana, 1995^{g}
- Philonthus umbratilis (Gravenhorst, 1802)^{g}
- Philonthus umbrinoides Smetana, 1995^{g}
- Philonthus umbrinus (Gravenhorst, 1802)^{g}
- Philonthus validus Casey, 1915^{g}
- Philonthus varians (Paykull, 1789)^{g}
- Philonthus varro Smetana, 1995^{g}
- Philonthus ventralis Grav.^{i c g}
- Philonthus vesubiensis Coiffait, 1967^{g}
- Philonthus viduus Erichson, 1840^{g}
- Philonthus virgo (Gravenhorst, 1802)^{g}
- Philonthus viridipennis Fauvel, 1875^{g}
- Philonthus vulgatus Casey, 1915^{g b}
- Philonthus wollastoni Scheerpeltz, 1933^{g}
- Philonthus zhuk Gusarov, 1995^{g}

Data sources: i = ITIS, c = Catalogue of Life, g = GBIF, b = Bugguide.net
