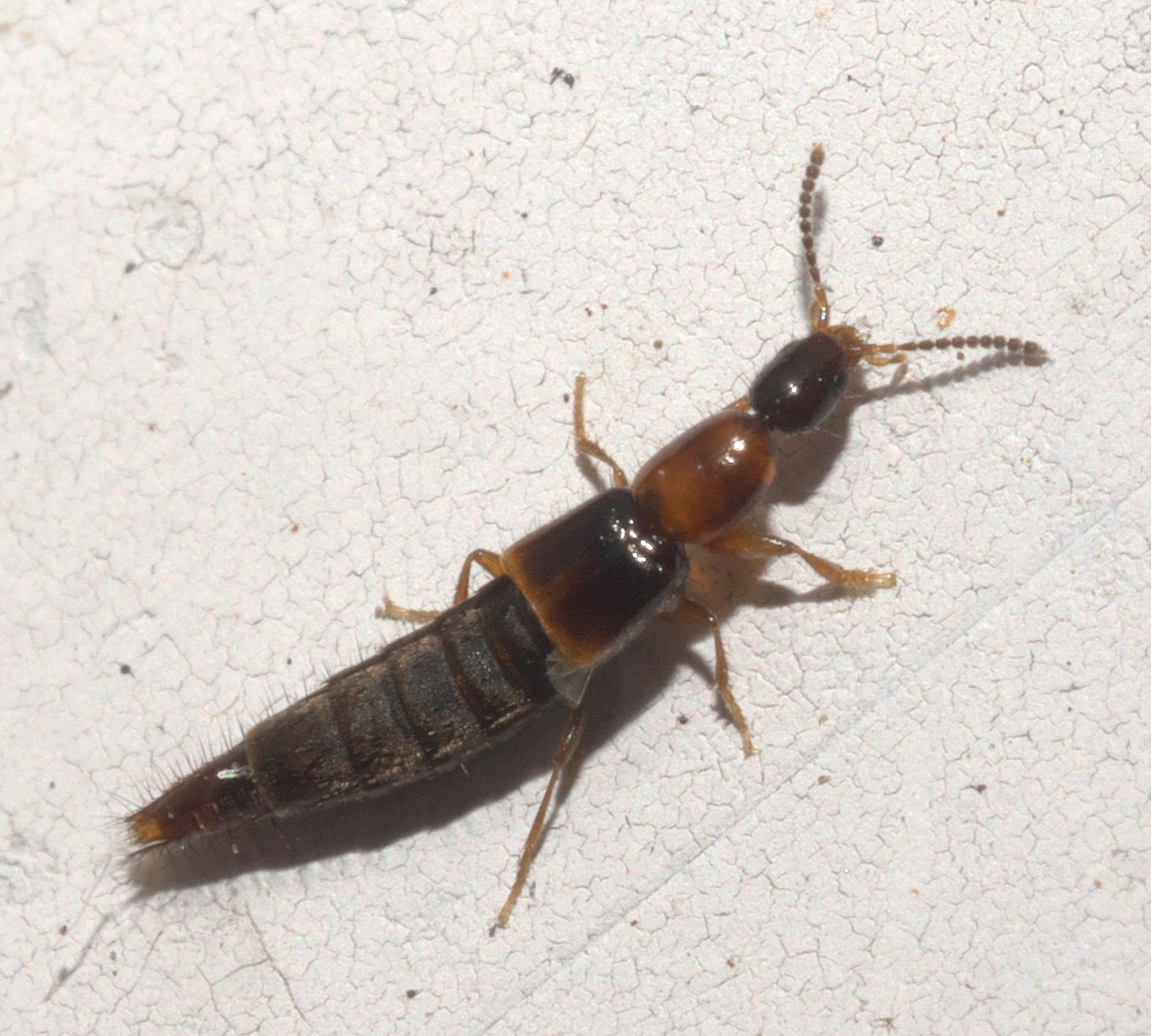
- D. schaumi from North America

Scientific classification
- Kingdom: Animalia
- Phylum: Arthropoda
- Class: Insecta
- Order: Coleoptera
- Suborder: Polyphaga
- Infraorder: Staphyliniformia
- Family: Staphylinidae
- Genus: Diochus
- Species: D. schaumii

Binomial name
- Diochus schaumii (Kraatz, 1860)

= Diochus schaumii =

Species of beetle

Diochus schaumii is a species of beetle of the Staphylinidae family, Staphylininae subfamily.
