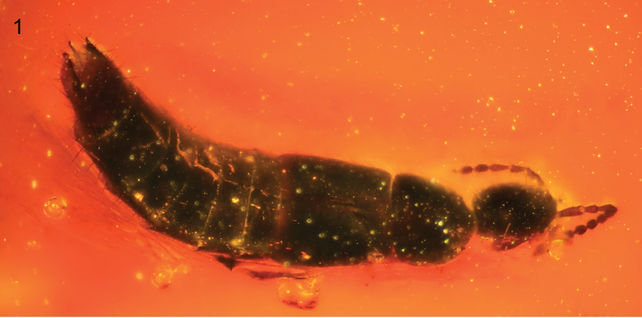
- Diochus electrus

Scientific classification
- Domain: Eukaryota
- Kingdom: Animalia
- Phylum: Arthropoda
- Class: Insecta
- Order: Coleoptera
- Suborder: Polyphaga
- Infraorder: Staphyliniformia
- Family: Staphylinidae
- Genus: Diochus
- Species: †D. electrus

Binomial name
- †Diochus electrus Chatzimanolis & Engel, 2011

= Diochus electrus =

Diochus electrus Temporal range: Lutetian

Species of beetle

Diochus electrus is an extinct species of rove beetle in genus Diochus, the only definitive fossil species in subfamily Staphylininae. The species is known only from the middle Eocene, Lutetian stage Baltic amber found in the Blaue Erde deposits, Baltic region, Northern Europe.

== History and classification ==
Diochus electrus is known only from one fossil, the holotype, number "KU-NHM-ENT, B-244". It is a single complete adult female preserved as an inclusion in a specimen of clear orange amber. The fossil was recovered from an outcrop of the Blaue Erde deposits which contain the fossil resins in the Baltic region. The type specimen is currently preserved in the Division of Entomology at the University of Kansas Natural History Museum located in Lawrence, Kansas, USA. Diochus electrus was first studied by Stylianos Chatzimanolis of the University of Tennessee at Chattanooga and Michael S. Engel of the University of Kansas. Their 2011 type description for the new species was published online and in print in the journal ZooKeys. The etymology of the specific name electrus is a derivation of the Latin word "electrum" meaning amber.

When Diochus electrus was described, it was the first definitive species of the rove beetle subfamily Staphylininae to be described from the fossil record. The Baltic amber species Bembicidiodes inaequicollis, described by L. W. Schaufuss in 1888, was formerly considered part of Staphylininae. However reevaluation of the species in 2001 by L.H. Herman raised doubts about the correct subfamily placement for B. inaequicollis. Diochus electrus is one of eleven species of the genus Diochus inhabiting the Palearctic realm.

== Description ==
The Diochus electrus type specimen is a well preserved fully complete female with a total body length of 3.5 millimetres (0.14 in). The 0.56 by 0.48 millimetres (0.022 by 0.019 in) head is ovoid in shape and has fine sculpturing with sporadic punctations. The antenna do not have a geniculate structure, which indicates placement of the species into the tribe Diochini. Though similar to the genus Coomania, the neck of D. electrus is more robust, with Coomania having a neck that is approximately a fifth the width of the head. The elytra of D. electrus are 0.75 millimetres (0.030 in) in length and have a width of 0.67 millimetres (0.026 in). They are longer than the 0.64 millimetres (0.025 in) pronotum. The other ten palearctic species of Diochus possess pronotum which are longer than the elytra, distinguishing D. electrus as a species.
