= Diochus bicolor =

Scientific classification
- Kingdom: Animalia
- Phylum: Arthropoda
- Class: Insecta
- Order: Coleoptera
- Suborder: Polyphaga
- Infraorder: Staphyliniformia
- Family: Staphylinidae
- Genus: Diochus
- Species: D. bicolor

Binomial name
- Diochus bicolor (Scheerpeltz, 1974)

Species of beetle

Diochus bicolor is a species of beetle of the Staphylinidae family, Staphylininae subfamily. It's found in South Africa.
