= Diochus apicipennis =

Scientific classification
- Kingdom: Animalia
- Phylum: Arthropoda
- Class: Insecta
- Order: Coleoptera
- Suborder: Polyphaga
- Infraorder: Staphyliniformia
- Family: Staphylinidae
- Genus: Diochus
- Species: D. apicipennis

Binomial name
- Diochus apicipennis (Cameron, 1922)

Species of beetle

Diochus apicipennis is a species of beetle of the Staphylinidae family, Staphylininae subfamily.
