= Diochus staudingeri =

Scientific classification
- Kingdom: Animalia
- Phylum: Arthropoda
- Clade: Pancrustacea
- Class: Insecta
- Order: Coleoptera
- Suborder: Polyphaga
- Infraorder: Staphyliniformia
- Family: Staphylinidae
- Genus: Diochus
- Species: D. staudingeri

Binomial name
- Diochus staudingeri (Kraatz, 1860)

Species of western Mediterranean beetle

Diochus staudingeri is a species of beetle of the Staphylinidae family, Staphylininae subfamily. It is the only member of Diochus found in Europe, being found in southern Iberia and along the North African coast.

Diochus occultus is a proposed sister species to D. staudingeri, with both found coexisting in pine forests of the Province of Cádiz. Unlike the rest of Diochus which are epigeal, D. occultus is endogean, being found beneath layers of leaf litter and soil. D. occultus exhibits a shorter head and reduced eyes when compared with D. staudingeri.
