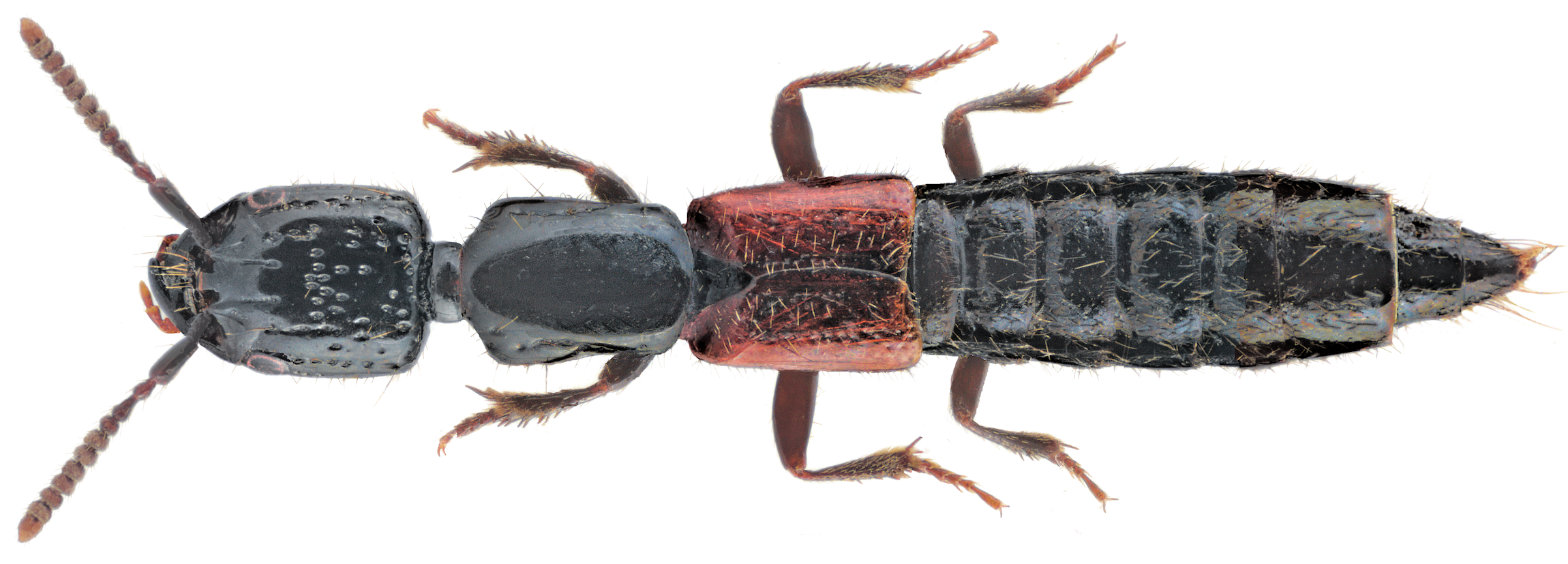
- Gauropterus fulgidus

Scientific classification
- Kingdom: Animalia
- Phylum: Arthropoda
- Class: Insecta
- Order: Coleoptera
- Suborder: Polyphaga
- Infraorder: Staphyliniformia
- Family: Staphylinidae
- Subfamily: Staphylininae
- Tribe: Xantholinini
- Genus: Gauropterus; Thomson, 1860

= Gauropterus =

Genus of beetles

Gauropterus is a genus of beetles belonging to the family Staphylinidae.

== Species ==
There are 32 recognized species:

- Gauropterus abactus Tottenham, 1939
- Gauropterus abessinus Bordoni, 2016
- Gauropterus africanus Bordoni, 2016
- Gauropterus albocinctus (Fauvel, 1905)
- Gauropterus annamensis Bordoni, 2002
- Gauropterus bnomensis Bordoni, 2002
- Gauropterus bucharicus Bernhauer, 1905
- Gauropterus ceylonensis Bordoni, 2002
- Gauropterus claviger (Fauvel, 1905)
- Gauropterus diabolicus (Bernhauer, 1902)
- Gauropterus evansi Bernhauer, 1937
- Gauropterus fauveli Steel, 1949
- Gauropterus fulgidus (Fabricius, 1787)
- Gauropterus gagatinus (Erichson, 1839)
- Gauropterus gedyei Cameron, 1951
- Gauropterus geigenmuelleri Bordoni, 2002
- Gauropterus hauseri Bernhauer, 1937
- Gauropterus hova (Fauvel, 1905)
- Gauropterus morio (Motschulsky, 1858)
- Gauropterus nasutus (Harold, 1879)
- Gauropterus notabilis Kirshenblat, 1951
- Gauropterus pustulatus Bernhauer, 1937
- Gauropterus romeralensis Coiffait & Sáiz, 1964
- Gauropterus sanguinipennis (Kolenati, 1846)
- Gauropterus sanguinipes (Reitter, 1889)
- Gauropterus semenovi Kirshenblat, 1951
- Gauropterus sjostedti Bernhauer, 1927
- Gauropterus subcylindricus Jarrige, 1948
- Gauropterus trichinopolyae Bordoni, 2002
- Gauropterus umbilicatus (Fauvel, 1905)
- Gauropterus zambianus Bordoni, 2016
- Gauropterus zimbabwae Bordoni, 2016
