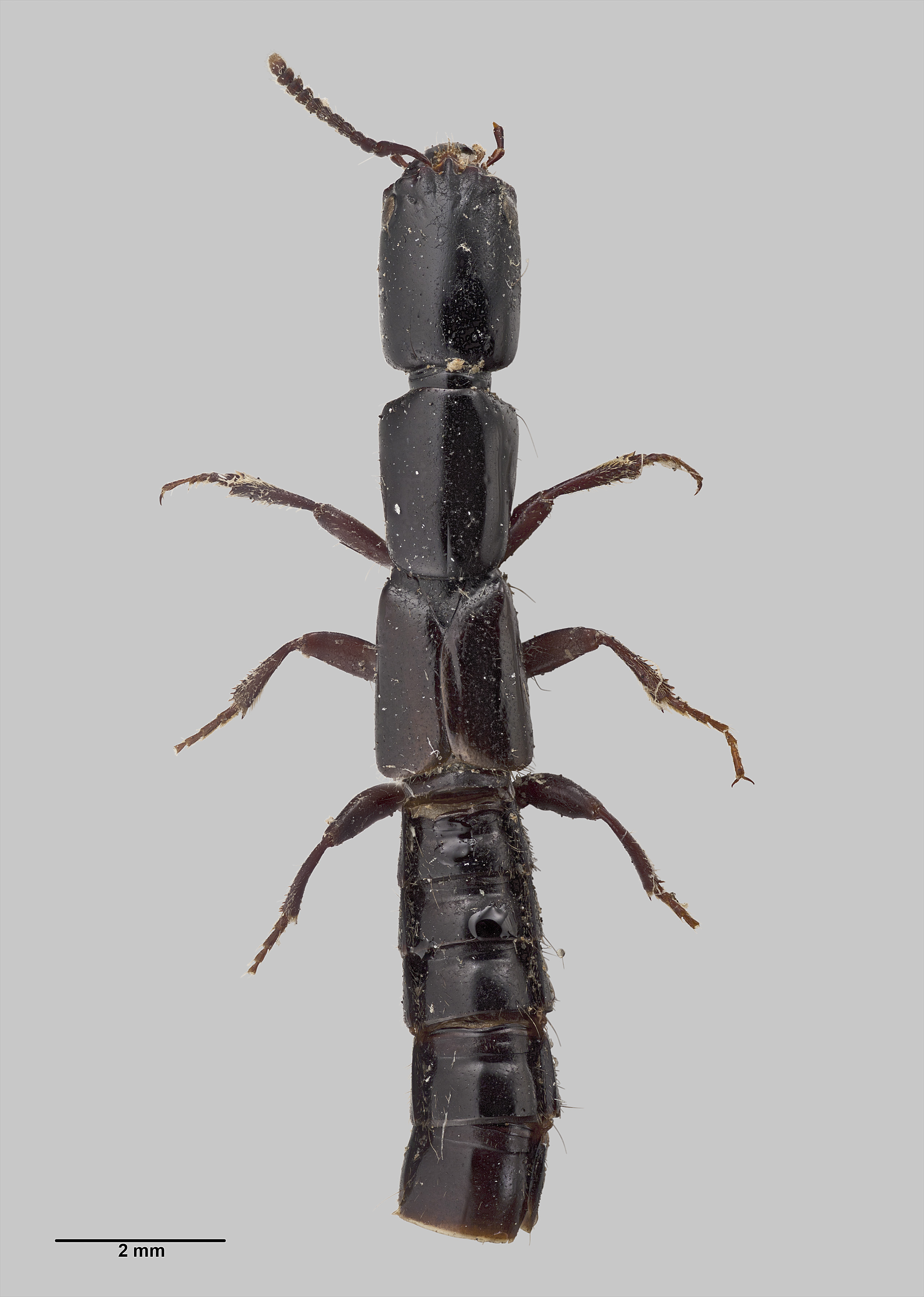
- Waitatia bellicosa

Scientific classification
- Kingdom: Animalia
- Phylum: Arthropoda
- Clade: Pancrustacea
- Class: Insecta
- Order: Coleoptera
- Suborder: Polyphaga
- Infraorder: Staphyliniformia
- Family: Staphylinidae
- Subfamily: Staphylininae
- Tribe: Xantholinini; Erichson, 1839

Genera
- 141 genera (see text)

= Xantholinini =

Tribe of beetles

Xantholinini is a tribe of rove beetle.

== Description ==
Xantholinini are small- to medium-sized short-winged beetles (from 2 mm to 2 cm) that are long and slender, short-legged, and shiny. The head is relatively long and narrow. Xantholinini live on the ground, in bedding, under rocks. The narrow body shape and short legs make them suitable for moving through narrow aisles. They are predatory beetles that eat other small arthropods. The tribe Xantholinini is represented in all zoogeographical regions.

== Genera ==
There are about 141 genera:

- Achemia Bordoni, 2003
- Achmonia Bordoni, 2004
- Adamanthea Bordoni, 2013
- Adhavara Bordoni, 2002
- Afrus Janák & Bordoni, 2015
- Agaporina Bordoni, 2016
- Agerodes Motschulsky, 1858
- Agoreina Bordoni, 2016
- Agrodes Nordmann, 1837
- Ahrimania Bordoni, 2013
- Aleutia Bordoni, 2016
- Alexyrea Bordoni, 2016
- Allolinus Coiffait, 1966
- Allotrichus Sharp, 1885
- Amharina Bordoni, 2016
- Andamania Bordoni, 2002
- Andelis Bordoni, 2002
- Archaites Bordoni, 2005
- Atopolinus Coiffait, 1982
- Australinus Bordoni, 2005
- Balchis Bordoni, 2016
- Bathyllia Bordoni, 2010
- Belinga Bordoni, 2016
- Bruxneria Bordoni, 2012
- Byziniella Bordoni, 2016
- Capesia Bordoni, 2016
- Chaetocinus Coiffait, 1968
- Crinolinus Smetana, 1982
- Cylindrinus Bordoni, 2002
- Dactylaptatus Lecoq, 1990
- Denon Bordoni, 2002
- Dibothroglyptus Scheerpeltz, 1957
- Domea Bordoni, 2002
- Eachamia Bordoni, 2005
- Edulia Bordoni, 2007
- Elapheia Bordoni, 2016
- Elitheya Bordoni, 2016
- Emathidis Bordoni, 2007
- Endymathis Bordoni, 2016
- Enervia Bordoni, 2005
- Erymus Bordoni, 2002
- Eulissus Mannerheim, 1830
- Faxilla Bordoni, 2002
- Gauropterus Thomson, 1860
- Grevillia Bordoni, 2005
- Guineella Bordoni, 2014
- Guineodinella Bordoni, 2009
- Gyrohypnus Leach in Samouelle, 1819
- Habrolinus Casey, 1906
- Hesperolinus Casey, 1906
- Heterocinus Jarrige, 1970
- Heterolinus Sharp, 1885
- Himmala Bordoni, 2002
- Holocorynus Sharp, 1908
- Homalolinus Sharp, 1885
- Homorocerus Boheman, 1848
- Hypnogyra Casey, 1906
- Indolinus Bordoni, 2002
- Indomorphus Bordoni, 2002
- Kamilaroius Bordoni, 2017
- Lemiganus Bordoni, 1985
- Lepidophallus Coiffait, 1956
- Lepitacnus Smetana, 1982
- Leptacinellus Bordoni, 2002
- Leptacinus Erichson, 1839
- Leptomicrus Fauvel, 1878
- Leptophius Coiffait, 1983
- Leurocorynus Sharp, 1908
- Linohesperus Smetana, 1982
- Linosomus Kraatz, 1857
- Liotesba Scheerpeltz, 1965
- Lissohypnus Casey, 1906
- Lithocharodes Sharp, 1876
- Maharadja Bordoni, 2002
- Mahavana Bordoni, 2002
- Manilla Bordoni, 1990
- Medhiama Bordoni, 2002
- Megalinus Mulsant & Rey, 1877
- Metocinus Cameron, 1950
- Metolinus Cameron, 1920
- Metosina Bordoni, 2002
- Microafra Bordoni, 2016
- Microleptus Jarrige, 1963
- Microlinus Casey, 1906
- Mitomorphus Kraatz, 1859
- Neohypnus Coiffait & Saiz, 1964
- Neoleptacinus Coiffait & Sáiz, 1964
- Neoxantholinus Cameron, 1945
- Nepalinus Coiffait, 1975
- Nilla Bordoni, 2002
- Notolinopsis Casey, 1906
- Notolinus Casey, 1906
- Nudobius Thomson, 1860
- Oculolabrus Steel, 1946
- Otagonia Bordoni, 2005
- Oxybleptes Smetana, 1982
- Pachycorynus Motschoulsky, 1858
- Pahanghella Bordoni, 2002
- Paracorynus Cameron, 1945
- Paratesba Cameron, 1932
- Phacophallus Coiffait, 1956
- Platydromus Fauvel, 1905
- Plochionocerus Dejean, 1833
- Pseudocorynus Cameron, 1945
- Pseudoxantholinus
- Queenslandina Bordoni, 2005
- Renda Blackwelder, 1952
- Sagarmatha Bordoni, 2002
- Scytalinus Erichson, 1839
- Sengenia Bordoni, 2016
- Sinichella Bordoni, 2013
- Someira Bordoni, 2002
- Somoleptus Sharp, 1885
- Spaniolinus Bernhauer, 1916
- Stenistoderus Jacquelin du Val, 1856
- Stenolinus Bierig, 1937
- Stictolinus Casey, 1906
- Sulawesina Bordoni, 2002
- Sumatera Bordoni, 2002
- Sungaria Bordoni, 2003
- Sylea Bordoni, 2001
- Symilla Bordoni, 2002
- Talliella Bordoni, 2002
- Tamilla Bordoni, 2002
- Tesba Sharp, 1876
- Tetraulacus Bordoni, 2002
- Thyreocephalus Guérin-Ménéville, 1844
- Tralichia Bordoni, 2002
- Ulisseus Bordoni, 2002
- Vulda Jacquelin du Val, 1852
- Waitatia Bordoni, 2005
- Walesia Bordoni, 2005
- Whangareiella Bordoni, 2005
- Xanthocorynus Sharp, 1908
- Xantholinus Dejean, 1821
- Xanthophius Motschulsky, 1860
- Xestolinus Casey, 1906
- Yunna Bordoni, 2002
- Yunnella Bordoni, 2002
- Zenon Smetana, 1982
- Zeteotomus Jacquelin du Val, 1856
