= Diochus astutus =

Scientific classification
- Kingdom: Animalia
- Phylum: Arthropoda
- Class: Insecta
- Order: Coleoptera
- Suborder: Polyphaga
- Infraorder: Staphyliniformia
- Family: Staphylinidae
- Genus: Diochus
- Species: D. astutus

Binomial name
- Diochus astutus (Casey, 1906)

Species of beetle

Diochus astutus is a species of beetle of the Staphylinidae family, Staphylininae subfamily. It's found in South Africa.
