= Diochus adisi =

Scientific classification
- Kingdom: Animalia
- Phylum: Arthropoda
- Class: Insecta
- Order: Coleoptera
- Suborder: Polyphaga
- Infraorder: Staphyliniformia
- Family: Staphylinidae
- Genus: Diochus
- Species: D. adisi

Binomial name
- Diochus adisi (Irmler, 2017)

Species of beetle

Diochus adisii is a species of beetle of the Staphylinidae family, Staphylininae subfamily. It's found in Brazil.
