= Antarctothius =

Scientific classification
- Kingdom: Animalia
- Phylum: Arthropoda
- Class: Insecta
- Order: Coleoptera
- Suborder: Polyphaga
- Infraorder: Staphyliniformia
- Family: Staphylinidae
- Subfamily: Staphylininae
- Tribe: Diochini
- Genus: Antarctothius (Coiffait & Sáiz, 1969)

Genus of beetles

Antarctothius is a genus of rove beetles in the family Staphylinidae, subfamily Staphylininae.

== Species ==
There are 2 species described in Antarctothius:

- Antarctothius antarcticus Chile, Argentina (Fairmaire, 1885)
- Antarctothius fuegius Chile (Coiffait & Sáiz, 1969)
