= Philonthus hepaticus =

Scientific classification
- Kingdom: Animalia
- Phylum: Arthropoda
- Class: Insecta
- Order: Coleoptera
- Suborder: Polyphaga
- Infraorder: Staphyliniformia
- Family: Staphylinidae
- Genus: Philonthus
- Species: P. hepaticus

Binomial name
- Philonthus hepaticus Er.

Species of beetle

Philonthus hepaticus is a species of large rove beetle in the family Staphylinidae. It is found in North America.
