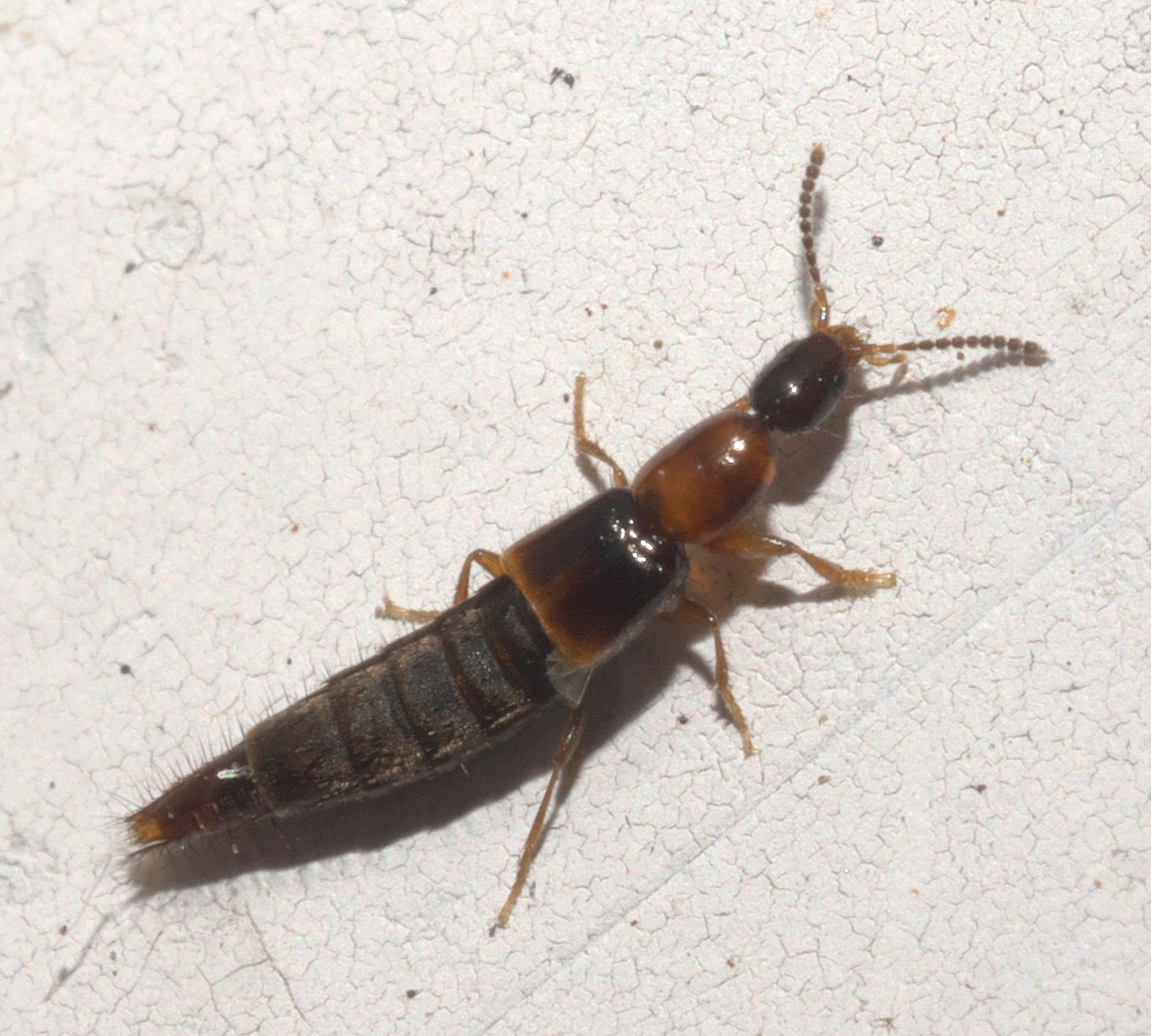
- D. schaumi from North America

Scientific classification
- Kingdom: Animalia
- Phylum: Arthropoda
- Clade: Pancrustacea
- Class: Insecta
- Order: Coleoptera
- Suborder: Polyphaga
- Infraorder: Staphyliniformia
- Family: Staphylinidae
- Subfamily: Staphylininae
- Tribe: Diochini
- Genus: Diochus; Erichson, 1839

= Diochus =

Genus of beetles

Diochus is a genus of beetles belonging to the family Staphylinidae.

The genus has cosmopolitan distribution.

== Species ==
The genus contains the following species:

- Diochus acehensis Huang, Tian, Janák & Hong-Zhang Zhou, 2025
- Diochus adisi Irmler, 2017
- Diochus amazonensis Irmler, 2017
- Diochus ampullaceus Zhou, Yu-Lingzi & Hong-Zhang Zhou, 2016
- Diochus angustiformis Irmler, 2017
- Diochus antennalis Cameron, 1922
- Diochus antennatus (Motschulsky, 1858)
- Diochus apicipennis Cameron, 1922
- Diochus argentinae Irmler, 2017
- Diochus ashei Irmler, 2017
- Diochus astutus Casey, 1906
- Diochus balangensis Huang, Tian, Janák & Hong-Zhang Zhou, 2025
- Diochus basseti Huang, Tian, Yu-Lingzi Zhou, J. Janák & Hong-Zhang Zhou, 2024
- Diochus bicolor Scheerpeltz, 1974
- Diochus bicoloripennis Coiffait, 1981
- Diochus bilobatus Huang, Tian, Janák & Hong-Zhang Zhou, 2025
- Diochus bisegmentatus Zhou, Yu-Lingzi & Hong-Zhang Zhou, 2016
- Diochus bogorensis Huang, Tian, Janák & Hong-Zhang Zhou, 2025
- Diochus borneensis Cameron, 1933
- Diochus brooksi Irmler, 2017
- Diochus brunneus Irmler, 2017
- Diochus brunniventris Cameron, 1938
- Diochus cameroni Huang, Tian, Janák & Hong-Zhang Zhou, 2024
- Diochus caudapiscis Shuai, Qi, Nozaki & Liang Tang, 2021
- Diochus ceylonicus Huang, Tian, Janák & Hong-Zhang Zhou, 2024
- Diochus chambrieri Huang, Tian, J. Janák & Hong-Zhang Zhou., 2024
- Diochus cleidecostae Caron & Navarro, 2020
- Diochus communis Coiffait, 1968
- Diochus conicollis (Motschulsky, 1858)
- Diochus crispus Huang, Tian, Janák & Hong-Zhang Zhou, 2025
- Diochus cristobalensis Coiffait, 1981
- Diochus curtipennis Irmler, 2017
- Diochus debilis Coiffait, 1968
- Diochus divisus Fauvel, 1877
- Diochus dundoensis Cameron, 1959
- Diochus ecuadoriensis Irmler, 2017
- Diochus elongatus Huang, Tian, J. Janák & Hong-Zhang Zhou., 2024
- Diochus emarginatus Huang, Tian, Janák & Hong-Zhang Zhou, 2024
- Diochus flandrianus Bernhauer, 1932
- Diochus formicetorum Bernhauer, 1927
- Diochus franzi Coiffait, 1981
- Diochus gabonicus Coiffait, 1968
- Diochus guianensis Irmler, 2017
- Diochus guizhouensis Shuai, Qi, Nozaki & Liang Tang, 2021
- Diochus hanagarthi Irmler, 2017
- Diochus hatayus Assing, 2003
- Diochus hermani Irmler, 2017
- Diochus hibbsi Irmler, 2017
- Diochus inornatus Sharp, 1885
- Diochus insularis Huang, Tian, Janák, Hong-Zhang Zhou & Si-Qin Ge, 2026
- Diochus isabelae Coiffait, 1981
- Diochus japonicus Cameron, 1930
- Diochus keralanus Huang, Tian, Janák & Hong-Zhang Zhou, 2024
- Diochus lawrencei Huang, Tian, Yu-Lingzi Zhou, J. Janák & Hong-Zhang Zhou, 2024
- Diochus libanoticus Fagel, 1966
- Diochus loebli Huang, Tian, J. Janák & Hong-Zhang Zhou., 2024
- Diochus lombokensis Huang, Tian, Janák & Hong-Zhang Zhou, 2025
- Diochus longicornis Sharp, 1876
- Diochus longus Lea, 1929
- Diochus machadoi Cameron, 1959
- Diochus maculicollis Fauvel, 1891
- Diochus madangensis Huang, Tian, Janák, Hong-Zhang Zhou & Si-Qin Ge, 2026
- Diochus membranaceus Zhou, Yu-Lingzi & Hong-Zhang Zhou, 2016
- Diochus mexicanus Irmler, 2017
- Diochus moluccanus Huang, Tian, Janák, Hong-Zhang Zhou & Si-Qin Ge, 2026
- Diochus montguilloni Coiffait, 1987
- Diochus myanmarensis Huang, Tian, Janák & Hong-Zhang Zhou, 2025
- Diochus nanus Erichson, 1839
- Diochus newtoni Irmler, 2017
- Diochus novus Irmler, 2017
- Diochus occultus Hernando & Andujar, 2020
- Diochus ochraceus Cameron, 1926
- Diochus octavii Fauvel, 1877
- Diochus panamaensis Irmler, 2017
- Diochus papuanus Cameron, 1938
- Diochus paradoxus Huang, Tian, Janák & Hong-Zhang Zhou, 2025
- Diochus paraparadoxus Huang, Tian, Janák & Hong-Zhang Zhou, 2025
- Diochus parellipticus Huang, Tian, Janák & Hong-Zhang Zhou, 2025
- Diochus parvoculatus Huang, Tian, Janák, Hong-Zhang Zhou & Si-Qin Ge, 2026
- Diochus parvulus Kraatz, 1860
- Diochus perplexus Cameron, 1922
- Diochus peruvianus Irmler, 2017
- Diochus petilus Herman, 2001
- Diochus plaumanni Irmler, 2017
- Diochus proximus Cameron, 1952
- Diochus pubiventris Lea, 1929
- Diochus pulchellus Cameron, 1918
- Diochus pumilio Bernhauer, 1929
- Diochus punctipennis (Motschulsky, 1858)
- Diochus quadraticeps Huang, Tian, Janák, Hong-Zhang Zhou & Si-Qin Ge, 2026
- Diochus robustus Huang, Tian, Janák & Hong-Zhang Zhou, 2025
- Diochus santacatarinae Irmler, 2017
- Diochus santiagus Coiffait, 1981
- Diochus schaumii Kraatz, 1860
- Diochus schuelkei Irmler, 2017
- Diochus senegalensis Fauvel, 1900
- Diochus setatus Huang, Tian, Janák & Hong-Zhang Zhou, 2024
- Diochus setifer Huang, Tian, Janák & Hong-Zhang Zhou, 2024
- Diochus sinuatus Huang, Tian, Janák, Hong-Zhang Zhou & Si-Qin Ge, 2026
- Diochus slipinskii Huang, Tian, Yu-Lingzi Zhou, J. Janák & Hong-Zhang Zhou, 2024
- Diochus staudingeri Kraatz, 1860
- Diochus sulawesiensis Huang, Tian, Janák & Hong-Zhang Zhou, 2025
- Diochus sulcatus Assing, 2003
- Diochus tahitiensis Coiffait, 1976
- Diochus tarsalis Sharp, 1876
- Diochus testaceus Bernhauer, 1932
- Diochus tricolor Irmler, 2017
- Diochus ullrichi Huang, Tian, Janák, Hong-Zhang Zhou & Si-Qin Ge, 2026
- Diochus umphangensis Huang, Tian, Janák & Hong-Zhang Zhou, 2025
- Diochus unicolor Irmler, 2017
- Diochus uvellipticus Huang, Tian, Janák & Hong-Zhang Zhou, 2025
- Diochus ventralis Coiffait, 1968
- Diochus verhaaghi Irmler, 2017
- Diochus vicinus Sharp, 1876
- Diochus weiri Huang, Tian, Yu-Lingzi Zhou, J. Janák & Hong-Zhang Zhou, 2024
- †Diochus balticus Janák, 2025
- †Diochus electrus Chatzimanolis & Engel, 2011
