= Maorothius =

Scientific classification
- Kingdom: Animalia
- Phylum: Arthropoda
- Class: Insecta
- Order: Coleoptera
- Suborder: Polyphaga
- Infraorder: Staphyliniformia
- Family: Staphylinidae
- Subfamily: Staphylininae
- Tribe: Maorothiini
- Genus: Maorothius (Assing, 2000)

Genus of beetles

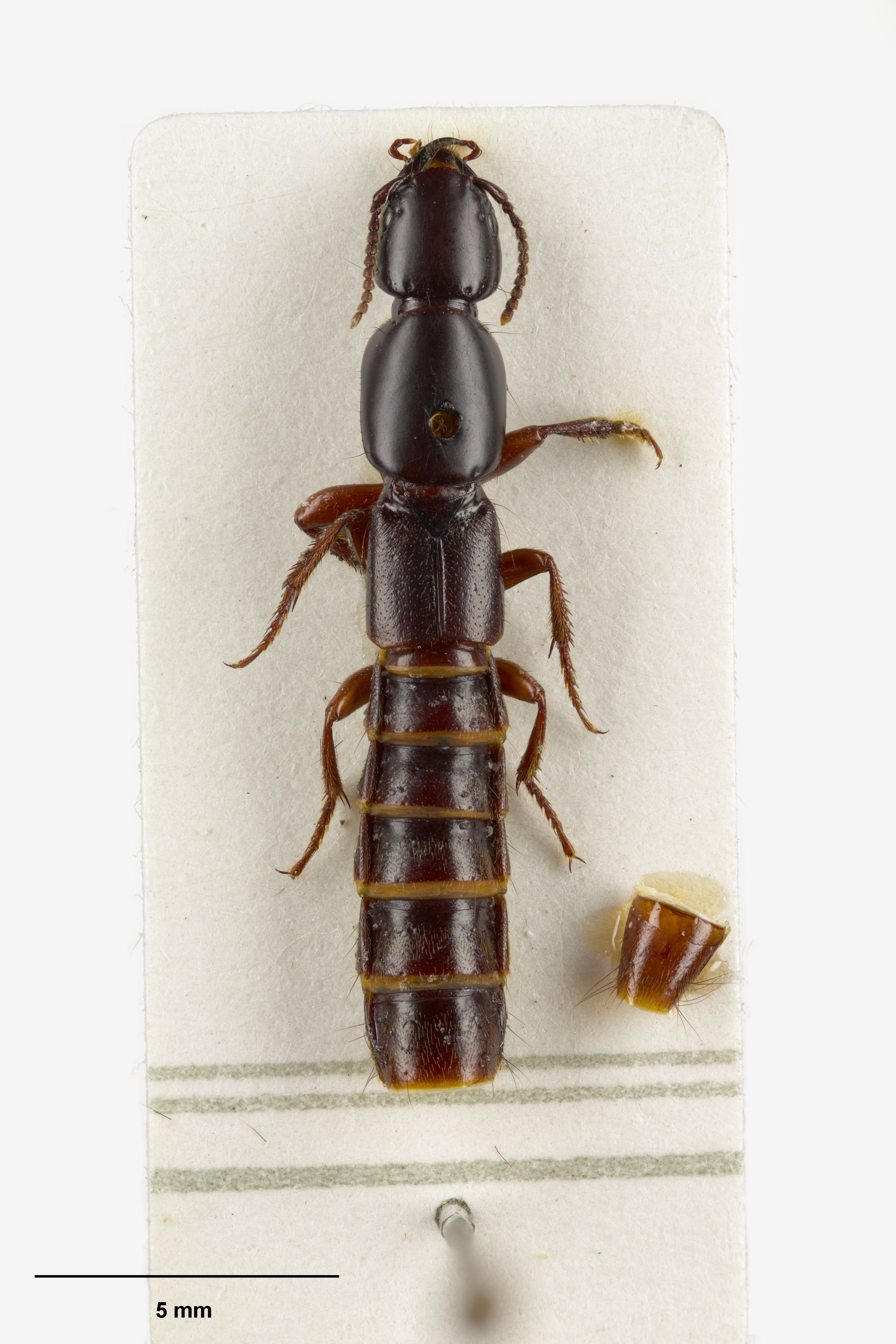
Holotype for Maorothius pubescens (Assing, 2000), collected 20 January 1962, Waitotara, Wanganui, New Zealand.

Maorothius is a genus of rove beetles in the family Staphylinidae, subfamily Staphylininae.

== Species ==
There are 20 species described in Maorothius. All species are found in New Zealand.

- Maorothius adustus (Broun, 1880)
- Maorothius brevispinosus (Assing, 2000)
- Maorothius brookesi (Cameron, 1952)
- Maorothius brouni (Steel, 1949)
- Maorothius coalitus(Assing, 2000)
- Maorothius dispar (Assing, 2000)
- Maorothius effeminatus (Assing, 2000)
- Maorothius hamifer (Assing, 2000)
- Maorothius hammondi (Assing, 2000)
- Maorothius insulanus (Assing, 2000)
- Maorothius longispinosus (Assing, 2000)
- Maorothius pectinatus (Assing, 2000)
- Maorothius pubescens (Assing, 2000)
- Maorothius puncticeps (Broun, 1894)
- Maorothius setiger (Assing, 2000)
- Maorothius solus (Assing, 2000)
- Maorothius tonsor (Assing, 2000)
- Maorothius torquatus (Assing, 2000)
- Maorothius tridens (Assing, 2000)
- Maorothius volans (Assing, 2000)
