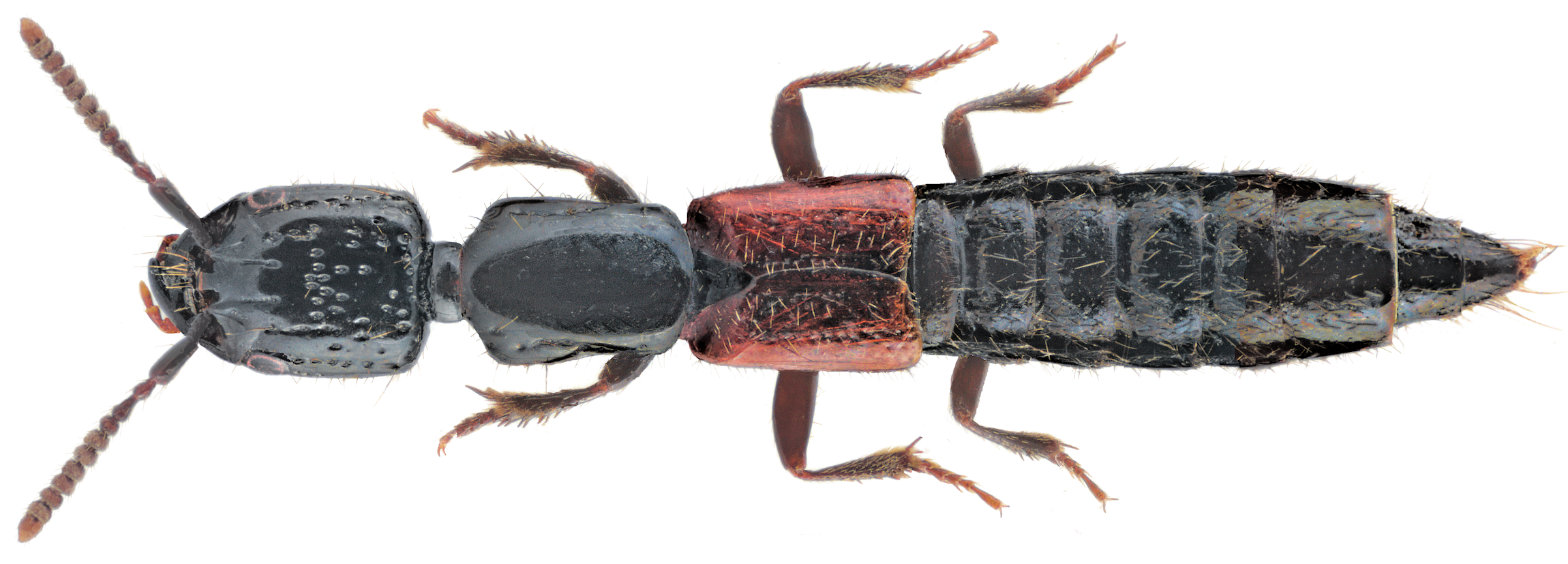
- Gauropterus fulgidus 10,3 mm (9,0 to 11,5mm)

Scientific classification
- Kingdom: Animalia
- Phylum: Arthropoda
- Class: Insecta
- Order: Coleoptera
- Suborder: Polyphaga
- Infraorder: Staphyliniformia
- Family: Staphylinidae
- Genus: Gauropterus
- Species: G. fulgidus

Binomial name
- Gauropterus fulgidus (Fabricius, 1787)

= Gauropterus fulgidus =

Species of beetle

Gauropterus fulgidus is a species of rove beetles native to Europe.
