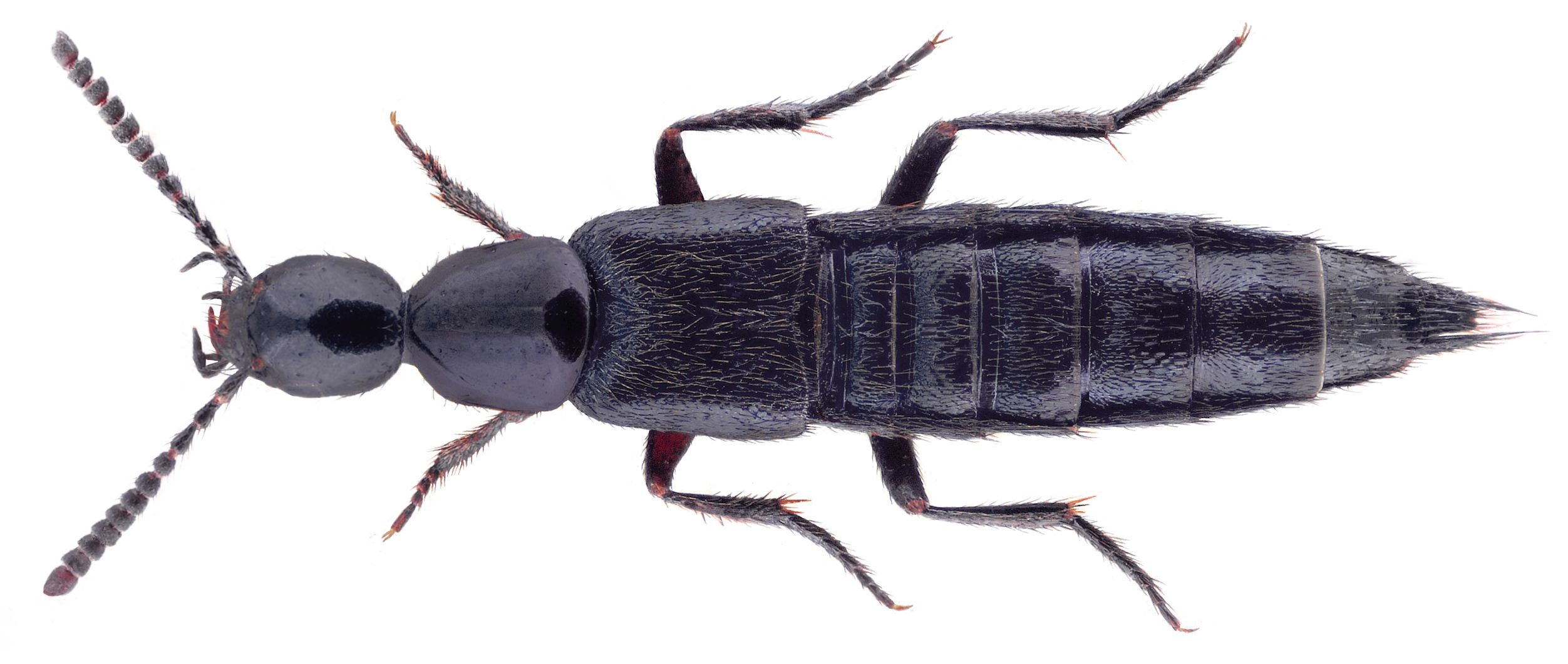
- Rabigus pullus

Scientific classification
- Kingdom: Animalia
- Phylum: Arthropoda
- Class: Insecta
- Order: Coleoptera
- Suborder: Polyphaga
- Infraorder: Staphyliniformia
- Family: Staphylinidae
- Genus: Rabigus; Mulsant & Rey, 1876

= Rabigus =

Genus of beetles

Rabigus is a genus of rove beetles belonging to the subfamily Staphylininae. The species of this genus are distributed in the Palaearctic, Oriental, and Nearctic realms.

== Species ==
There are 25 recognized species:

- Rabigus abauriae (Gridelli, 1924)
- Rabigus alienus (Eppelsheim, 1889)
- Rabigus basipilosus (Schubert, K., 1908)
- Rabigus cuspus Fei & Zhou, 2021
- Rabigus escurialensis (Pérez-Arcas, 1865)
- Rabigus fomitschevi Khachikov, 2005
- Rabigus formosus (Motschulsky, 1860)
- Rabigus hindostanus (Schubert, K., 1911)
- Rabigus inconstans (Sharp, 1889)
- Rabigus jumlensis Coiffait, 1982
- Rabigus karakorus Coiffait, 1981
- Rabigus ladakhensis Coiffait, 1982
- Rabigus laxellus (Casey, 1915)
- Rabigus ocaleoides (Sahlberg, J., 1908)
- Rabigus pamirensis (Sharp, 1878)
- Rabigus princeps (Bernhauer, 1902)
- Rabigus pulloides Coiffait, 1982
- Rabigus pullus (Nordmann, 1837)
- Rabigus purkynei (Smetana, 1963)
- Rabigus queinneci Coiffait, 1983
- Rabigus ruficapillus (Reitter, 1887)
- Rabigus sagittus Fei & Zhou, 2021
- Rabigus syriacus (Gridelli, 1924)
- Rabigus tenuis (Fabricius, 1792)
- Rabigus triquetrus Fei & Zhou, 2021
