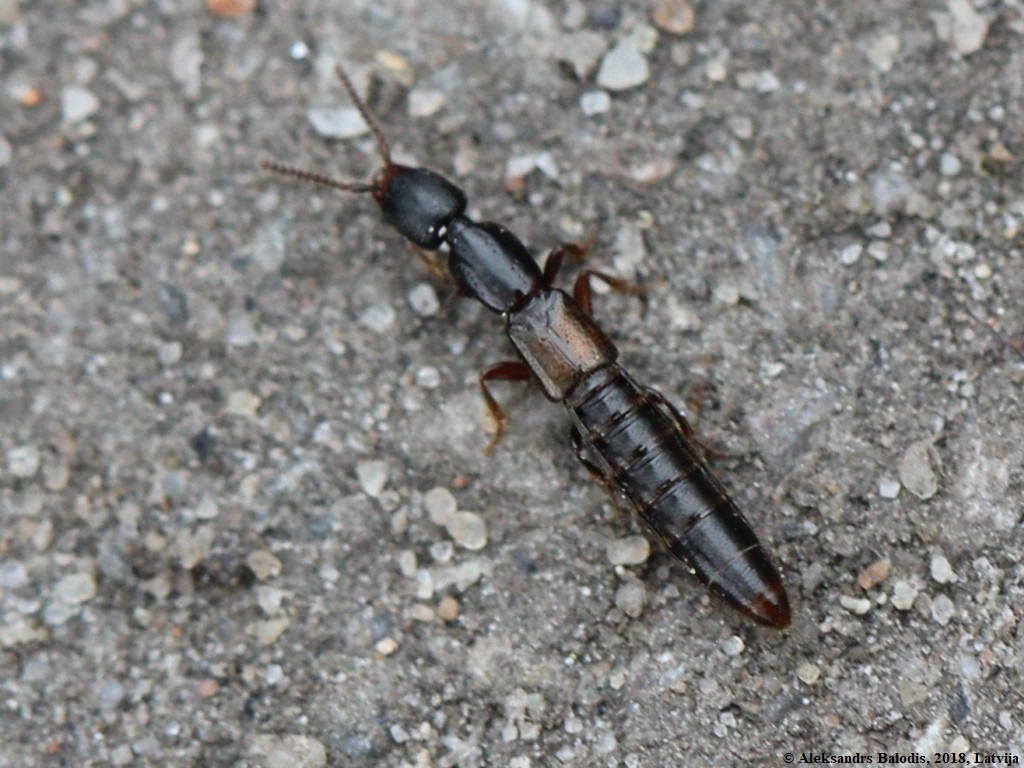

Scientific classification
- Kingdom: Animalia
- Phylum: Arthropoda
- Class: Insecta
- Order: Coleoptera
- Suborder: Polyphaga
- Infraorder: Staphyliniformia
- Family: Staphylinidae
- Genus: Leptacinus
- Species: L. batychrus

Binomial name
- Leptacinus batychrus (Gyllenhal, 1827)

= Leptacinus batychrus =

Species of beetle

Leptacinus batychrus is a species of beetle belonging to the family Staphylinidae.

It has cosmopolitan distribution.
