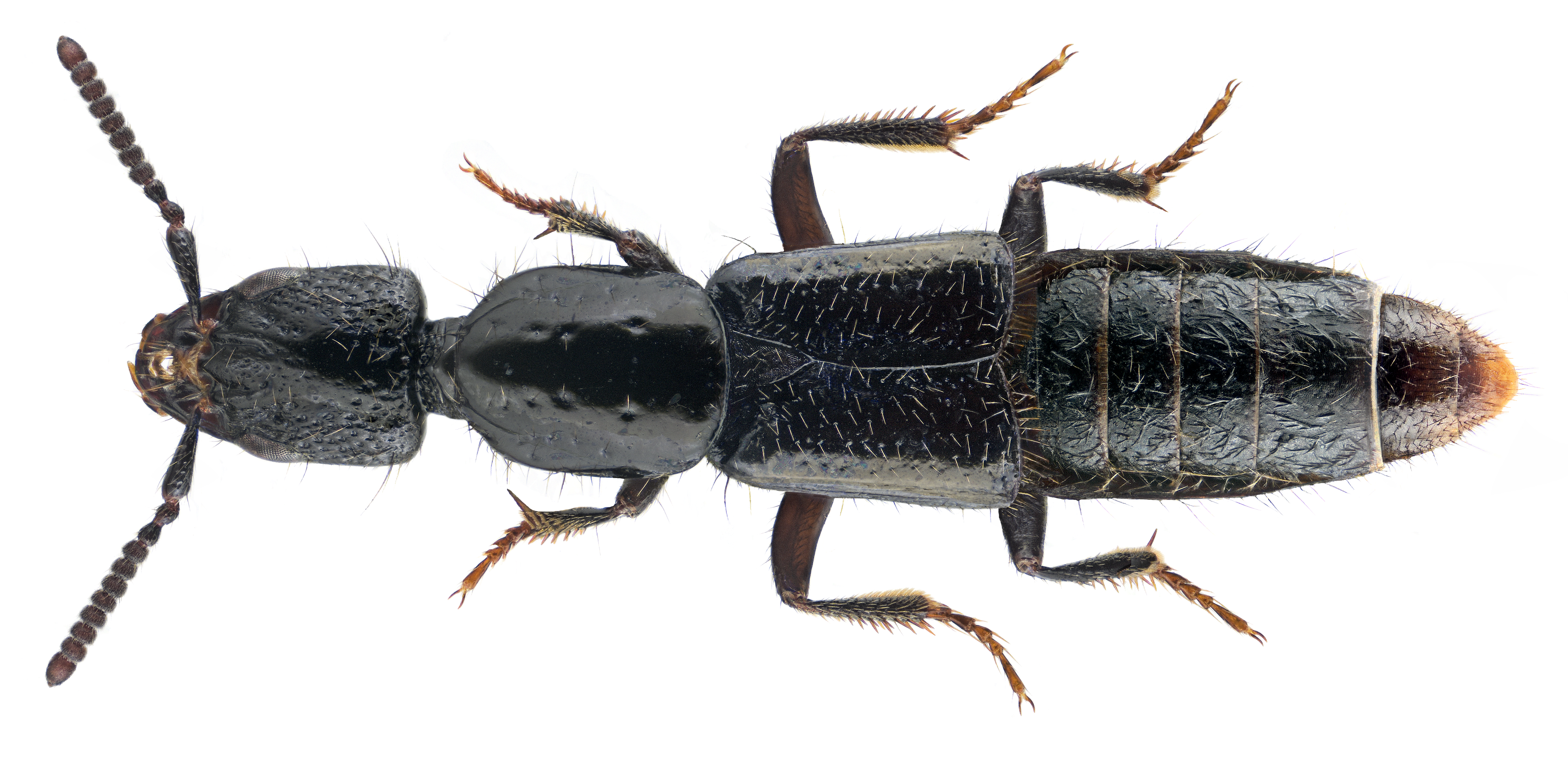
- Gyrohypnus fracticornis

Scientific classification
- Kingdom: Animalia
- Phylum: Arthropoda
- Class: Insecta
- Order: Coleoptera
- Suborder: Polyphaga
- Infraorder: Staphyliniformia
- Family: Staphylinidae
- Subfamily: Staphylininae
- Tribe: Xantholinini
- Genus: Gyrohypnus; Leach, 1819

Species
- 35 species (see text)

Synonyms
- Hyponygrus Tottenham, 1940

= Gyrohypnus =

Genus of beetles

Gyrohypnus is a genus of beetles belonging to the family Staphylinidae. The genus was described by William Elford Leach in 1819. It has cosmopolitan distribution.

== Species ==
There are about 35 recognized species:

- Gyrohypnus angustatus Stephens, 1833
- Gyrohypnus atratus (Heer, 1839)
- Gyrohypnus birmanus (Cameron, 1932)
- Gyrohypnus campbelli Smetana, 1982
- Gyrohypnus ebneri (Scheerpeltz, 1925)
- Gyrohypnus fracticornis (Müller, 1776)
- Gyrohypnus fuscipes (Linnaeus, 1758)
- Gyrohypnus keijiroi (Y. Watanabe & Y. Shibata, 1965)
- Gyrohypnus khachikovi Bordoni, 2011
- Gyrohypnus khola Bordoni, 2002
- Gyrohypnus leopoldinus Bordoni, 2016
- Gyrohypnus liber Assing, 2003
- Gyrohypnus marginalis (Wollaston, 1862)
- Gyrohypnus maximus Bordoni, 2002
- Gyrohypnus nuristanicus Bordoni, 2016
- Gyrohypnus ochripennis (Eppelsheim, 1892)
- Gyrohypnus paramerum Bordoni, 2016
- Gyrohypnus punctulatus (Paykull, 1789)
- Gyrohypnus qinghai Bordoni, 2013
- Gyrohypnus remotus (Eppelsheim, 1895)
- Gyrohypnus rougemonti Bordoni, 2016
- Gyrohypnus schuelkei Assing, 2003
- Gyrohypnus setosus Bordoni, 2017
- Gyrohypnus shimba Bordoni, 2016
- Gyrohypnus sichuanensis Zheng & Fa-Ke, 1995
- Gyrohypnus silvanus (Peyerimhoff, 1917)
- Gyrohypnus smetanai Bordoni, 2002
- Gyrohypnus stercorosus Bordoni, 2016
- Gyrohypnus swatae Bordoni, 2002
- Gyrohypnus tropicus Bordoni, 2016
- Gyrohypnus ugandensis Bordoni, 2016
- Gyrohypnus vomer Assing, 2003
- Gyrohypnus wagneri (Scheerpeltz, 1926)
- Gyrohypnus wutaishanensis Bordoni, 2000
- Gyrohypnus yilderimi Bordoni, 2003
