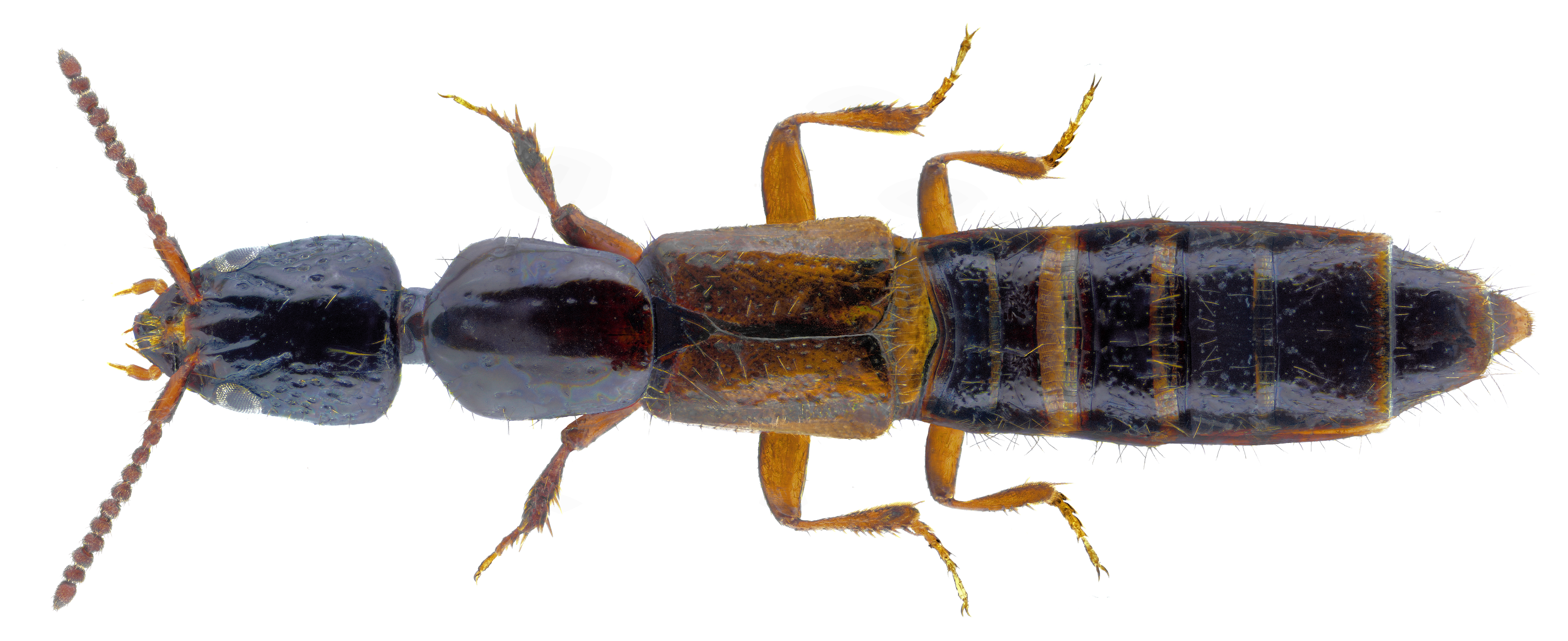
- Phacophallus parumpunctatus

Scientific classification
- Kingdom: Animalia
- Phylum: Arthropoda
- Clade: Pancrustacea
- Class: Insecta
- Order: Coleoptera
- Suborder: Polyphaga
- Infraorder: Staphyliniformia
- Family: Staphylinidae
- Tribe: Xantholinini
- Genus: Phacophallus; Coiffait, 1956

Species
- 28 species (see text)

= Phacophallus =

Genus of beetles

Phacophallus is a genus of beetles belonging to the family Staphylinidae. The genus has almost cosmopolitan distribution.

== Species ==
There are about 28 recognized species:

- Phacophallus afrus Bordoni, 2016
- Phacophallus arabicus Coiffait, 1979
- Phacophallus bangoranus Bordoni, 2016
- Phacophallus congoensis Bordoni, 2016
- Phacophallus elaeis Bordoni, 2016
- Phacophallus elephantorum Bordoni, 2016
- Phacophallus erythraeus Bordoni, 2016
- Phacophallus flavipennis (Kraatz, 1859)
- Phacophallus ghanensis Bordoni, 2016
- Phacophallus insularis Bordoni, 2016
- Phacophallus japonicus (Cameron, 1933)
- Phacophallus martensi Bordoni, 2002
- Phacophallus mirus Bordoni, 2016
- Phacophallus nigerianus Bordoni, 2016
- Phacophallus omaniticus Bordoni, 2021
- Phacophallus pallidipennis (Motschulsky, 1858)
- Phacophallus papuensis (Fauvel, 1878)
- Phacophallus parumpunctatus (Gyllenhal, 1827)
- Phacophallus philippinus Bordoni, 2017
- Phacophallus politus (Cameron, 1951)
- Phacophallus povolnyi Bordoni, 1975
- Phacophallus sahariensis Coiffait, 1968
- Phacophallus sudanensis Bordoni, 2016
- Phacophallus trigonocephalus (Kraatz, 1859)
- Phacophallus tuniseus Bordoni, 2007
- Phacophallus uhligi Bordoni, 2016
- Phacophallus unispinosus Bordoni, 2016
- Phacophallus xanthopygus (Scheerpeltz, 1974)
