= Platyprosopus =

Scientific classification
- Kingdom: Animalia
- Phylum: Arthropoda
- Clade: Pancrustacea
- Class: Insecta
- Order: Coleoptera
- Suborder: Polyphaga
- Infraorder: Staphyliniformia
- Family: Staphylinidae
- Subfamily: Staphylininae
- Tribe: Platyprosopini; Lynch, 1884
- Genus: Platyprosopus; Mannerheim, 1830

Genus of beetles

Platyprosopini is a tribe of rove beetles in the subfamily Staphylininae. It was first described by Lynch in 1884. It contains one genus, Platyprosopus, with 64 accepted species.

== Species ==
- Platyprosopus aequalis
- Platyprosopus aethiopicus
- Platyprosopus amazonicus
- Platyprosopus argentinus
- Platyprosopus arrowi
- Platyprosopus bagdadensis
- Platyprosopus beduinus
- Platyprosopus bengalensis
- Platyprosopus bernhaueri
- Platyprosopus bhutanicus
- Platyprosopus biblus
- Platyprosopus bilineatus
- Platyprosopus birmanus
- Platyprosopus biseriatus
- Platyprosopus bruchi
- Platyprosopus bucephalus
- Platyprosopus consularis
- Platyprosopus daressalamensis
- Platyprosopus elatus
- Platyprosopus elongatus
- Platyprosopus fraternus
- Platyprosopus frontalis
- Platyprosopus fuliginosus
- Platyprosopus fulvaster
- Platyprosopus fulvicollis
- Platyprosopus ghidinii
- Platyprosopus grandiceps
- Platyprosopus gridellii
- Platyprosopus hierichonticus
- Platyprosopus himalayaensis
- Platyprosopus indawgyianus
- Platyprosopus indicus
- Platyprosopus keiseri
- Platyprosopus kraatzi
- Platyprosopus laevicollis
- Platyprosopus laosianus
- Platyprosopus laticeps
- Platyprosopus latitarsalis
- Platyprosopus longicollis
- Platyprosopus major
- Platyprosopus marshalli
- Platyprosopus mateui
- Platyprosopus maximus
- Platyprosopus meghalayaensis
- Platyprosopus mexicanus
- Platyprosopus minor
- Platyprosopus myanmarensis
- Platyprosopus nigriventris
- Platyprosopus niloticus
- Platyprosopus ochraceus
- Platyprosopus opacifrons
- Platyprosopus pallescens
- Platyprosopus parallelus
- Platyprosopus punctatissimus
- Platyprosopus rectus
- Platyprosopus rossii
- Platyprosopus rufescens
- Platyprosopus ruficollis
- Platyprosopus similis
- Platyprosopus socius
- Platyprosopus tamulus
- Platyprosopus tarumaensis
- Platyprosopus tchadicus
- Platyprosopus tongyai
