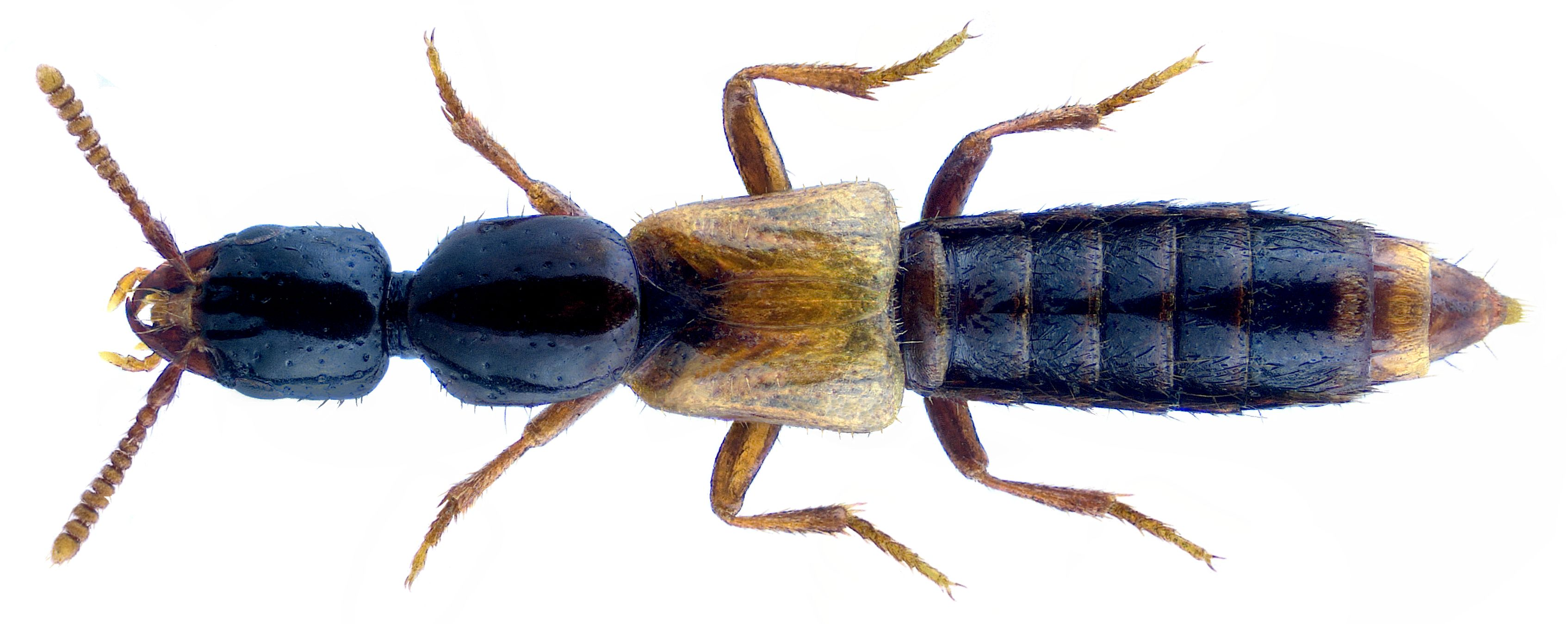
- Hypnogyra angularis

Scientific classification
- Kingdom: Animalia
- Phylum: Arthropoda
- Class: Insecta
- Order: Coleoptera
- Suborder: Polyphaga
- Infraorder: Staphyliniformia
- Family: Staphylinidae
- Tribe: Xantholinini
- Genus: Hypnogyra; Casey, 1906

Synonyms
- Phalacrolinus Coiffait, 1972

= Hypnogyra =

Genus of beetles

Hypnogyra is a genus of beetles belonging to the family Staphylinidae. The species of this genus are found in Europe, Japan and Northern America.

== Species ==
There are about 16 recognized species:

- Hypnogyra angularis (Ganglbauer, 1895)
- Hypnogyra baicalensis (Fauvel, 1875)
- Hypnogyra formosae (Cameron, 1949)
- Hypnogyra glabroides (Coiffait, 1962)
- Hypnogyra gularis (J.L. LeConte, 1880)
- Hypnogyra henanica Bordoni, 2013
- Hypnogyra hoffmanni (Bernhauer, 1928)
- Hypnogyra laevissima (Reitter, 1898)
- Hypnogyra micans (Casey, 1906)
- Hypnogyra monserrati (Outerelo, 1976)
- Hypnogyra orientalis Bordoni, 2017
- Hypnogyra shibatai Bordoni, 2002
- Hypnogyra sichuanica Bordoni, 2003
- Hypnogyra sinica Bordoni, 2013
- Hypnogyra tenebrosa Bordoni, 1997
- Hypnogyra tubula (Sharp, 1889)
