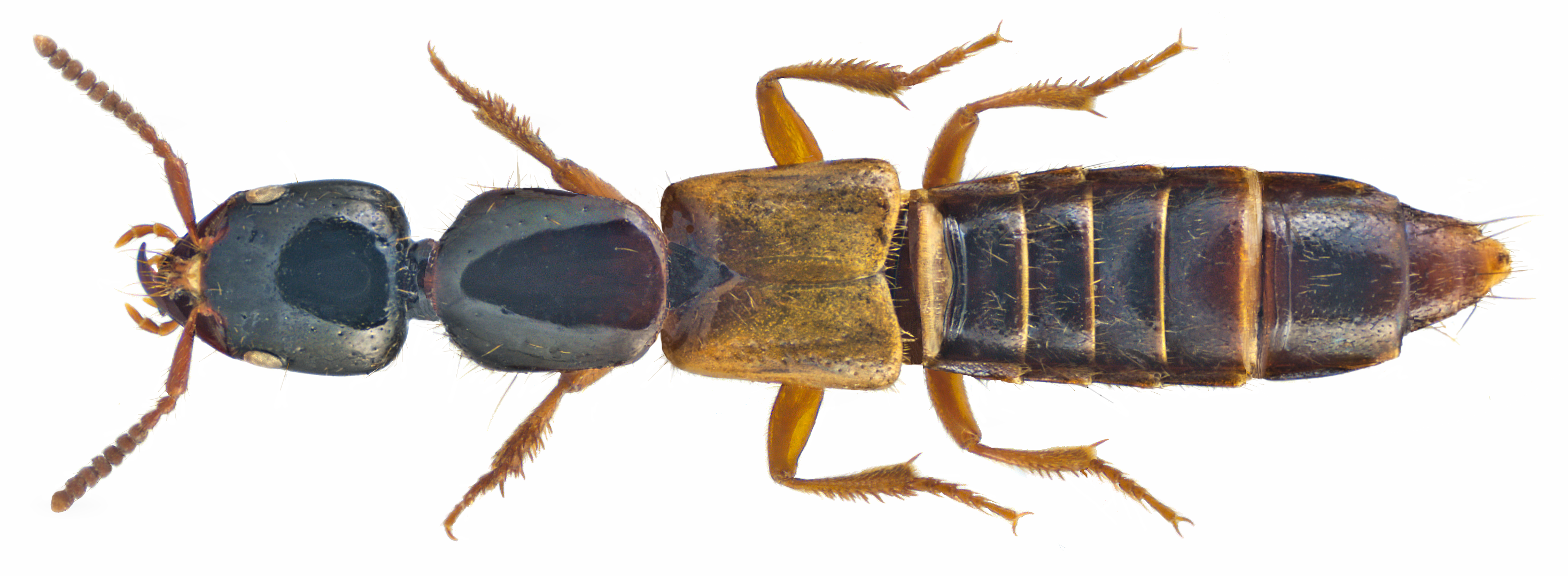
- Megalinus flavocinctus

Scientific classification
- Domain: Eukaryota
- Kingdom: Animalia
- Phylum: Arthropoda
- Class: Insecta
- Order: Coleoptera
- Suborder: Polyphaga
- Infraorder: Staphyliniformia
- Family: Staphylinidae
- Tribe: Xantholinini
- Genus: Megalinus; Mulsant & Rey, 1877

= Megalinus =

Genus of beetles

Megalinus is a genus of beetles belonging to the family Staphylinidae.

Species:

- Megalinus glabratus
