= Diochini =

Scientific classification
- Kingdom: Animalia
- Phylum: Arthropoda
- Clade: Pancrustacea
- Class: Insecta
- Order: Coleoptera
- Suborder: Polyphaga
- Infraorder: Staphyliniformia
- Family: Staphylinidae
- Subfamily: Staphylininae
- Tribe: Diochini (Casey, 1906)

Tribe of beetles

Diochini is a tribe of rove beetles in the family Staphylinidae. There are at least 2 genera and 84 described species in Diochini.

== Genera ==
- Antarctothius (Coiffait & Sáiz, 1969)
- Diochus (Erichson, 1839)

Coomania was a member of the tribe until 2020, when it was moved to its own monotypic tribe Coomaniini.
