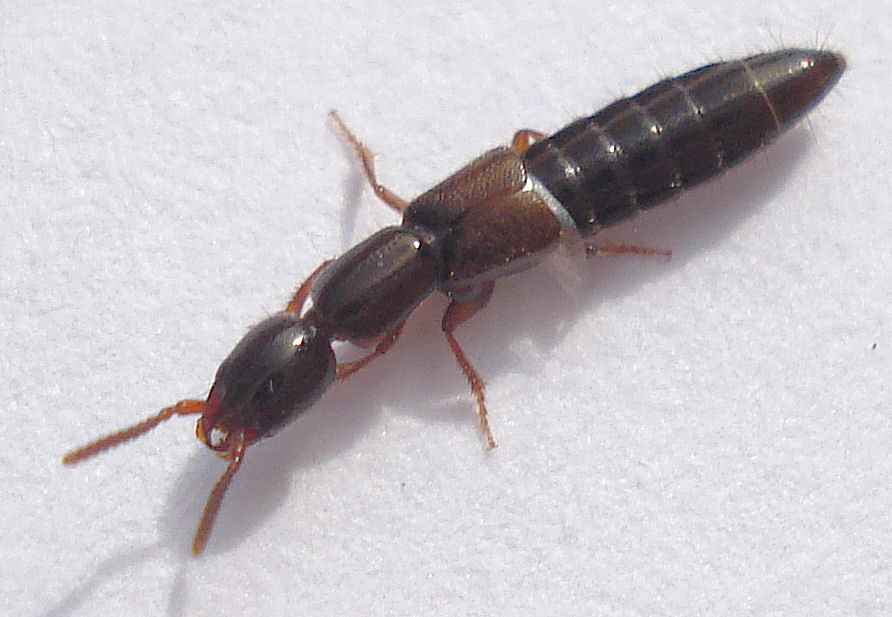
- Xantholinus sp.

Scientific classification
- Kingdom: Animalia
- Phylum: Arthropoda
- Class: Insecta
- Order: Coleoptera
- Suborder: Polyphaga
- Infraorder: Staphyliniformia
- Family: Staphylinidae
- Subfamily: Staphylininae
- Tribe: Xantholinini
- Genus: Xantholinus; Dejean, 1821

Species
- 274+

= Xantholinus =

Genus of beetles

Xantholinus is a genus of the beetle family Staphylinidae, the rove beetles. They can be found throughout the world. Most are native to the Palearctic realm, and some have been introduced to North America.

The larvae of at least some species are bioluminescent.

There are about 274 species in this genus.

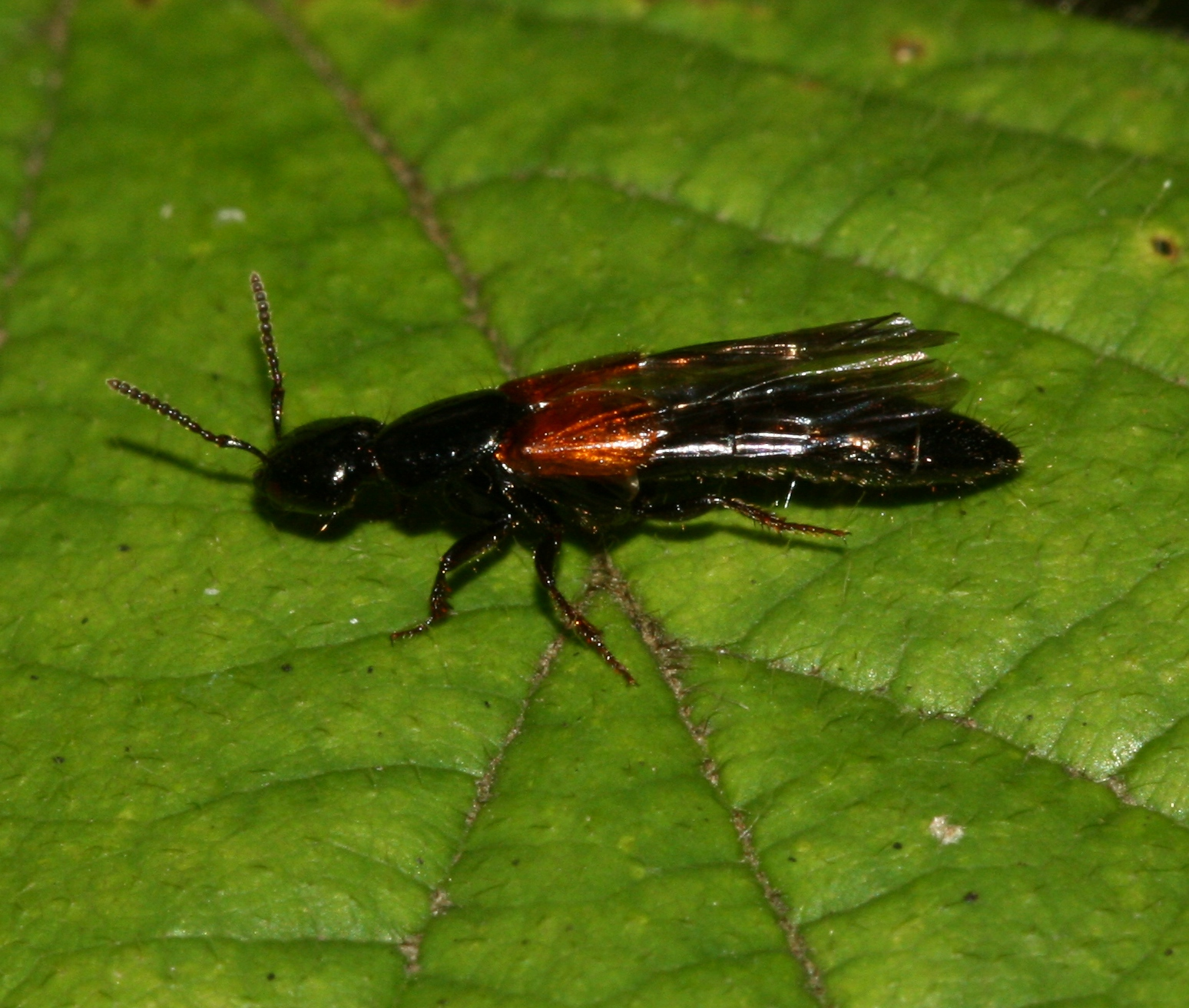
Xantholinus glabratus

Species include:

- Xantholinus appenninicola (Steel, 1946)
- Xantholinus baeticus (Bordoni, 1975)
- Xantholinus balearicus (Coiffait, 1962)
- Xantholinus bonomettoi (Bordoni, 1972)
- Xantholinus bordonii (Coiffait, 1970)
- Xantholinus bulgaricus (Coiffait, 1972)
- Xantholinus cerrutii (Coiffait, 1964)
- Xantholinus coiffaiti (H. Franz, 1966)
- Xantholinus colasi (Jarrige, 1941)
- Xantholinus devillei (Coiffait, 1956)
- Xantholinus elegans (Olivier, 1795)
- Xantholinus euboicus (Korge, 1973)
- Xantholinus fortepunctatus (Motschulsky, 1860)
- Xantholinus franzi (Bordoni, 1973)
- Xantholinus fuenteanus (Reitter, 1901)
- Xantholinus gastraeus (Gistel, 1857)
- Xantholinus graecus (Kraatz, 1858)
- Xantholinus gridellii (Coiffait, 1956)
- Xantholinus humidicola (Gistel, 1857)
- Xantholinus ibericus (Steel, 1950)
- Xantholinus maritimus (Reitter, 1908)
- Xantholinus morandi (Coiffait, 1958)
- Xantholinus nicolasi (Coiffait, 1972)
- Xantholinus occultans (Gistel, 1857)
- Xantholinus padus (Coiffait, 1973)
- Xantholinus pantokratoris (Bordoni, 1975)
- Xantholinus perezi (Outerelo, 1976)
- Xantholinus phenicus (Coiffait, 1971)
- Xantholinus proceroides (Coiffait, 1971)
- Xantholinus procerus (Erichson, 1839)
- Xantholinus quadratus (Stephens, 1833)
- Xantholinus ruffoi (Bordoni, 1972)
- Xantholinus rufipennis (Erichson, 1839)
- Xantholinus rufipes (P. Lucas, 1846)
- Xantholinus rufus (Grimmer, 1841)
- Xantholinus sardous (Gridelli, 1947)
- Xantholinus sidonensis (Coiffait, 1956)
- Xantholinus sighisoarae (Bordoni, 1973)
- Xantholinus styriacus (Grimmer, 1841)
- Xantholinus tothi (Bordoni, 1986)
- Xantholinus translucidus (Scriba, 1870)
- Xantholinus vandalicus (Bordoni, 1973)
- Xantholinus varnensis (Coiffait, 1972)
- Xantholinus vinicolor (Ushakov, 1989)
- Xantholinus vitalei (Bernhauer, 1943)
- Xantholinus wrasei (Bordoni, 1989)
- Xantholinus zalathnae (Bordoni, 1973)
