= Pictured rove beetle =

- Specimen from a shore on Olympic Peninsula, Washington

Scientific classification
- Kingdom: Animalia
- Phylum: Arthropoda
- Class: Insecta
- Order: Coleoptera
- Suborder: Polyphaga
- Infraorder: Staphyliniformia
- Family: Staphylinidae
- Subfamily: Staphylininae
- Tribe: Staphylinini
- Subtribe: Staphylinina
- Genus: Thinopinus; LeConte, 1852
- Species: T. pictus

Binomial name
- Thinopinus pictus LeConte, 1852

Species of beetle

The pictured rove beetle (Thinopinus pictus) is a wingless rove beetle which lives on the sandy beaches of the West Coast of the United States from southern Alaska to Baja California. It is nocturnal, emerging at night from temporary sand burrows to feed on beach hoppers (Orchestoidea). It is the only species in the genus Thinopinus.

== Identification ==
Like other rove beetles, T. pictus has shortened elytra, so that most of its abdomen is exposed. Males average 17 millimetres (0.67 in), females average 18 mm (0.71 in). Males possess a cleft in the last abdominal sternite, which makes them readily discernible from females. Their cryptic coloration varies geographically in response to lighter colored sand in the southern part of their range. Populations north of central California tend to be darker in response to the dark volcanic sand, while those in the southern range are quite pale. Because of this variation, T. pictus was once thought to be made up of two subspecies.

== Ecology ==
Thinopinus pictus inhabits the sandy intertidal zone; during the day, they hide in temporary sand burrows or under kelp and beach debris with a preference to inhabit the wettest and softest sand available. At night they emerge and move to the high tide level to find prey. Individuals switch between inactive ambush predation and active foraging for their prey, which consists mostly of beach hoppers (Amphipoda). They have also been observed eating beach flies, isopods, and other T. pictus. Males seem to feed less than females, but are more active than females, possibly to increase the chance of finding a mate.

== Reproduction ==
The breeding season is thought to be from August to October. Dissected females have been shown to carry only 2–3 eggs, which are oviposited singly in the sand. These beetles likely have long lifespans in order to reproduce sufficiently. In the laboratory, eggs hatch at about 14 days. Larvae are whitish with black markings. The duration of their instars is unknown.
