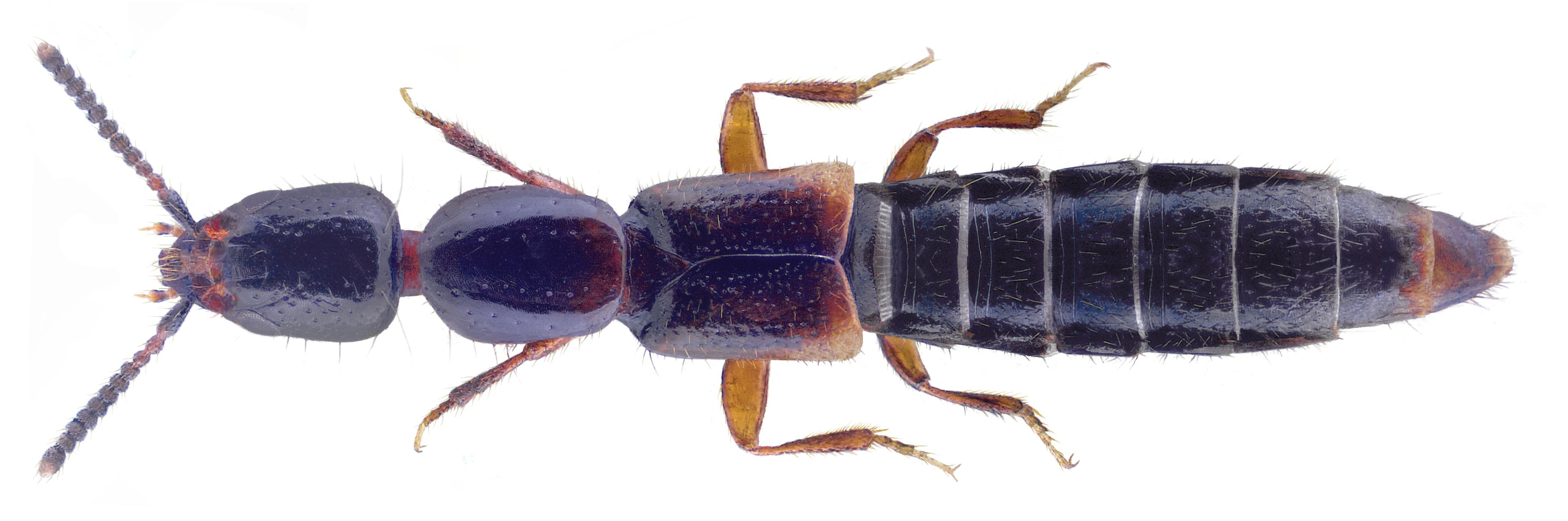

Scientific classification
- Kingdom: Animalia
- Phylum: Arthropoda
- Class: Insecta
- Order: Coleoptera
- Suborder: Polyphaga
- Infraorder: Staphyliniformia
- Family: Staphylinidae
- Genus: Leptacinus
- Species: L. pusillus

Binomial name
- Leptacinus pusillus (Stephens, 1833)

= Leptacinus pusillus =

Species of beetle

Leptacinus pusillus is a species of beetle belonging to the family Staphylinidae.

It is native to Europe and Northern America.
