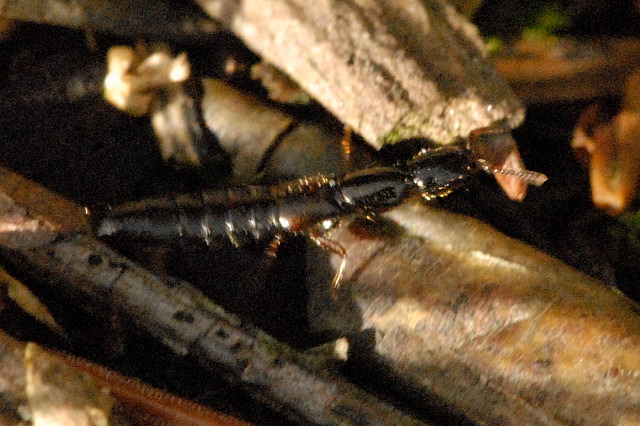

Scientific classification
- Kingdom: Animalia
- Phylum: Arthropoda
- Class: Insecta
- Order: Coleoptera
- Suborder: Polyphaga
- Infraorder: Staphyliniformia
- Family: Staphylinidae
- Genus: Leptacinus
- Species: L. formicetorum

Binomial name
- Leptacinus formicetorum Märkel, 1841

= Leptacinus formicetorum =

Species of beetle

Leptacinus formicetorum is a species of beetle belonging to the family Staphylinidae.

It is native to Europe.
