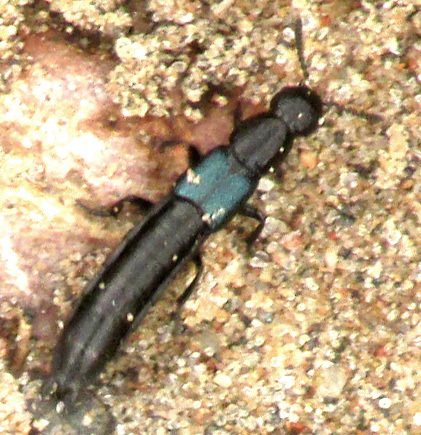

Scientific classification
- Kingdom: Animalia
- Phylum: Arthropoda
- Clade: Pancrustacea
- Class: Insecta
- Order: Coleoptera
- Suborder: Polyphaga
- Infraorder: Staphyliniformia
- Family: Staphylinidae
- Subfamily: Staphylininae
- Tribe: Staphylinini
- Subtribe: Philonthina
- Genus: Flohria; Sharp, 1884
- Species: F. subcoerulea

Binomial name
- Flohria subcoerulea ( J. L. LeConte, 1863)

Synonyms
- Trigonophorus subcoeruleus LeConte, 1863; Flohria laticornis Sharp, 1884

= Flohria =

Species of insect

Flohria subcoerulea is a species in the family of the rove beetles, the Staphylinidae. It is the only species in the monotypic genus Flohria.

== Description ==
Flohria subcoerulea is distinguished from other species in the subtribe Philonthina largely by obscure technical features. However, here are some easy to see features of this species:

- Its body is unusually exelongate and cylindrical, with an especially long abdomen longer than the combined head, top part of the prothorax and the elytra.
- The top part of the prothorax is somewhat longer than wide.
- Its body is up to 15.2mm long (~5/8 inch).
- The antennae are relatively short and thick.
- The head shape, wider than long and narrower than the top part of the prothorax, is unusual.
- The body is all black except for the elytra, which are metallic blue.
- Mandibles are somewhat prominent and stout, with 2-3 teeth on the inner edges in addition to the apex.

== Distribution ==
Flohria subcoerulea occurs from south-central Texas south through Mexico to northern Costa Rica in Central America.

== Habitat ==
Flohria subcoerulea is considered a rare species, though it has been captured in an exceptionally broad range of elevations, climates and habitats, from tropical and subtopical forests near sea level to temperate forests of volcanic peaks at nearly 3000 meters in elevation (~9850 ft); also it's been found in a suburban garden. The image of an individual shown on this page was taken on a narrow trail through an area of scrub and ranchland, at an elevation of ~1900 meters (~6200 ft).

== Taxonomy ==
Flohria subcoerulea belongs to the species-rich subtribe Staphylininae, which comprises 70 genera worldwide. In 1884 the single species in the concurrently erected genus Flohria was first described by David Sharp and named Flohria laticornis. So it remained until the year 2000 when Gastrisus subcoeruleus, which had been described in 1863, was transferred into Flohria, becoming Flohria subcoeruleus, the second species in the genus. In 2002, Flohria laticornis was determined to be the same taxon as Flohria subcoeruleus. Since Flohria subcoeruleus, as Gastrisus subcoeruleus, had been described before Flohria subcoerulea, the two taxa were lumped under the name Flohria subcoerulea, and the genus Flohria returned to having a single species.

The name Flohria laticornis is considered a "subjective junior synonym" of Flohria subcoerulea. That term is used when, in a manner based on a personal opinion and not external facts or evidence, one published name is chosen over another because it's older. Apparently, this term is used because the oldest description for the taxon, under the name Gastrisus subcoeruleus, was based on a certain type specimen, while the author's preferred name, Flohria subcoerulea, was based on another type specimen, which had been described at a later date.

As of 2015, there were few studies including Flohria, but enough information, including phylogenetic studies of the Staphylininae, had been gathered to consider the hypothesis that the genus occupied a basal position within the Philonthina -- that it was sister to the remaining genera of the substribe, thus perhaps somewhat of a relict species.

The type collection was said to have been taken in "Almolonga, Jalcomulco, Uruapan, Mexico" by Julius Flohr.

== Etymology ==
In 1884, David Sharp named the genus Flohria in honor of Julius Flohr, who discovered and collected many new insect species in Mexico, especially beetles.

In the species name, subcoerulea, the sub is from Latin with various meanings such as under, below, secretly and, in our case "near". The -coerulea is from the Latin caeruleus, meaning "blue" or "bluish". Thus ''Flohria subcoerulea is somewhat blue because of its metallic blue elytra.
