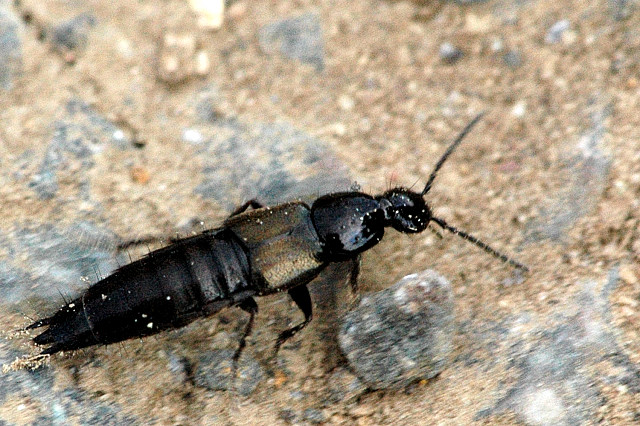

Scientific classification
- Kingdom: Animalia
- Phylum: Arthropoda
- Clade: Pancrustacea
- Class: Insecta
- Order: Coleoptera
- Suborder: Polyphaga
- Infraorder: Staphyliniformia
- Family: Staphylinidae
- Genus: Philonthus
- Species: P. cognatus

Binomial name
- Philonthus cognatus (Stephens, 1832)

= Philonthus cognatus =

Species of beetle

Philonthus cognatus is a rove beetle. Adults are 8 to 10 mm long. They are mainly black in colour, although the elytra have a metallic sheen, and are profusely pitted. A distinctive feature of this species is that the underside of the first antennal segment is yellow, contrasting with the black upperside. It is a common species in Britain. It is also found in Belarus.
