= Coomania tonkinensis =

Scientific classification
- Kingdom: Animalia
- Phylum: Arthropoda
- Class: Insecta
- Order: Coleoptera
- Suborder: Polyphaga
- Infraorder: Staphyliniformia
- Family: Staphylinidae
- Subfamily: Staphylininae
- Tribe: Coomaniini; Żyła & Solodovnikov, 2019
- Genus: Coomania; Cameron, 1939
- Species: C. tonkinensis

Binomial name
- Coomania tonkinensis Cameron, 1939

Species of beetle

Coomania tonkinensis is a species of beetle of the Staphylinidae family, Staphylininae subfamily. It was first described by Malcolm Cameron to the tribe Diochini, but in 2020 moved to its own tribe Coomaniini. The species is found in Vietnam and Sabah, Malaysia.

The elongate 5 mm beetle is shining black with antennae and legs reddish-yellow. The subtriangual head narrower than the thorax. Rather short antennae. Elytra as long and as broad as the thorax.
