= Nudobius =

Scientific classification
- Domain: Eukaryota
- Kingdom: Animalia
- Phylum: Arthropoda
- Class: Insecta
- Order: Coleoptera
- Suborder: Polyphaga
- Infraorder: Staphyliniformia
- Family: Staphylinidae
- Genus: Nudobius; Thomson, 1860

Genus of beetles

Nudobius is a genus of beetles belonging to the family Staphylinidae.

The species of this genus are found in Europe and Northern America.

Species:

- Nudobius abessinus Bernhauer, 1915
- Nudobius africanus Bernhauer, 1912
