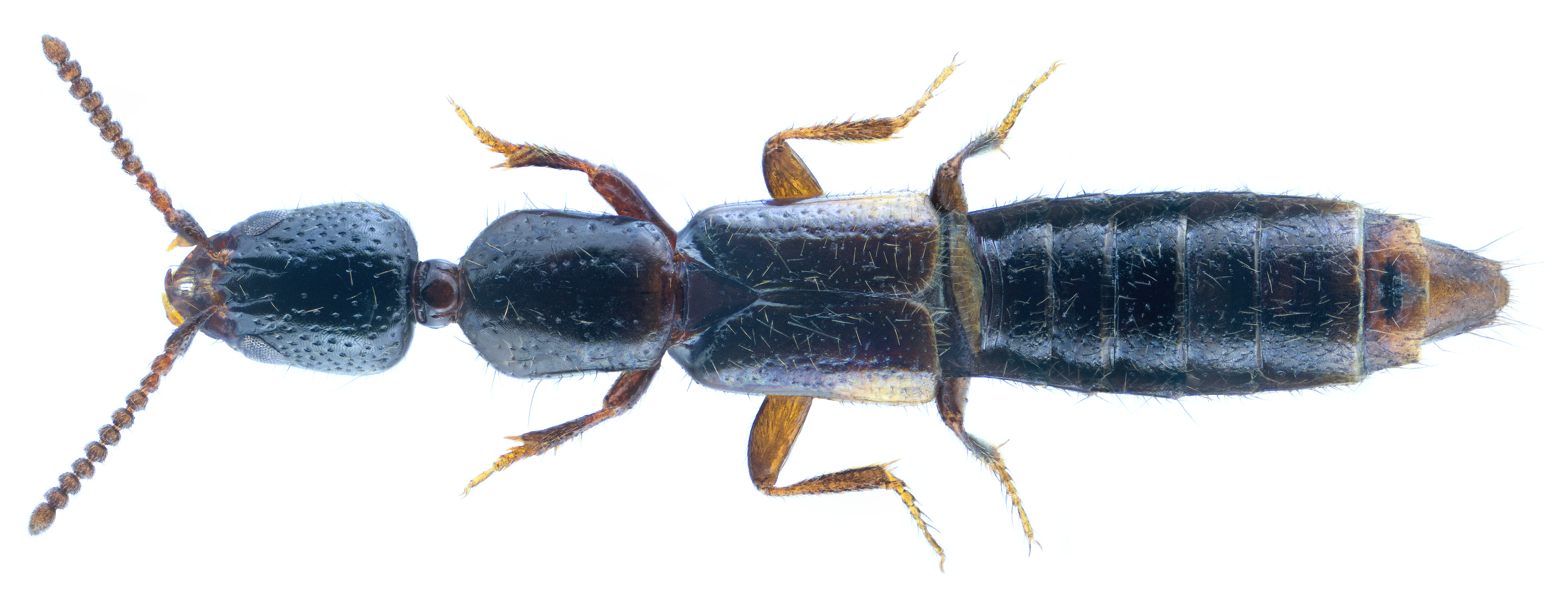

Scientific classification
- Kingdom: Animalia
- Phylum: Arthropoda
- Clade: Pancrustacea
- Class: Insecta
- Order: Coleoptera
- Suborder: Polyphaga
- Infraorder: Staphyliniformia
- Family: Staphylinidae
- Genus: Leptacinus
- Species: L. intermedius

Binomial name
- Leptacinus intermedius Donisthorpe, 1935

= Leptacinus intermedius =

Species of beetle

Leptacinus intermedius is a European rove beetle, described in 1935 by Horace Donisthorpe. Like most staphylinids, L. intermedius and its larvae are predatory upon other insects. Members of this family can usually be identified by their very short elytra, which leave three to six abdominal segments exposed. The beetle can also be identified by the size of the aedeagus in males.
