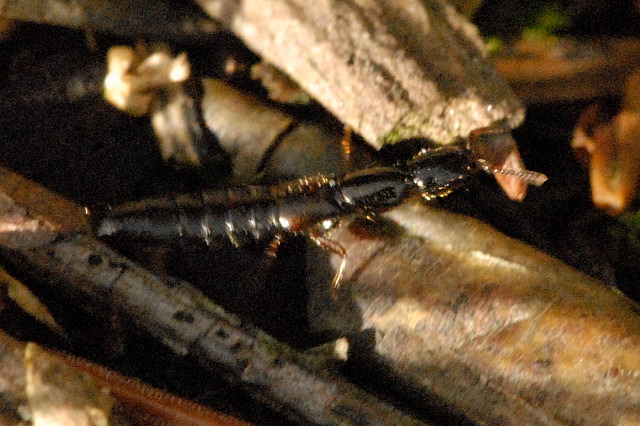
- Leptacinus formicetorum

Scientific classification
- Domain: Eukaryota
- Kingdom: Animalia
- Phylum: Arthropoda
- Class: Insecta
- Order: Coleoptera
- Suborder: Polyphaga
- Infraorder: Staphyliniformia
- Family: Staphylinidae
- Tribe: Xantholinini
- Genus: Leptacinus; Erichson, 1839

Synonyms
- Leptacinodes Casey, 1906

= Leptacinus =

Genus of beetles

Leptacinus is a genus of beetles belonging to the family Staphylinidae. The genus has cosmopolitan distribution.

== Species ==
There are about 46 recognized species:

- Leptacinus afghanus Bordoni, 2016
- Leptacinus ajax Tottenham, 1949
- Leptacinus apicipennis Fairmaire & Germain, 1861
- Leptacinus armeniacus Coiffait, 1966
- Leptacinus astrakhanicus K.A. Grebennikov, 2001
- Leptacinus batychrus (Gyllenhal, 1827)
- Leptacinus curicanus Coiffait & Sáiz, 1964
- Leptacinus dieganus Fauvel, 1905
- Leptacinus dubius Bordoni, 1975
- Leptacinus faunus Coiffait, 1956
- Leptacinus ferrugineus Bernhauer, 1927
- Leptacinus formicetorum Märkel, 1841
- Leptacinus germaini Coiffait & Sáiz, 1964
- Leptacinus guadarramus Outerelo, 1975
- Leptacinus harbinensis Bordoni, 2000
- Leptacinus intermedius Donisthorpe, 1936
- Leptacinus karakorus Coiffait, 1975
- Leptacinus khachikovi Bordoni, 2011
- Leptacinus klapperichi Coiffait, 1981
- Leptacinus lecontei Blackwelder, 1944
- Leptacinus longipennis Cameron, 1951
- Leptacinus magniceps Bernhauer, 1922
- Leptacinus malayanus Y. Watanabe & Y. Shibata, 1976
- Leptacinus marocanus Coiffait, 1969
- Leptacinus merkli Ádám, 1987
- Leptacinus microphthalmus Fauvel, 1905
- Leptacinus mirus Assing, 2011
- Leptacinus nigerrimus Coiffait, 1971
- Leptacinus oscillans Sharp, 1885
- Leptacinus othioides Baudi di Selve, 1869
- Leptacinus pauliani Jarrige, 1978
- Leptacinus politus Fauvel, 1905
- Leptacinus priapus Coiffait, 1956
- Leptacinus pusillus (Stephens, 1833)
- Leptacinus quadrisulciceps Lea, 1925
- Leptacinus rufonitens Coiffait, 1966
- Leptacinus secretus Cameron, 1933
- Leptacinus simeki Bordoni, 1975
- Leptacinus stradomskyi Khachikov, 2019
- Leptacinus sulcifrons (Stephens, 1833)
- Leptacinus unicolor Cameron, 1937
- Leptacinus yemeniticus Bordoni, 2010
