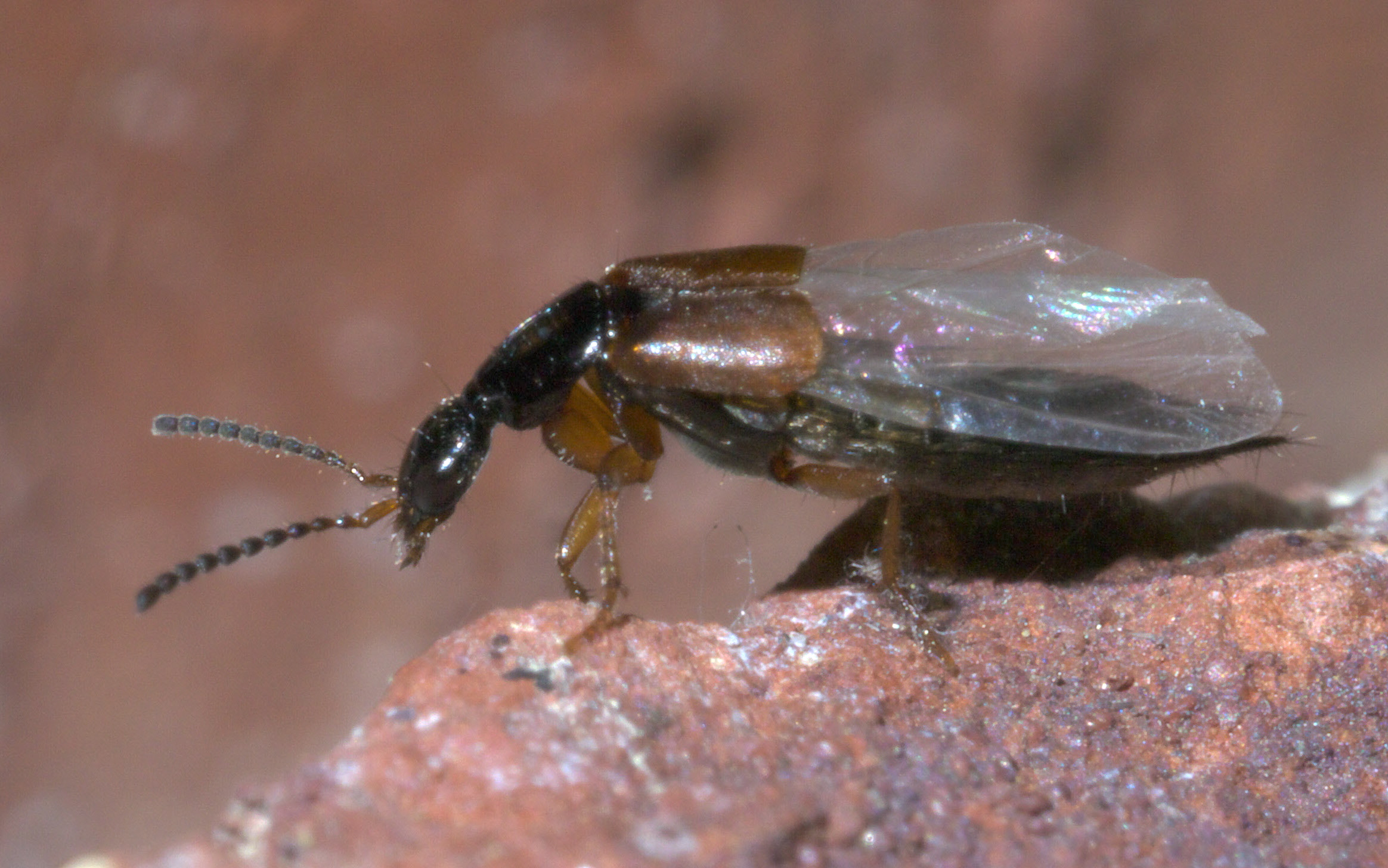

Scientific classification
- Kingdom: Animalia
- Phylum: Arthropoda
- Class: Insecta
- Order: Coleoptera
- Suborder: Polyphaga
- Infraorder: Staphyliniformia
- Family: Staphylinidae
- Tribe: Staphylinini
- Subtribe: Philonthina
- Genus: Philonthus; Stephens, 1829

Diversity
- at least 250 species

= Philonthus =

Genus of beetles

Philonthus is a genus of large rove beetles in the family Staphylinidae. There are more than 380 described species in Philonthus.

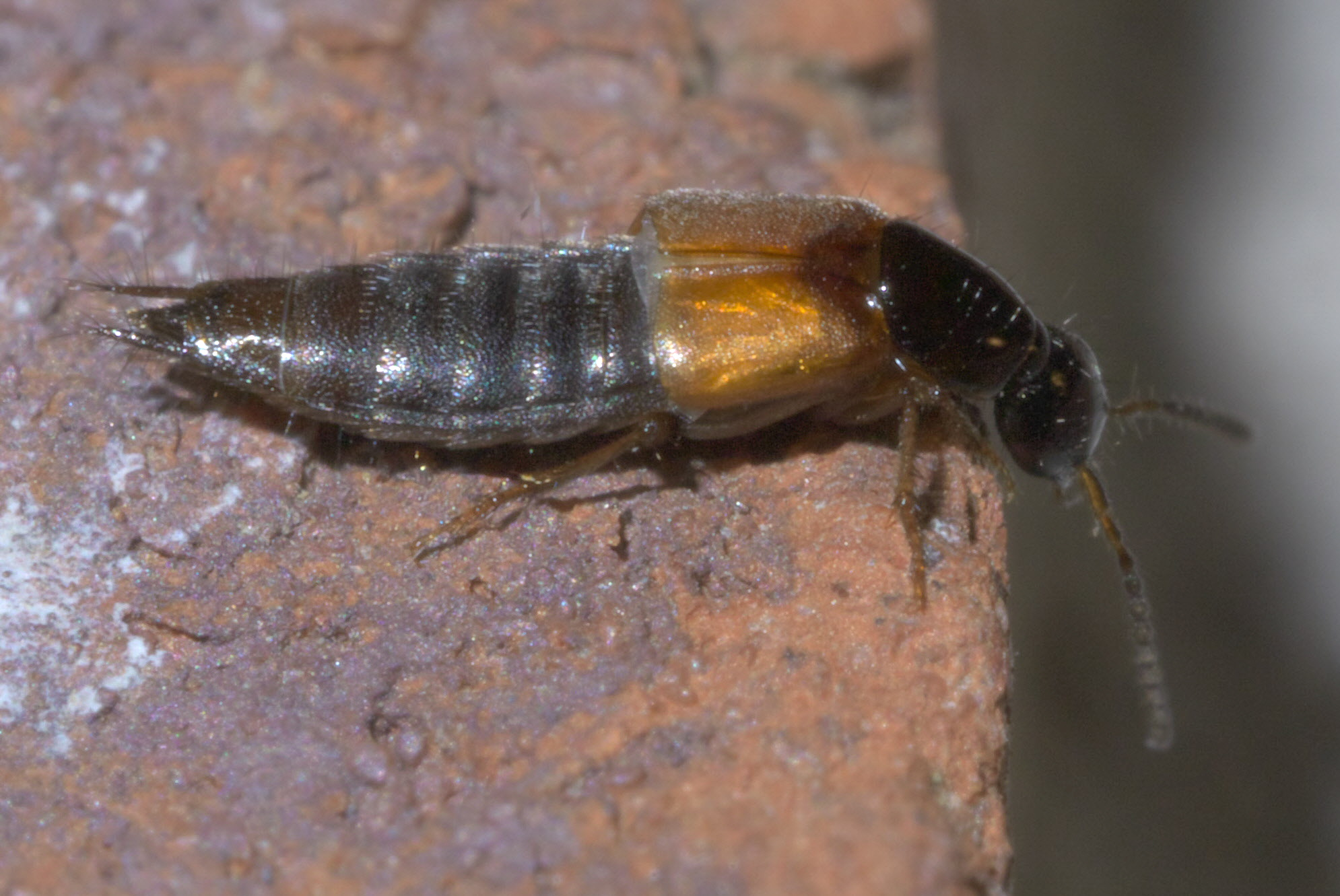

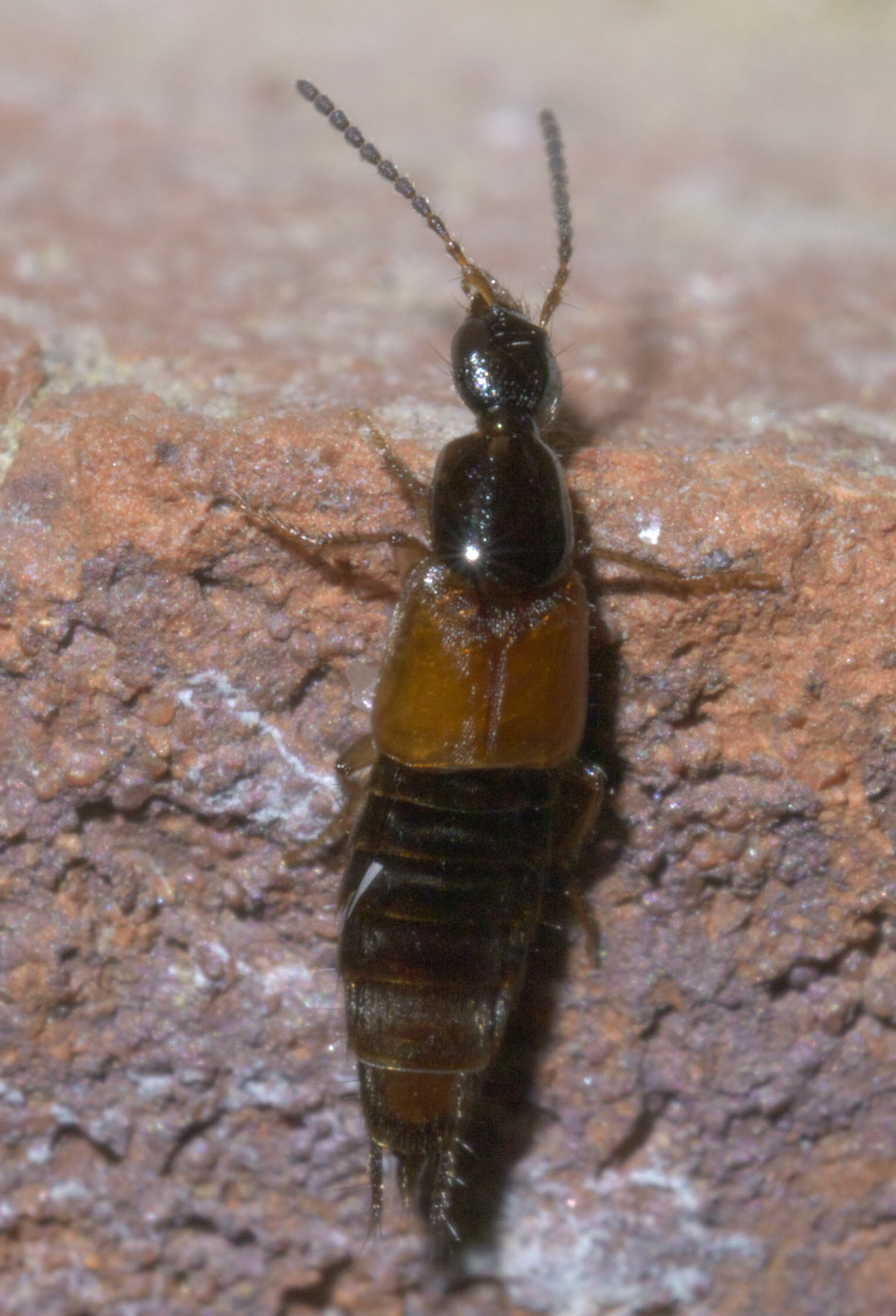

== See also ==
- List of Philonthus species
