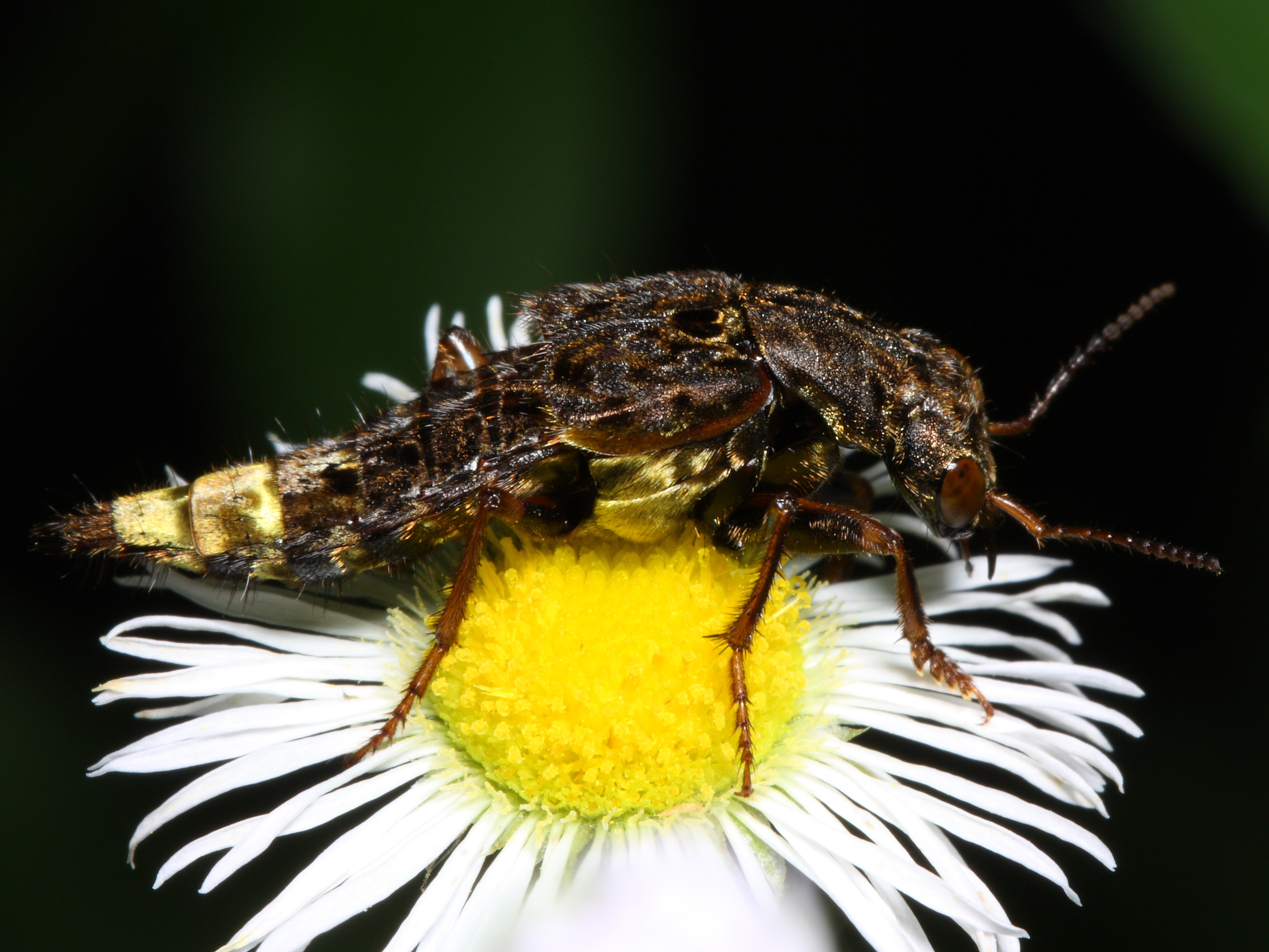
- Ontholestes cingulatus.

Scientific classification
- Kingdom: Animalia
- Phylum: Arthropoda
- Clade: Pancrustacea
- Class: Insecta
- Order: Coleoptera
- Suborder: Polyphaga
- Infraorder: Staphyliniformia
- Family: Staphylinidae
- Subfamily: Staphylininae; Latreille, 1802

Diversity
- 6 tribes

Synonyms
- Staphylinae (lapsus)

= Staphylininae =

Staphylininae Temporal range: Lutetian–Recent

Subfamily of beetles

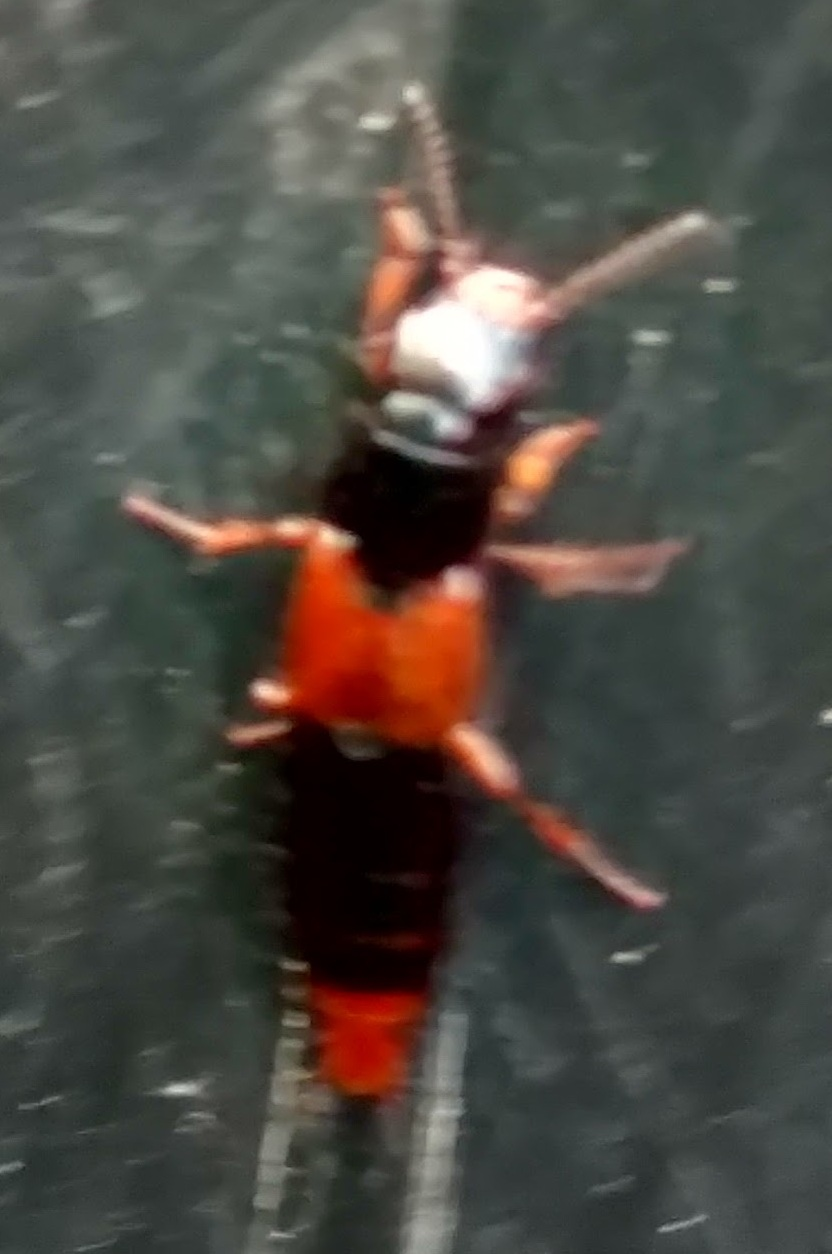
Platydracus cinnamopterus in SW Pennsylvania

Staphylininae are a subfamily of rove beetles (family Staphylinidae). They contain the typical rove beetles with their long but fairly robust blunt-headed and -tipped bodies and short elytra, as well as some more unusually-shaped lineages.

== Systematics ==
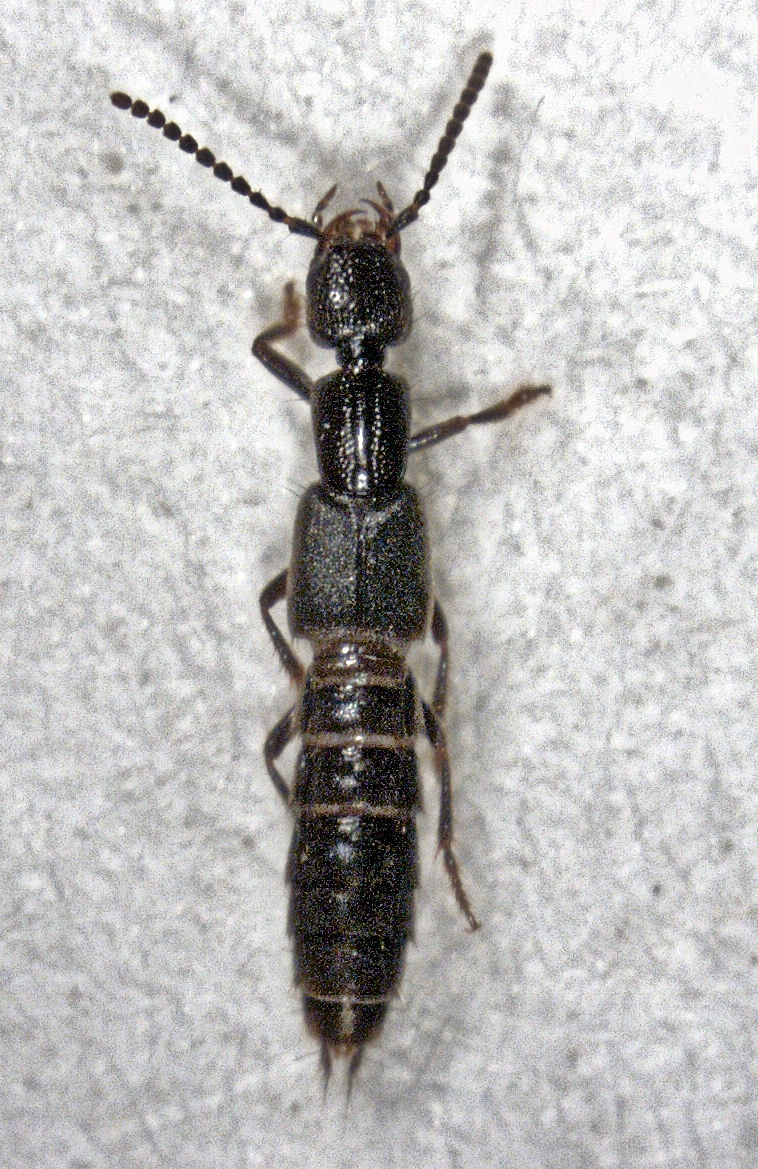
Cafius algophilus (Staphylinini)

As it seems, the Staphylininae are part of a large clade together with the subfamilies Euaesthetinae, Leptotyphlinae, Megalopsidiinae, Oxyporinae, Paederinae, Pseudopsinae, Scydmaeninae, Solieriinae, Steninae, and the extinct Protactinae which are only known from fossils.

The numerous Staphylininae genera are divided into six tribes, listed below along with some notable genera. However, a scientific study in 2020 proposed moving all tribes except Staphylinini to other subfamilies and raising several of Staphylinini's subtribes to tribal level. This would result in a new total of twelve tribes: Acylophorini, Afroquediini, Amblyopinini, Antimerini, †Baltognathini, Cyrtoquediini, Erichsoniini, Hyptiomini, Indoquediini, Quediini, Staphylinini and Tanygnathinini.

- Coomaniini Żyła & Solodovnikov, 2019
  - Coomania Cameron, 1939
- Diochini Casey, 1906
  - Antarctothius Coiffait & Saiz
  - Diochus Erichson, 1839
    - †Diochus electrus Chatzimanolis & Engel, 2011 (Lutetian, Baltic amber)
- Maorothiini
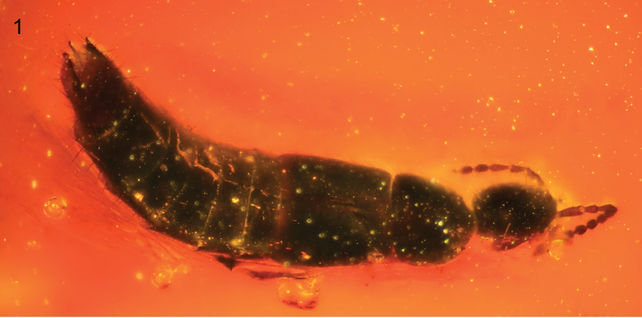
  Diochus electrus
- Othiini C.G.Thomson, 1859
- Platyprosopini Lynch, 1884
- Staphylinini Latreille, 1802 (including Philonthini, Tanygnathinini)
  - Cafius
  - Creophilus
    - Creophilus maxillosus – hairy rove beetle
  - Eucibdelus
  - Euryporus Erichson, 1839
  - Flohria
  - Gabrius
  - Indoquedius
  - Jurecekia
  - Ocypus
    - Ocypus olens – devil's coach-horse beetle
    - Ocypus ophthalmicus
  - Ontholestes
  - Paederomimus
  - Philonthus
    - Philonthus cognatus
  - Quedius
    - Quedius curtipennis
    - Quedius fuliginosus
  - Rabigus Mulsant & Rey, 1876
  - Rhynchocheilus
  - Staphylinus
  - Stevensia
  - Thinopinus – pictured rove beetle
  - Velleius Leach, 1819
    - Velleius dilatatus (Fabricius, 1787)
- Xantholinini Erichson, 1839
  - Gyrohypnus Leach, 1819
  - Leptacinus Erichson, 1839
    - Leptacinus intermedius Donisthorpe, 1935
  - Xantholinus Erichson, 1839
