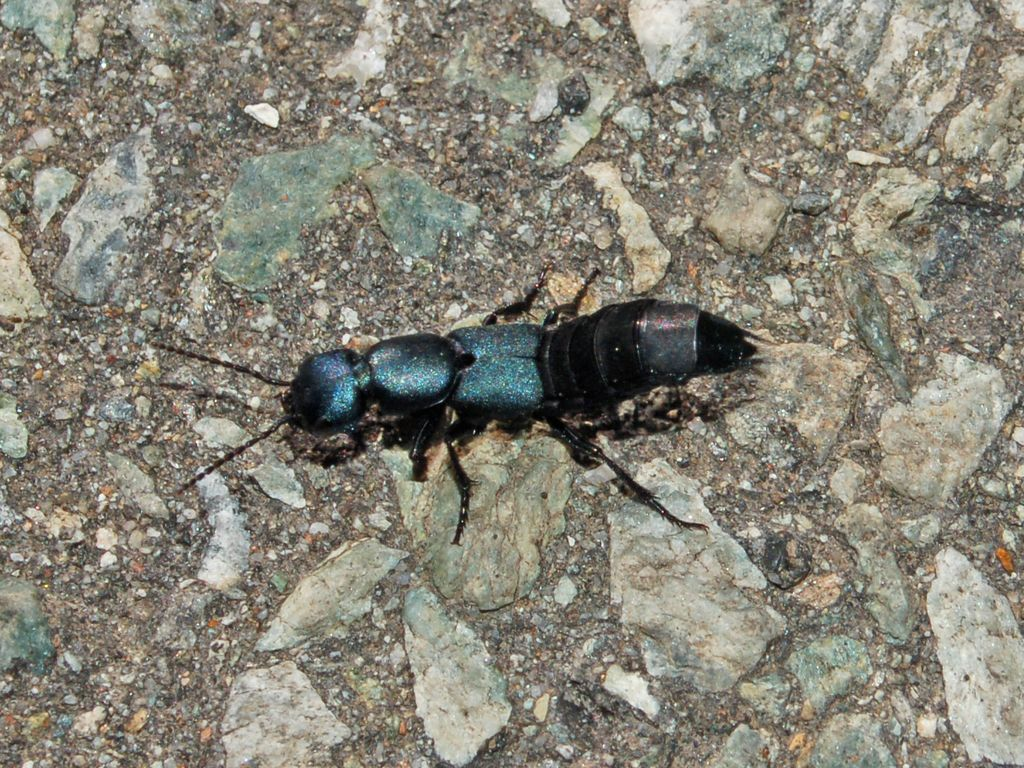
- Ocypus ophthalmicus

Scientific classification
- Kingdom: Animalia
- Phylum: Arthropoda
- Clade: Pancrustacea
- Class: Insecta
- Order: Coleoptera
- Suborder: Polyphaga
- Infraorder: Staphyliniformia
- Family: Staphylinidae
- Subfamily: Staphylininae
- Tribe: Staphylinini
- Subtribe: Staphylinina
- Genus: Ocypus; Leach, 1819

Species
- See text

Synonyms
- Goerius Westwood 1827; Isopterum Gistel 1856; Xanthocypus J. Muller 1925

= Ocypus =

Ocypus Temporal range: Chattian–Present

Genus of beetles

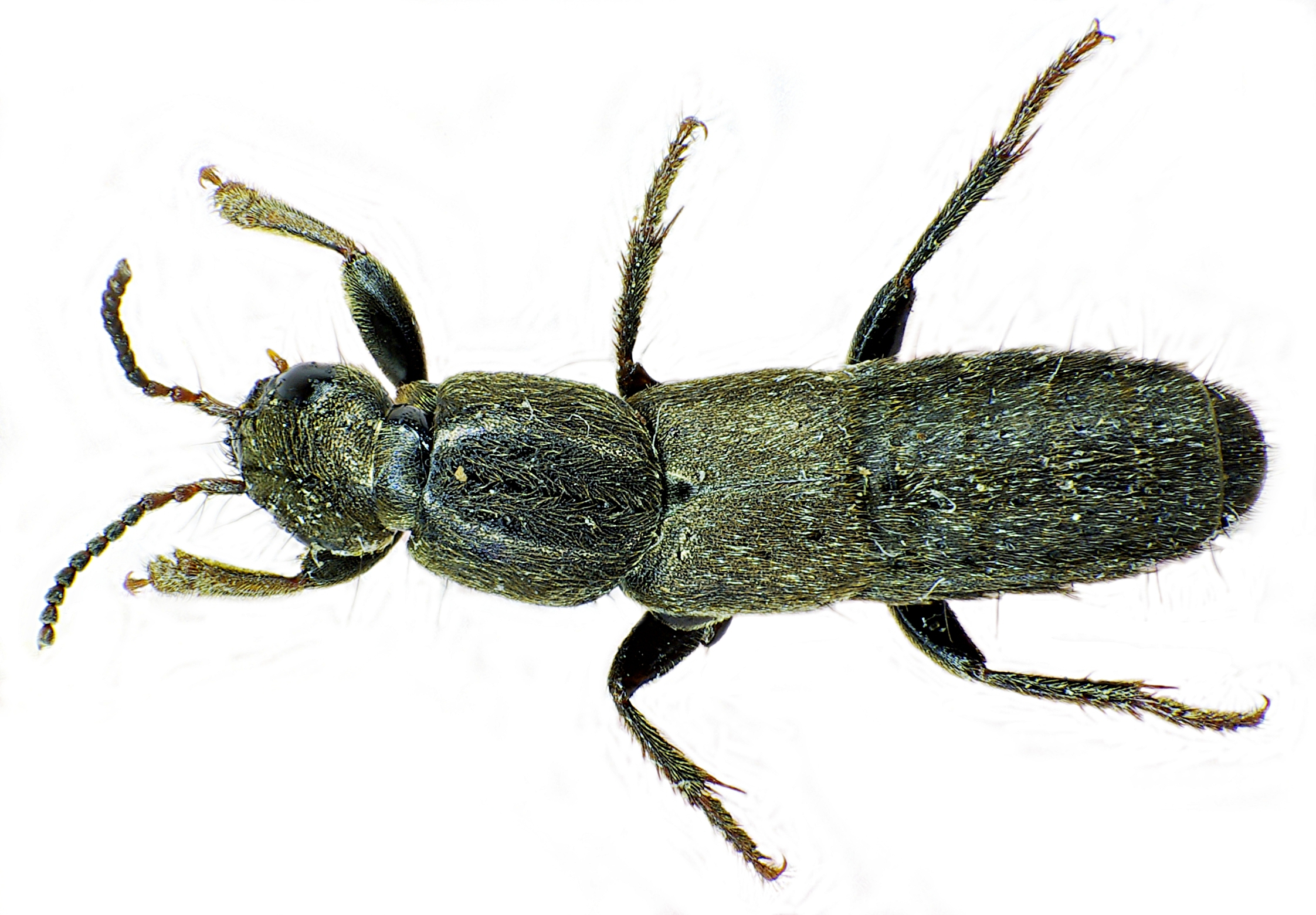
Ocypus aeneocephalus

Ocypus is a genus of rove beetles in the subfamily Staphylininae.

== Species ==
The following 176 are species of Ocypus:

- Ocypus abaris Smetana, 2007
- Ocypus aenescens Eppelsheim, 1889
- Ocypus aereus Cameron, 1928
- Ocypus aethiops (Waltl, 1835)
- Ocypus almensis Coiffait, 1967
- Ocypus altissimus Coiffait, 1977
- Ocypus affinis Wollaston, 1864
- Ocypus albanicus (Müller, G., 1943)
- Ocypus alfierii (Bernhauer, 1925)
- Ocypus alpicola Erichson, 1840
- Ocypus alpestris Erichson, 1840
- Ocypus alticulminis He, Liang & Hong-Zhang Zhou, 2017
- Ocypus ambiguus Coiffait, 1964
- Ocypus anguliculminis He, Liang & Hong-Zhang Zhou, 2017
- Ocypus angustulus Eppelsheim, 1888
- Ocypus anophthalmicus (Hernández & Aguiar, 1988)
- Ocypus apterus (Scheerpeltz, 1976)
- Ocypus atavides Newton, 2017
- Ocypus auroguttatus (Cameron, 1932)
- Ocypus aurosericans (Fairmaire, 1891)
- Ocypus ballio Smetana, 2007
- Ocypus baronii (Coiffait, 1982)
- Ocypus bernhaueri (Müller, G., 1925)
- Ocypus bhutanicus Coiffait, 1977
- Ocypus bicoloris Smetana, 2010
- Ocypus biharicus (Müller, G., 1926)
- Ocypus bion Smetana, 2007
- Ocypus brenskei Reitter, 1884
- Ocypus brevipennis (Heer, 1839)
- Ocypus brunnipes (Fabricius, 1781)
- Ocypus bureschi Coiffait, 1971
- Ocypus caelestis Smetana, 2008
- Ocypus caeruleoides (Scheerpeltz, 1976)
- Ocypus caerulescensides Newton, 2015
- Ocypus caeruleus (Cameron, 1932)
- Ocypus calamis Smetana, 2007
- Ocypus cameroni Smetana & Davies, 2000
- Ocypus canariensis Gemminger & Harold, 1868
- Ocypus cebuensis (Wendeler, 1923)
- Ocypus cerceticus Coiffait, 1964
- Ocypus chevrolatii Baudi di Selve, 1848
- Ocypus corcyranus Assing, 2018
- Ocypus coreanus (Müller, G., 1925)
- Ocypus curtipennis Motschulsky, 1849
- Ocypus cyaneopubens (Reitter, 1913)
- Ocypus cyclopus Peyron, 1858
- Ocypus densissimus (Bernhauer, 1933)
- Ocypus denticulminis He, Liang & Hong-Zhang Zhou, 2017
- Ocypus deuvei Coiffait, 1978
- Ocypus digiticulminis He, Liang & Hong-Zhang Zhou, 2017
- Ocypus dolon Smetana, 2007
- Ocypus dryas Smetana, 2007
- Ocypus duplicatus (Müller, G., 1943)
- Ocypus elpenor Smetana, 2007
- Ocypus excisus (Müller, G., 1950)
- Ocypus festae (Müller G., 1925)
- Ocypus forficularius (Motschulsky, 1860)
- Ocypus fortunatarum Wollaston, 1871
- Ocypus frater Smetana, 1965
- Ocypus fulvipennis Erichson, 1840
- Ocypus fuscatus (Gravenhorst, 1802)
- Ocypus fusciculminis He, Liang & Hong-Zhang Zhou, 2017
- Ocypus fuscoaeneus Solsky, 1871
- Ocypus glabrio Smetana, 2007
- Ocypus gorgias Smetana, 2007
- Ocypus graeseri Eppelsheim, 1887
- Ocypus harbinensis Li, Jingke, 1993
- Ocypus hecato Smetana, 2007
- Ocypus heinzi Smetana, 1965
- Ocypus helleni (Müller, G., 1926)
- Ocypus himalaycus (Coiffait, 1982)
- Ocypus hissaricus Dvořák, M., 1984
- Ocypus hochhuthi Eppelsheim, 1878
- Ocypus hyas Smetana, 2007
- Ocypus impennis (Fauvel, 1882)
- Ocypus imurai Smetana, 2005
- Ocypus inexpectatus Eppelsheim, 1887
- Ocypus italicus (Aragona, 1830)
- Ocypus itys Smetana, 2007
- Ocypus japonicus Sawada, K., 1965
- Ocypus jeannei Coiffait, 1980
- Ocypus jelineki Smetana, 2009
- Ocypus khnzoriani Coiffait, 1967
- Ocypus kuntzeni (Müller, G., 1926)
- Ocypus laelaps Smetana, 2007
- Ocypus latens Solodovnikov, 2000
- Ocypus lewisius Sharp, 1874
- Ocypus liaoningensis Li, Jingke, 1993
- Ocypus longimanus Smetana, 1965
- Ocypus macrocephalus (Gravenhorst, 1802)
- Ocypus manceps Smetana, 1965
- Ocypus mateui (Coiffait, 1954)
- Ocypus matilei Jarrige, 1971
- Ocypus megalocephalus (Nordmann, 1837)
- Ocypus menander Smetana, 2007
- Ocypus milleri Quedenfeldt, M., 1882
- Ocypus mimas Smetana, 2011
- Ocypus miwai (Bernhauer, 1943)
- Ocypus murgulensis Coiffait, 1978
- Ocypus mus (Brullé, 1832)
- Ocypus nabis Smetana, 2008
- Ocypus nabozhenkoi Khachikov, 2005
- Ocypus neobrevicornis Li, Jingke, 2015
- Ocypus neocles Smetana, 2007
- Ocypus nepalicus (Coiffait, 1981)
- Ocypus nigriculminis He, Liang & Hong-Zhang Zhou, 2017
- Ocypus nigroaeneus Sharp, 1889
- Ocypus nigror Smetana, 2008
- Ocypus nitens (Schrank, 1781)
- Ocypus nubigena Smetana, 1965
- Ocypus nudicollis Coiffait, 1977
- Ocypus obscuroaeneus Fairmaire, 1852
- Ocypus olens (O. Müller, 1764) - devil's coach-horse
- Ocypus ophthalmicus (Scopoli, 1763)
- Ocypus ormayi (Reitter, 1887)
- Ocypus orodes Smetana, 2007
- Ocypus ottomanus Fauvel, 1900
- Ocypus palamedes Smetana, 2007
- Ocypus pammenes Smetana, 2007
- Ocypus pecoudi (Jarrige, 1954)
- Ocypus pedemontanus (Müller, G., 1924)
- Ocypus pelias Smetana, 2007
- Ocypus picipennis (Fabricius, 1792)
- Ocypus pileaticulminis He, Liang & Hong-Zhang Zhou, 2017
- Ocypus ponomarevorum Khachikov, 2013
- Ocypus ponticus Smetana, 1968
- Ocypus primoriensis Smetana, 2008
- Ocypus provincialis (Oustalet, 1874)
- Ocypus puer (Smetana, 2005)
- Ocypus puetzi Smetana, 2011
- Ocypus pullus Hochhuth, 1849
- Ocypus quadraticeps (Ménétriés, 1832)
- Ocypus quadrimaculatus (Cameron, 1932)
- Ocypus queinneci Coiffait, 1984
- Ocypus quiris Smetana, 2007
- Ocypus recticulminis He, Liang & Hong-Zhang Zhou, 2017
- Ocypus reimoseri (Bernhauer, 1906)
- Ocypus rhaeticus Eppelsheim, 1873
- Ocypus rhinton Smetana, 2007
- Ocypus rhoetus Smetana, 2007
- Ocypus sadales Smetana, 2007
- Ocypus saevus Solodovnikov, 2000
- Ocypus sarpedon Smetana, 2007
- Ocypus scaevola Smetana, 2007
- Ocypus semenowi Reitter, 1887
- Ocypus sericeicollis (Ménétriés, 1832)
- Ocypus sericeomicans (Bernhauer, 1931)
- Ocypus serotinus (Ádám, 1992)
- Ocypus shiretokensis Hayashi, Y., 2008
- Ocypus sikkimensides Newton, 2015
- Ocypus sikkimensis (Bernhauer, 1920)
- Ocypus simulator Eppelsheim, 1878
- Ocypus solarii (Müller, G., 1923)
- Ocypus stastnyi Dvořák, M., 2000
- Ocypus subaenescens Wollaston, 1864
- Ocypus svetlanae Khachikov, 2020
- Ocypus svozili Dvořák, M., 1984
- Ocypus sylvaticus Wollaston, 1865
- Ocypus syriacus Baudi di Selve, 1848
- Ocypus tenebricosus (Gravenhorst, 1846)
- Ocypus testaceipes Fairmaire, 1887
- Ocypus teuthras Smetana, 2007
- Ocypus thericles Smetana, 2007
- Ocypus torvus Smetana, 1965
- Ocypus trapezensis Coiffait, 1964
- Ocypus turcicus (Bernhauer, 1923)
- Ocypus umbricola Wollaston, 1864
- Ocypus umbro Smetana, 2007
- Ocypus vindex Smetana, 2007
- Ocypus wasmanni (Bernhauer, 1920)
- Ocypus weisei Harold, 1877
- Ocypus xerxes Smetana, 2007
- Ocypus zetes Smetana, 2007
- Ocypus zetes Smetana, 2007
- Ocypus zopyrus Smetana, 2007

== Sources ==
- Biolib
- Fauna Europaea
