= David Sharp (entomologist) =

English entomologist (1840-1922)

David Sharp FRS FLS FZS
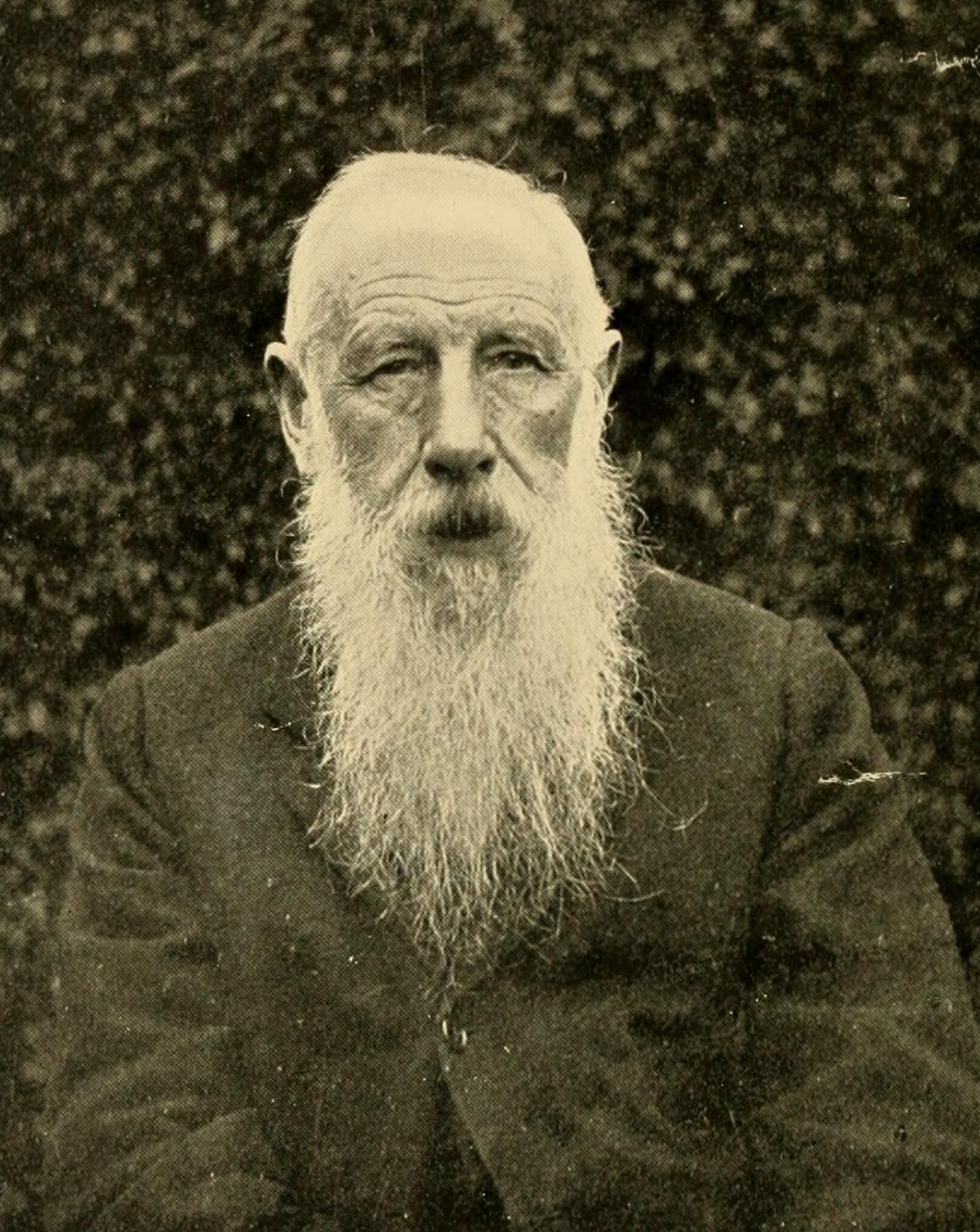
- Sharp in 1922
- Born: 18 October 1840; Towcester, England, British Empire
- Died: 27 August 1922 (aged 81)
- Education: University of Edinburgh (BA)
- Scientific career
- Fields: Entomology

David Sharp FRS FLS FZS (18 October 1840 – 27 August 1922) was an English physician and entomologist who worked mainly on beetles. He was among the most prolific publishers in the history of entomology with more than 250 papers that included seven major revisions and reviews and a highly influential work on the structure and modifications of the male genital structures of beetles. He edited The Zoological Record for three decades.

== Biography ==
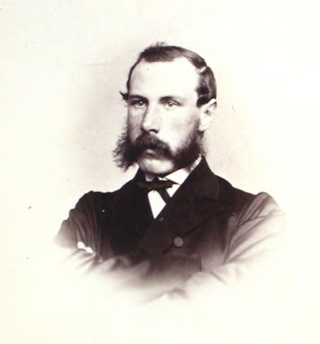
Sharp in 1869

David Sharp was born at Towcester and lived his early years in Stony Stratford. Some twelve years later his parents moved to London, where he received most of his education. After attending one or two preparatory schools, in 1853 he entered St. John's Foundation School which was then at Kilburn. At the age of seventeen he commenced to help his father, a leather merchant, and about the same time he began collecting beetles, some of his favourite haunts being Ken Wood and Hammersmith Marshes, as well as the sandy shores about Deal and Dover. Lacking an interest in business life, he choose to pursue a career in medicine. He accordingly, after studying for two years at St. Bartholomew's Hospital, went to the University of Edinburgh, where he obtained the degree of Bachelor of Medicine in 1866. After graduation he assisted a friend with his practice in London for a year or two. He had at first some thought of seeking an appointment in connection with entomology at the British Museum, but abandoned the idea; and about ten years later he went so far as to apply for the post of Curator of the City of Glasgow Industrial Museum, being recommended by H.W. Bates and Frederick Smith amongst others. After his short residence in London he was offered a post as medical officer in the Crichton Asylum at Dumfries, which led to his taking charge of a case at Thornhill in the neighbourhood, where he joined the Dumfriesshire and Galloway Scientific, Natural History, and Antiquarian Society upon its reconstruction in 1876. This engagement gave him the leisure he desired for prosecuting the studies on which his heart was set, and it was during this period that he published some of his earlier papers. It was also here that his marriage took place. In 1883, upon the death of a wealthy patient, William Cunninghame Graham Bontine (1825-1883), to whom he served as a special medical attendant, he returned to England. Bontine had been injured on the head by an Irishman during the Irish famine. The injury led to serious mental issues and the patient was declared "insane" and admitted to the Crichton Royal Institution. Sharp initially went to live at Southampton, but, finding it too far from London, after about two years he removed to Dartford. In 1885 he was invited to go to Cambridge as Curator of the Cambridge University Museum of Zoology. There he spent the next nineteen years of his life, till in 1909, when he retired to Brockenhurst, where he had built a residence, Lawnside, on the very edge of the New Forest, facing the extensive heath of Black Knowl where he resided till his death on 27 August 1922.

== Positions held ==
In 1862, Sharp became a fellow of the Entomological Society of London and he was its president in 1887 and 1888, his presidential address being at the end of the former year on the subject of entomological collections, and of the latter on the senses of insects with special reference to that of sight. Between 1889 and 1903 he was on several occasions a vice-president, and he was on the Council from 1893 to 1895 and from 1902 to 1904. While living in London he was Secretary to the Society during 1867. In 1886, he became a Fellow of the Zoological Society, and he was on the Council from 1901 to 1905. The Linnean Society is also able to claim him as a Fellow since 1888; and he was connected by membership or correspondence with the chief entomological societies throughout the world. The high distinction of being elected a Fellow of the Royal Society fell to his lot in 1890, and the next year the University of Cambridge conferred on him the degree of Master of Arts, honoris causa.

== Publications ==
Sharp was the author of more than 250 papers and larger works. Being connected with the Entomologist's Monthly Magazine and the Entomologist, in either an editorial or a reference capacity, many of his numerous shorter papers appear in these magazines. Yet others, as well as some of his more pretentious papers, will be found in the transactions of societies with which he was connected. His earliest contribution to entomological literature was a paper on the British species of Agathidium (Coleoptera) read before the Entomological Society of London on 6 November 1865. A discussion on heredity and kindred subjects between him and Wallace, arising in connection with Westwood's introduction of the mimicry subject at the Entomological Society of London in November 1866, was reported in the Athenaeum of 1, 8, and 15 December 1866.

A Revision of the British Species of Homalota (Coleoptera) was published by the Entomological Society of London soon after his graduation at Edinburgh. In November 1873 appeared a paper in Spanish – Especies nuevas de Coleópteros por Don David Sharp. This refers to insects collected by his friend G.R. Crotch, whose obituary notice Sharp contributed to volume 11 of the Entomologists' Monthly Magazine. The Object and Method of Zoological Nomenclature appeared in November 1873.

A short paper on the Coleoptera of the Scotch Fir came out in the Scottish Naturalist about this time. The Dascillidae of New Zealand was published in the Annals and Magazine of Natural History in July 1878; while work on water beetles was taken for publication by the Royal Society of Dublin. Sharp and Fowler's Catalogue of the British Coleoptera appeared in 1893; the Rhynchophorous Coleoptera of Japan in 1896; the articles Insecta and Termites in the Encyclopædia Britannica in 1902; and an article on the Orders of Insects, a subject in which Sharp was much interested, in the Entomologist for 1909. The Distribution of Plants and Animals on the Globe (a paper read before the Dumfries Nat. Hist. Society in 1883); Stridulation in Ants, 1893; an Account of the Phasmidae, 1898; and the Grouse-fly, 1907, are away from Coleoptera, and A Scheme for a National System of Rest-Funds (or Pensions) for Working People (1892) shows that he could detach himself from entomology altogether.

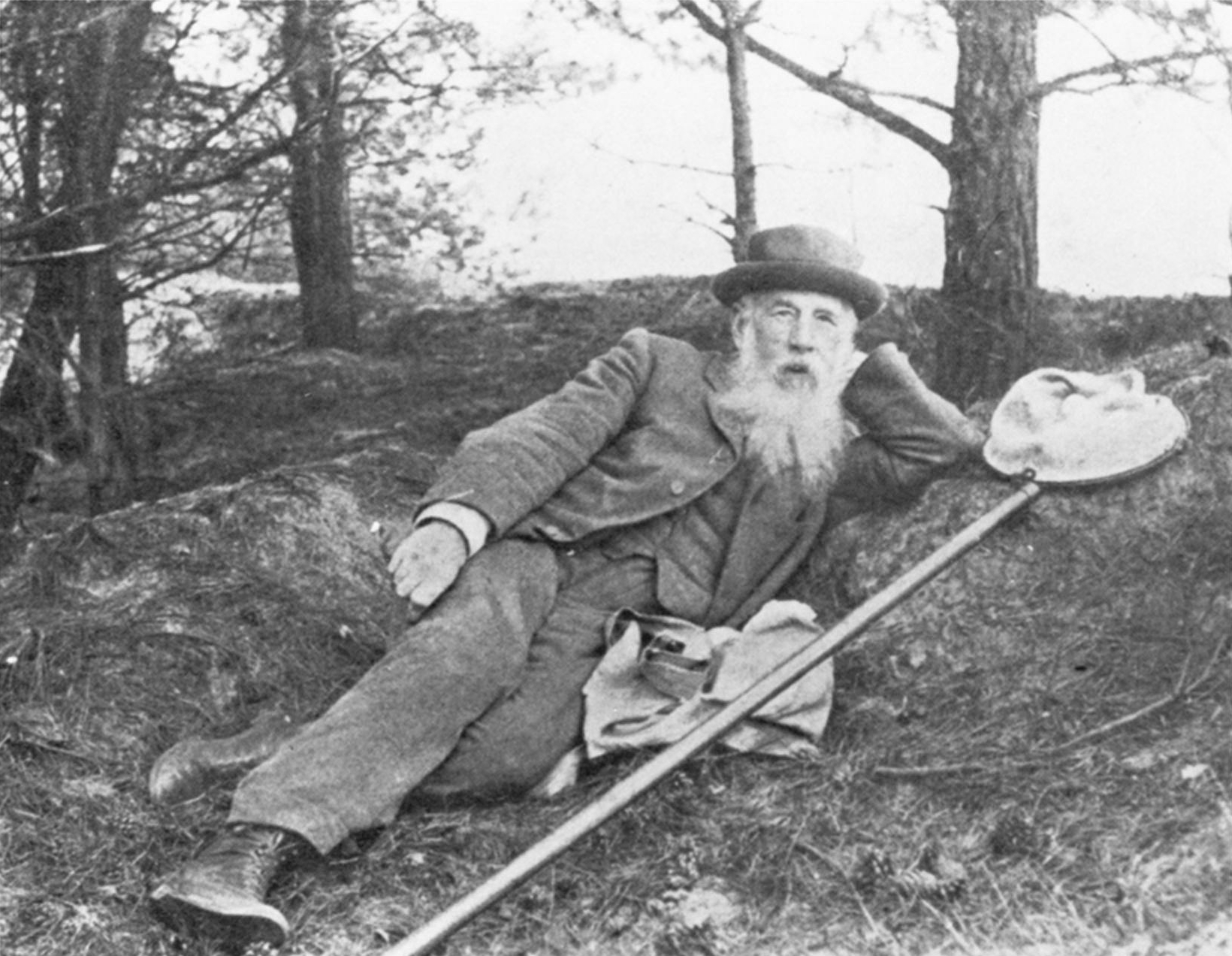
Sharp in 1909

Sharp's major papers included those on the Coleoptera of the Hawaiian Islands published by the Entomological Society of London in 1878, 1879 and 1880. These were followed in 1899 and 1908 by the Fauna Hawaiiensis brought out by the Royal Society. This was followed by his work on the Beetles of Central America, prepared chiefly from material collected by Frederick DuCane Godman and Osbert Salvin, and published in 1894 and later years in that monumental work known as the "Fauna Centrali-Americana".

In 1895 appeared the first volume of the Insecta in the Cambridge Natural History, followed by the second volume in 1899. Its popularity prevented Sharp for producing a new edition incorporating improvements in the classification of the insects. He published on the topic in the Entomologist. In 1910 the Insecta was translated into Russian by N. Y. Kuznetsov. In 1912 the Entomological Society of London, with the assistance of the Royal Society, brought out as Part III of the Transactions The Comparative Anatomy of the Male Genital Tube in Coleoptera by Frederick Arthur Godfrey Muir, an exhaustive treatise of 166 pages and 37 plates. All the beetle families were examined, and the results of numerous dissections are included.

Among Sharp's most impressive works are the annual volumes of The Zoological Record, published by the Zoological Society. These are lists of the publications for each year in all branches of zoology, British and foreign, classified under the headings of author and subject. He was editor for the whole and recorder also for insects. This continued into his final illness, in which he read the final proofs of 1920's records.

== Personal life ==
Sharp knew most of the British naturalists of his time – Huxley, Bates, Wallace, Buchanan White, etc. He was a great friend of Spencer, and in 1904 wrote an article in the Zoologist, entitled The Place of Herbert Spencer in Biology, having particular reference to him in connection with the teachings of Charles Darwin.

At around the age of seventeen or eighteen – Sharp went with his father to Switzerland, and greatly enjoyed the trip. In later life he went to stay with Oberthur in France. The loss of his friend G.R. Crotch, Librarian to the University of Cambridge, was a great blow to him. They had been closely associated in entomological work, and had made several excursions together – to the New Forest, to Rannoch, and to Spain. Sharp often spoke of the primitive conditions in years gone by to be found in the New Forest and in Scotland, and told amusing stories of their difficulties in the way of procuring food and lodgings. With another friend, Bishop, he visited Sherwood Forest, and the last letter he wrote during his illness was to this friend, who died only so recently as 26 August last.

In Brockenhurst Sharp, worked assiduously with one of his daughters, Margaret Annie Sharp (who later married Frederick Arthur Godfrey Muir) in his entomological laboratory, elucidating the life-story or the anatomy of numerous insects, chiefly Coleoptera. His beetle collection went to his daughter, Mrs Margaret Annie Muir.

Sharp's extensive collection, including several thousand type specimens, is housed at the Natural History Museum, London. His library was purchased by the Cawthron Institute at Nelson, New Zealand.

== Principal publications ==
- 1869 A revision of the British species of Homalota. Transactions of the Entomological Society of London, 1869(2–3), 91–272.
- 1874 The Staphylinidae of Japan. Transactions of the Entomological Society of London 1874: 1–103. See also 1888
- 1876 Contributions to an insect fauna of the Amazon Valley. Transactions of the Entomological Society of London 1876: 27–424.
- 1880–1882 Monograph on Aquatic Carnivorous Coleoptera or Dytiscidae Scientific Transactions of the Royal Dublin Society 2: 1–800.
- 1888 The Staphylinidae of Japan. The Annals and Magazine of Natural History, (6)2,. 277–477. 1876
- 1882– 1886 (1882–1886) Staphylinidae. pp. 145–824. In: 1882–1887. Biologia Centrali-Americana. Insecta. Coleoptera. 1(2). London: Taylor & Francis, xvi+824 pp., 19 plates.
- 1887 Pselaphidae. pp. 1–46. In: 1887–1905. Biologia Centrali-Americana. Insecta. Coleoptera. 2(1). London: Taylor & Francis, xii+717 pp., 19 plates.
- 1891 Synteliidae. In: Biologia Centrali-Americana. Coleoptera, Insecta. Coleoptera. 2(1). London: Taylor & Francis. 438–440.
- 1896 – 1913 With Robert Cyril Layton Perkins and Alfred Newton Fauna Hawaiiensis.
- 1899 Some points in the classification of the Insecta Hexapoda, Proc. 4th Int. Congr. Zool., pp. 246–249
- 1912 with Frederick Arthur Godfrey Muir. The comparative anatomy of the male genital tube in Coleoptera. Transactions of the Entomological Society of London. III: 477-462, 36pls. p. 523, pl. 60, figs. 107–109, male genitalia.

Sharp also contributed to two catalogues of British Coleoptera (with Oliver Erichson Janson, in 1871, and with William Weekes Fowler, in 1893).
