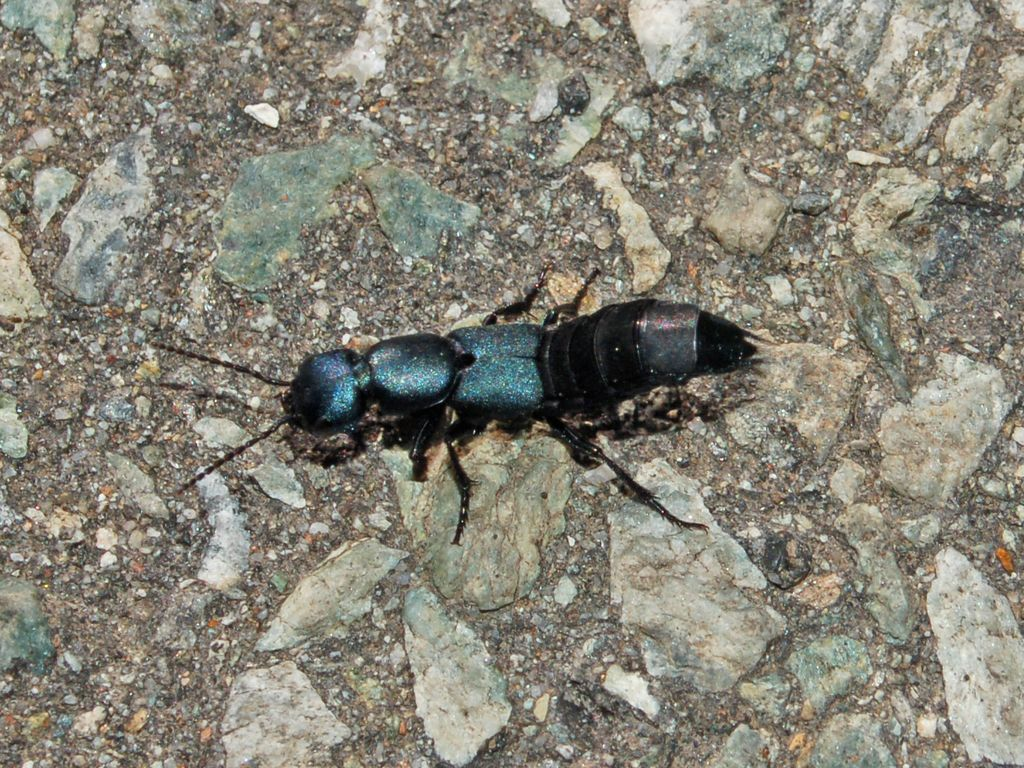

Scientific classification
- Kingdom: Animalia
- Phylum: Arthropoda
- Clade: Pancrustacea
- Class: Insecta
- Order: Coleoptera
- Suborder: Polyphaga
- Infraorder: Staphyliniformia
- Family: Staphylinidae
- Genus: Ocypus
- Species: O. ophthalmicus

Binomial name
- Ocypus ophthalmicus (Scopoli, 1763)

Synonyms
- Ocypus baicalensis Eppelsheim, 1887; Ocypus cyanochloris Hochhuth, 1849; Staphylinus atrocoerulescens Goeze, 1777; Staphylinus azurescens Mannerheim, 1830; Staphylinus balcanicus J. Müller, 1923; Staphylinus coerulescens Goeffroy, 1785; Staphylinus cyaneus Paykull, 1789; Staphylinus hypsibatus Bernhauer, 1899; Staphylinus mordax Block, 1799; Staphylinus ophthalmicus Scopoli, 1763

= Ocypus ophthalmicus =

Species of beetle

Ocypus ophthalmicus is a species of rove beetle belonging to the family Staphylinidae, subfamily Staphylininae.

These beetles are present in most of Europe, in the eastern Palearctic realm, in North Africa, and in the Near East.

Its head, pronotum, and elytra have metallic blue reflections, with a shiny surface of pronotum.

The adults grow up to 17–22 mm (0.67–0.87 in) long. O. ophthalmicus is a eurytopic species and can be encountered both in deciduous forests (Quercus spp., Fagus spp.) and in xeric habitats. Generally, they are found in detritus, under stones, and on dung. They are nocturnal predators (especially of worms, snails, larvae, etc.).

They are known for their habit of raising their long abdomens and opening their jaws, like a threatened scorpion. In this defense posture, they secrete an irritating substance, with a very unpleasant smell.

== Subspecies ==
- Ocypus ophthalmicus var. atrocyaneus Fairmaire, 1860
- Ocypus ophthalmicus var. balearicus (J. Müller, 1926)
- Ocypus ophthalmicus var. benoiti Drugmand, 1998
- Ocypus ophthalmicus var. brigitteae Drugmand, 1998
- Ocypus ophthalmicus var. ophthalmicus (Scopoli, 1763)
- Ocypus ophthalmicus var. rodopensis Coiffait, 1971
