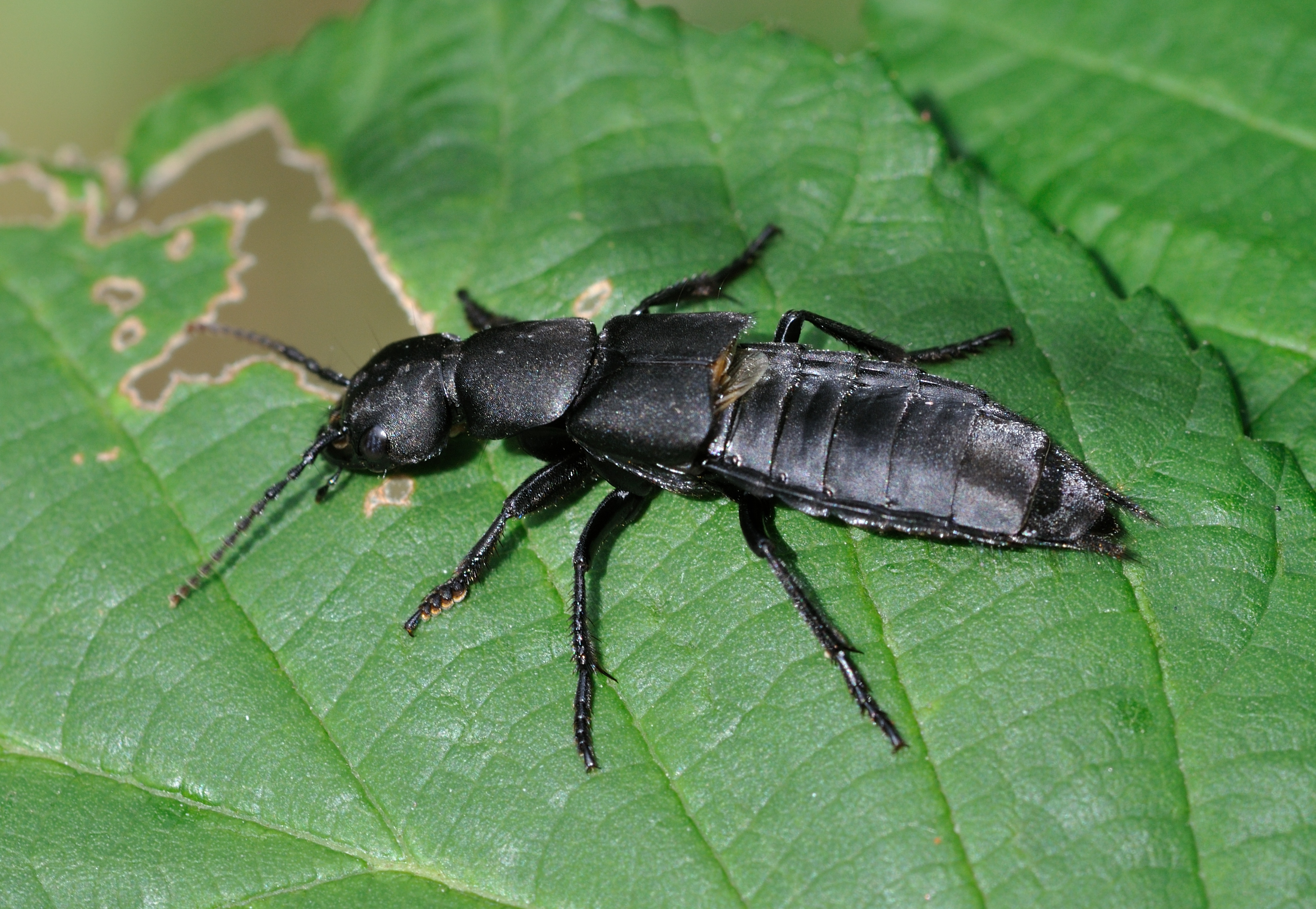
- An adult Ocypus olens

Scientific classification
- Kingdom: Animalia
- Phylum: Arthropoda
- Class: Insecta
- Order: Coleoptera
- Suborder: Polyphaga
- Infraorder: Staphyliniformia
- Family: Staphylinidae
- Genus: Ocypus
- Species: O. olens

Binomial name
- Ocypus olens (O. F. Müller, 1764)

Synonyms
- Staphylinus olens O. F. Müller, 1764; Goerius macrocephalus Stephens, 1832; Ocypus fulvopilosus Fiori, 1894; Ocypus meridionalis Fiori, 1894; Staphylinus major De Geer, 1774; Staphylinus unicolor Herbst, 1784

= Devil's coach horse beetle =

Devil's coach-horse beetle

Species of beetle

The devil's coach-horse beetle (Ocypus olens) is a species of beetle belonging to the large family of the rove beetles (Staphylinidae). It was originally included in the genus Staphylinus in 1764, and some authors and biologists still use this classification.

== Etymology ==
The Latin species name olens, meaning "smelling", refers to the two white stinking glands on the abdomen. This beetle has been associated with the Devil since the Middle Ages, hence its common name, which has been used at least since 1840. Other names include devil's footman, devil's coachman, and devil's steed. It is sometimes also known as the cock-tail beetle for its habit of raising its abdomen.

One dictionary suggested that the name developed in parallelism with ladybird and its Norse cognates. In Irish, the beetle is called dearga-daol or darbh-daol. The Irish also called it "the coffin cutter." British folklore has it that a beetle has eaten the core of Eve's apple, and that a person who crushes such a beetle is forgiven seven sins.

== Subspecies ==
Subspecies within this species include:

- O. o. azoricus (Méquignon, 1942)
- O. o. olens (O. Müller, 1764)

== Distribution and habitat ==
These very common and widespread beetles are present in most of Europe and in North Africa. They have also been introduced to parts of the United States and Canada, specifically Oregon, Washington, California, and parts of British Columbia. They prefer areas with damp conditions and can be found from April to October in meadows, heath and moorland, woodlands, hedgerows, and parks and gardens. During the day, they commonly stay under logs, stones, or leaf litter.

== Description ==
O. olens preying on a moth (Cymbalophora pudica)

It is a long-bodied, black beetle. At about 20–32 mm (13/16–1 1/4 in), it is one of the larger European beetles. Its wing covers (elytra) are short, covering only its thorax, exposing the abdominal segments. The abdominal musculature is powerful and the abdominal segments are covered with sclerotized plates. It is capable of flight, but its wings are rarely used. It is covered with fine, black hairs. It is well known for its habit of raising its long and uncovered abdomen and opening its jaws, rather like a scorpion when threatened. Although it has no sting, it can give a painful bite with its strong, pincer-like jaws. It emits a foul-smelling odour, as a defensive secretion, from a pair of white glands at the end of its abdomen.

== Biology and diet ==
It is a predator, hunting mainly by night, feeding on a range of invertebrates, including worms, slugs, spiders, and woodlice, as well as carrion. The prey is caught in the mandibles, which are also used to cut and together with the front legs to manipulate the food into a bolus. The bolus is repeatedly chewed and swallowed, emerging covered with a brown secretion from the foregut, until it is reduced to a liquid that is digested. Skin in the case of earthworms and hard materials from arthropods are left. The larvae are carnivorous with similar eating habits.

== Reproduction ==
O. olens mates in autumn. Females lay their eggs from 2–3 weeks after first mating. They are large (4 mm or 3/16 in) and white with a darker band and laid singly in damp conditions under moss, stones, cow manure, or leaf litter. After around 30 days, the eggs split and the larvae emerge, white with a straw-coloured head. The larva lives largely underground, and feeds on similar prey to the adult and has the same well-developed mandibles. It adopts the same display with open jaws and raised tail when threatened.

The larva goes through three stages of growth (instars), the final stage ranging from 20 to 26 mm in length. Around 150 days old, the larva pupates for about 35 days and emerges as an adult with its final colouring, fully formed except for the wings, which cannot be folded neatly beneath the elytra for several hours. Adults can survive a second winter, some by hibernating in burrows and not emerging until March, while others remain active.

== Gallery ==
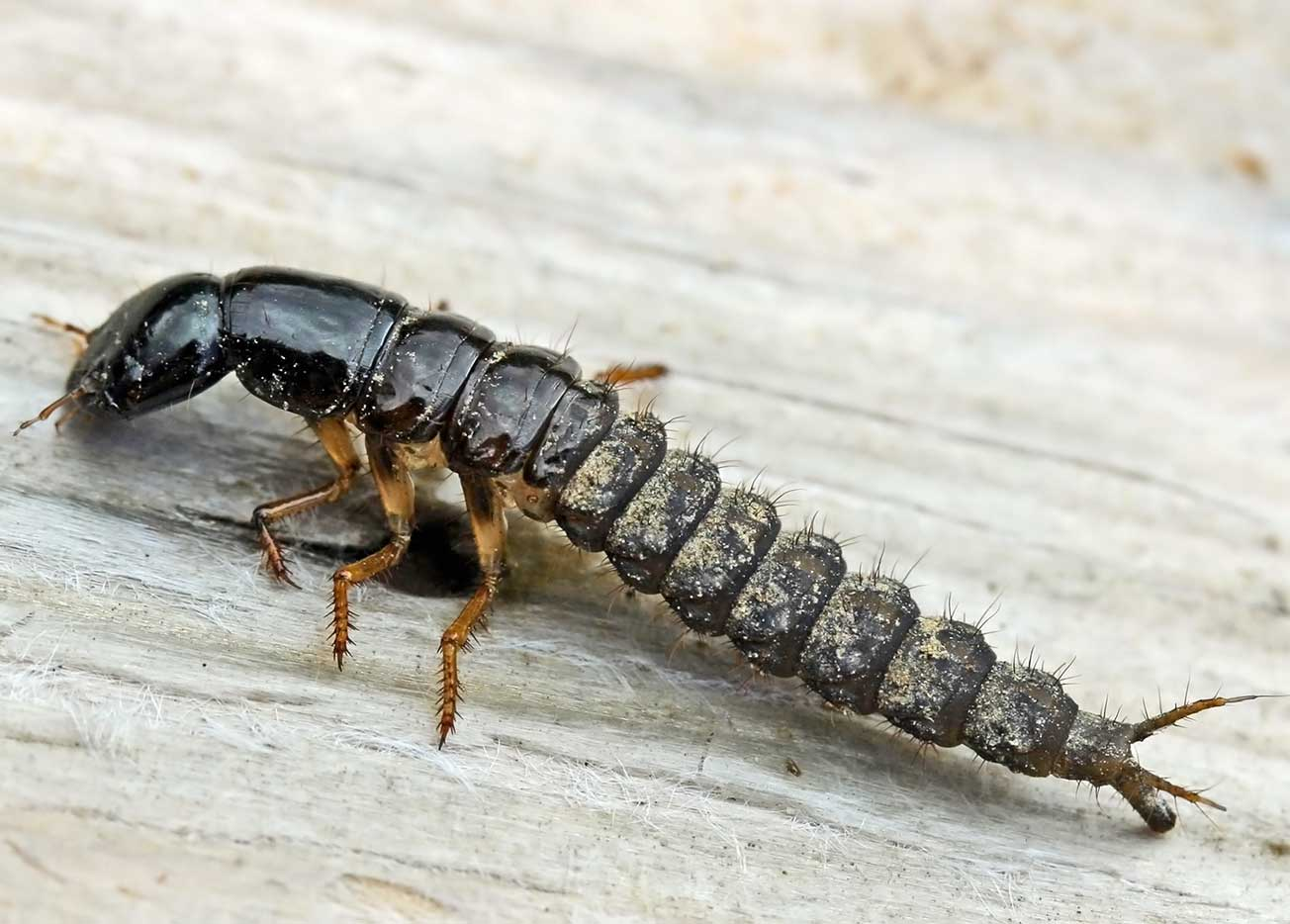
Larva

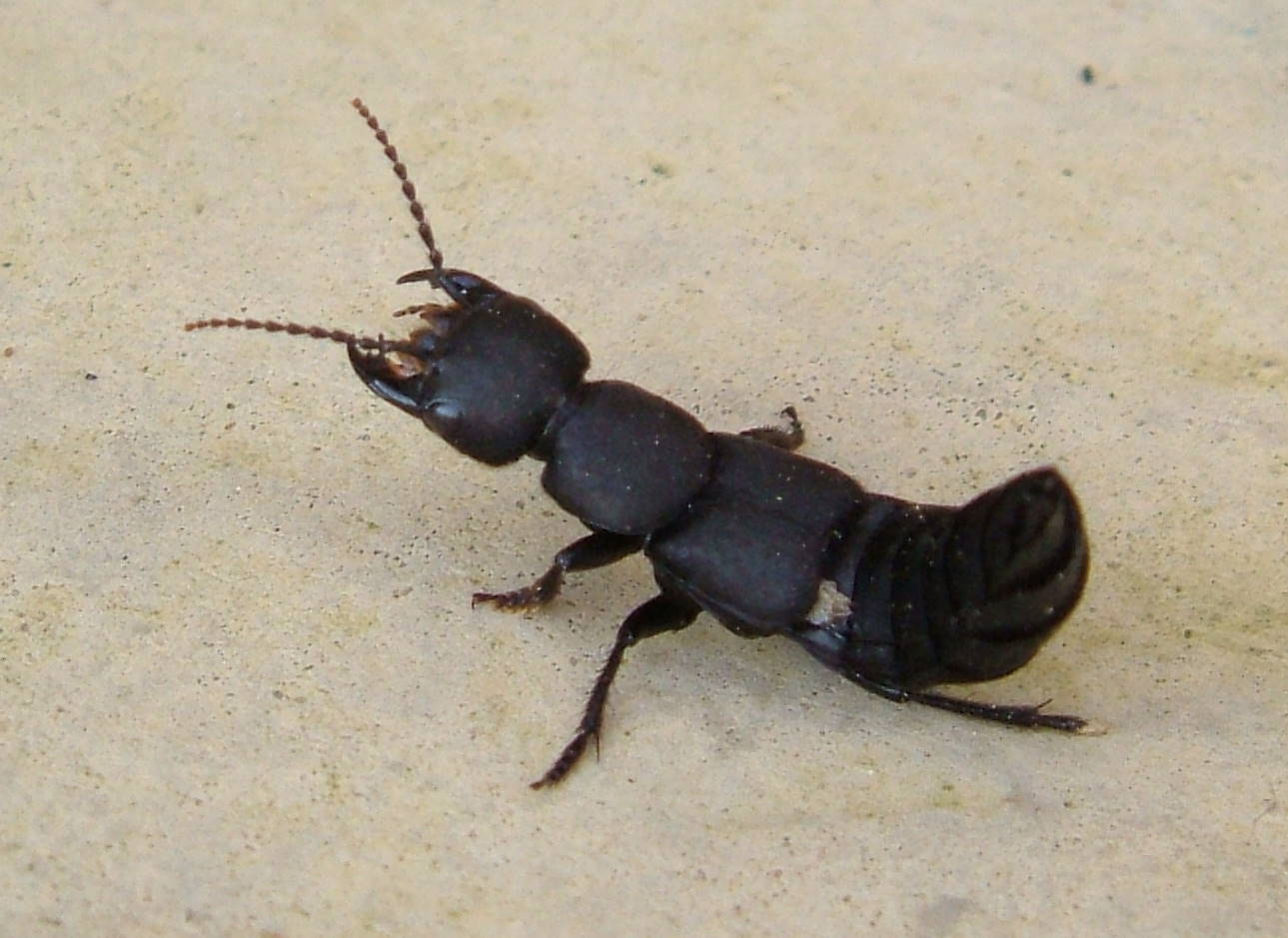
Threat display

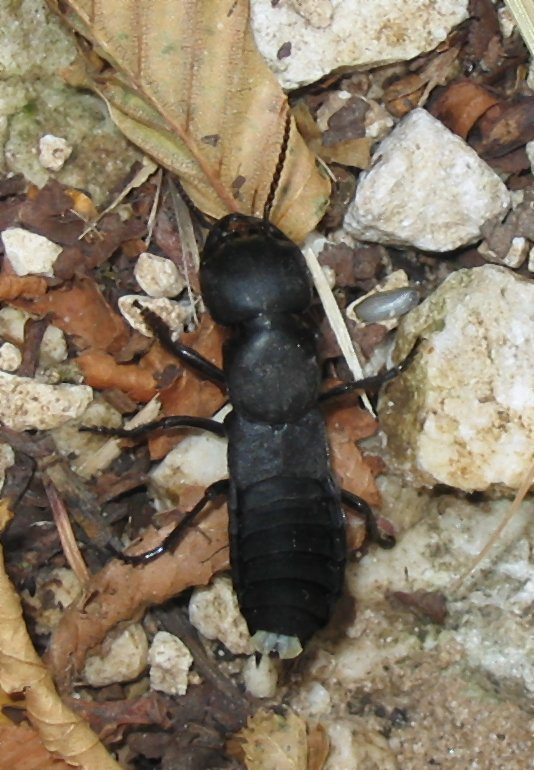
An adult showing the glands that emit a terrible smell.

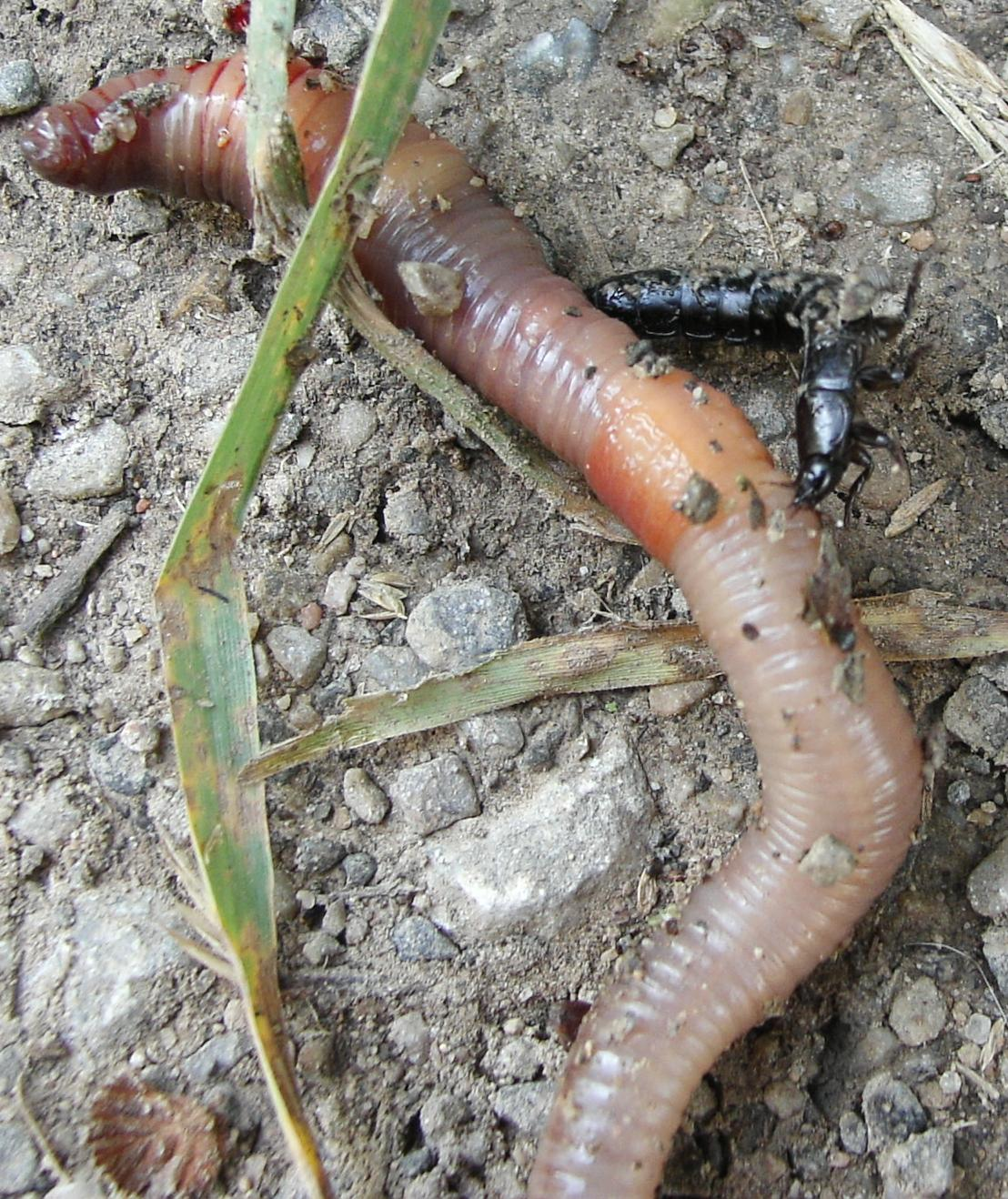
An adult attacking an earthworm

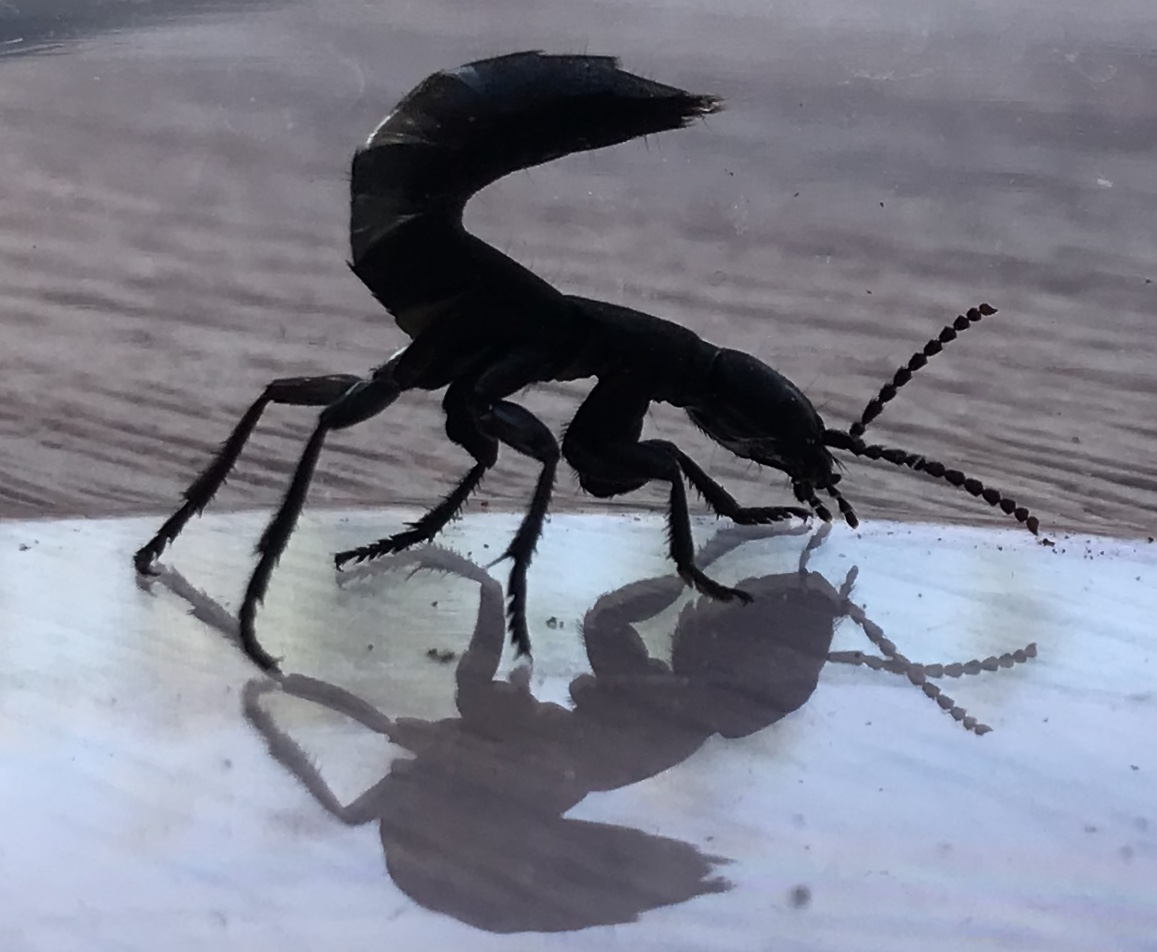
Threat display

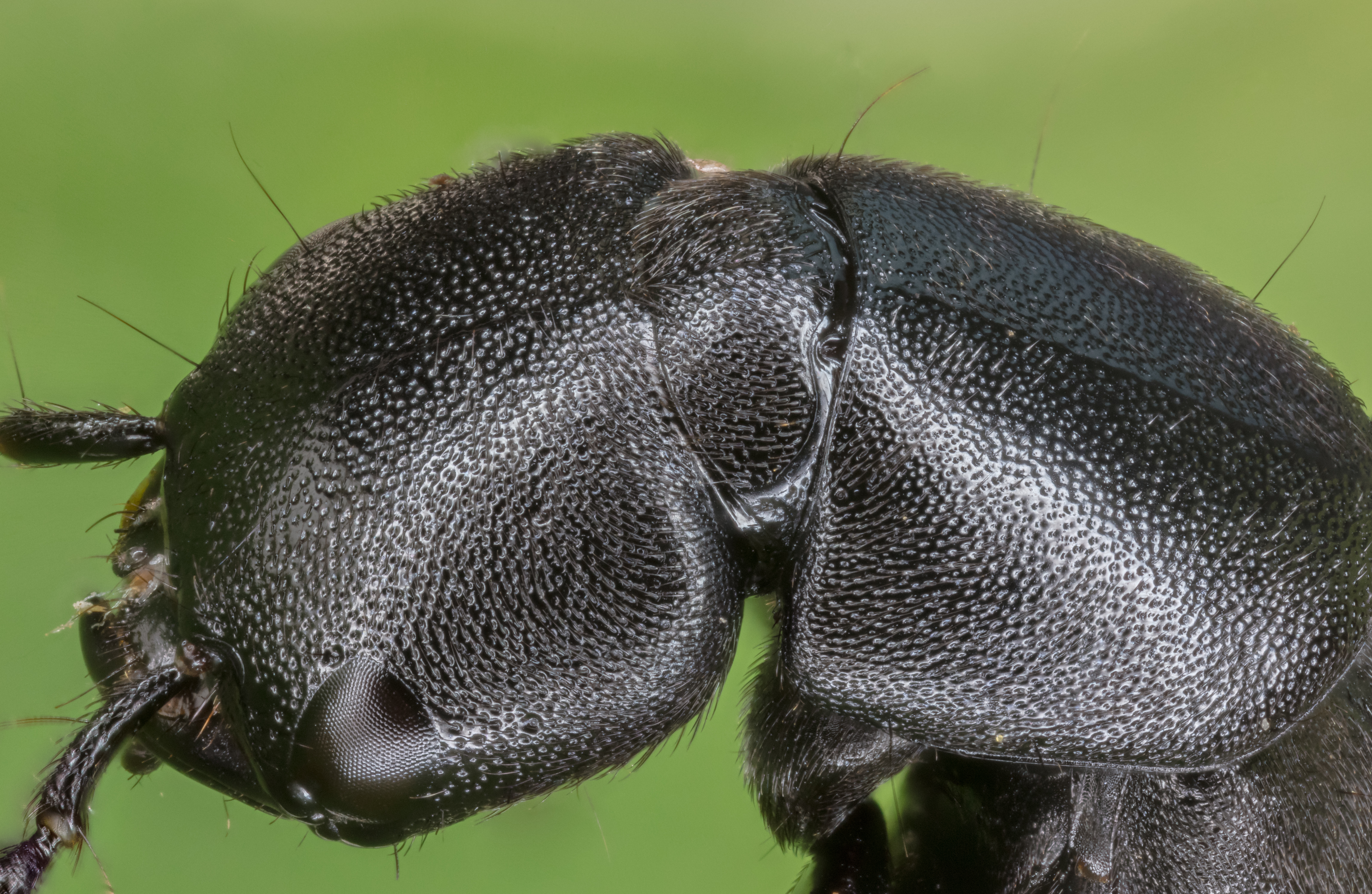
Detail, lateral view

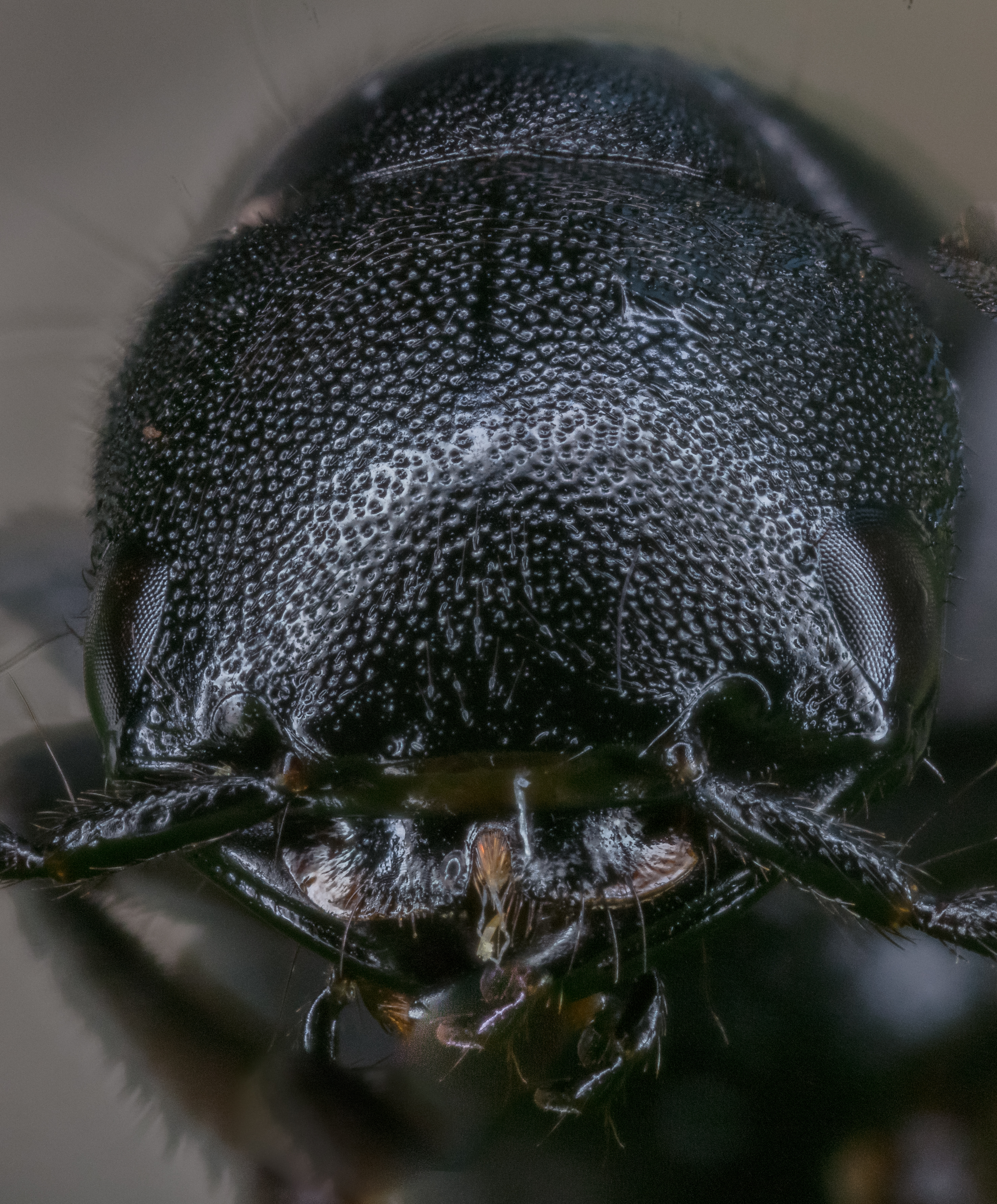
Detail, front view
