= Sphaerites politus =

Scientific classification
- Kingdom: Animalia
- Phylum: Arthropoda
- Class: Insecta
- Order: Coleoptera
- Suborder: Polyphaga
- Infraorder: Staphyliniformia
- Family: Sphaeritidae
- Genus: Sphaerites
- Species: S. politus

Binomial name
- Sphaerites politus Mannerheim, 1846

Species of beetle

Sphaerites politus, commonly known as the polite beetle, is a species of false clown beetle in the family Sphaeritidae. It is found in North America.
