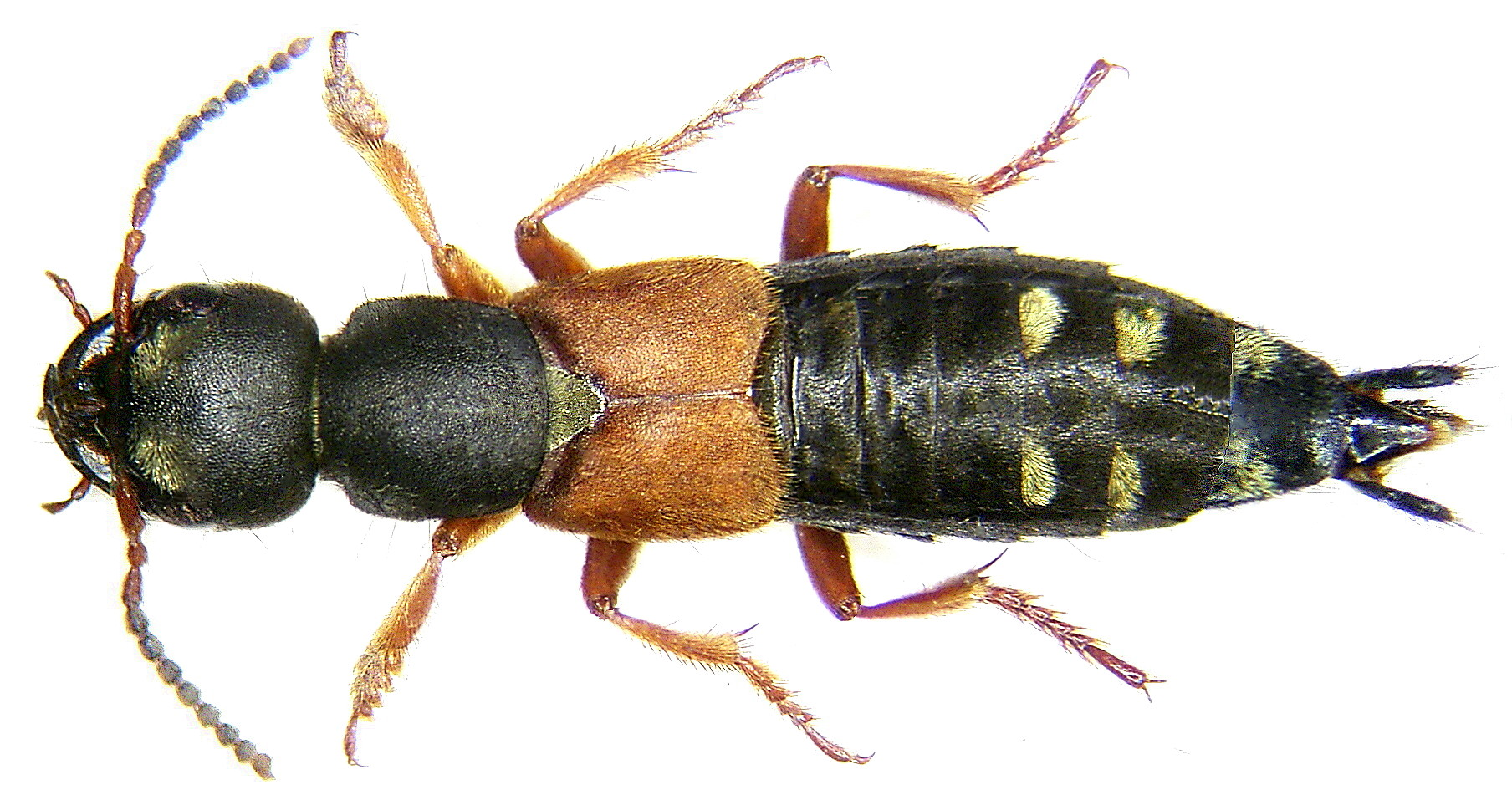
- Staphylinus erythropterus 14-18 mm

Scientific classification
- Kingdom: Animalia
- Phylum: Arthropoda
- Class: Insecta
- Order: Coleoptera
- Suborder: Polyphaga
- Infraorder: Staphyliniformia
- Family: Staphylinidae
- Genus: Staphylinus
- Species: S. erythropterus

Binomial name
- Staphylinus erythropterus Linnaeus, 1758

= Staphylinus erythropterus =

Species of beetle

Staphylinus erythropterus is a species of rove beetles native to Europe.
