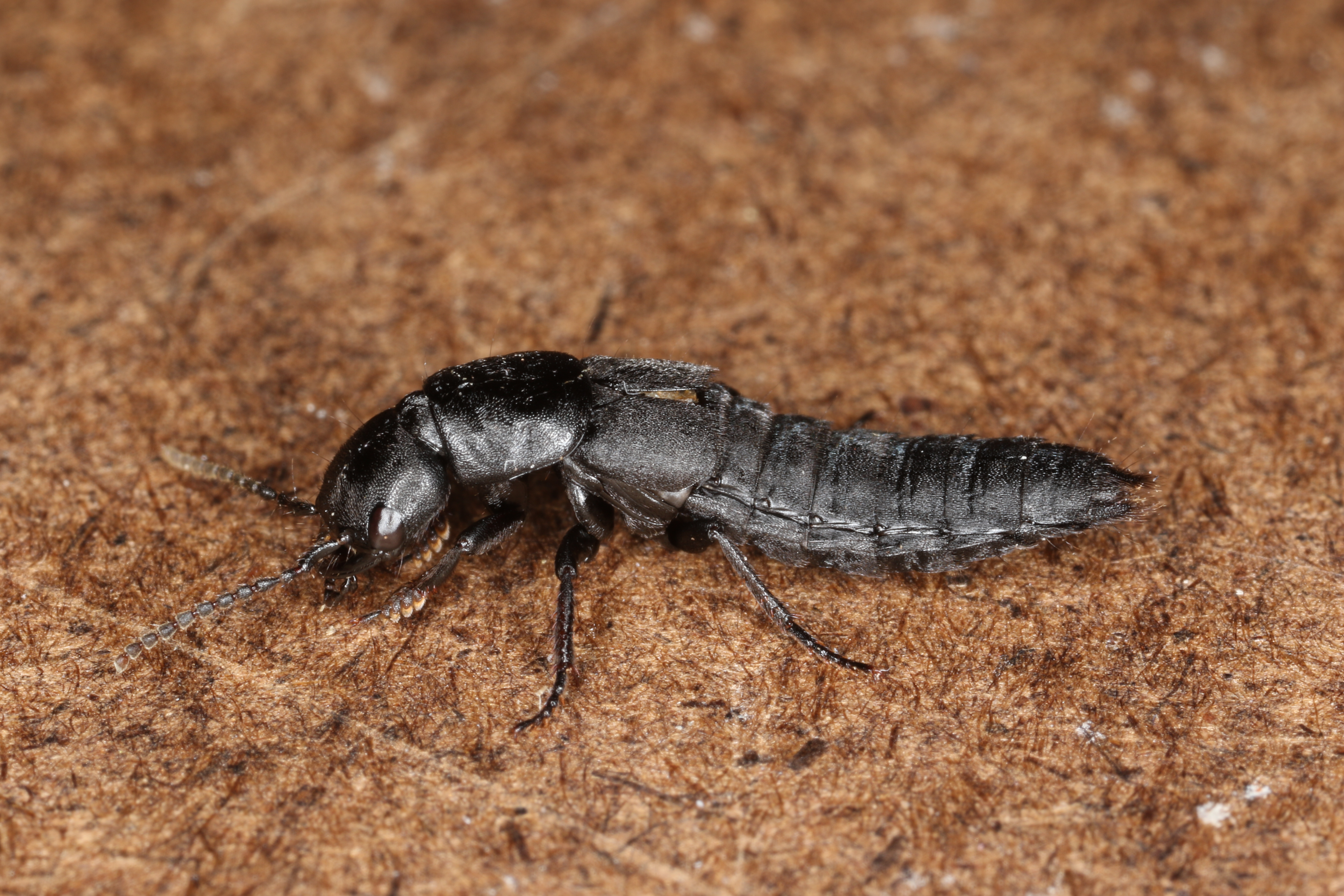

Scientific classification
- Kingdom: Animalia
- Phylum: Arthropoda
- Clade: Pancrustacea
- Class: Insecta
- Order: Coleoptera
- Suborder: Polyphaga
- Infraorder: Staphyliniformia
- Family: Staphylinidae
- Genus: Ocypus
- Species: O. nitens

Binomial name
- Ocypus nitens (Schrank, 1781)

= Ocypus nitens =

Species of beetle

Ocypus nitens is a species of large rove beetle in the family Staphylinidae.

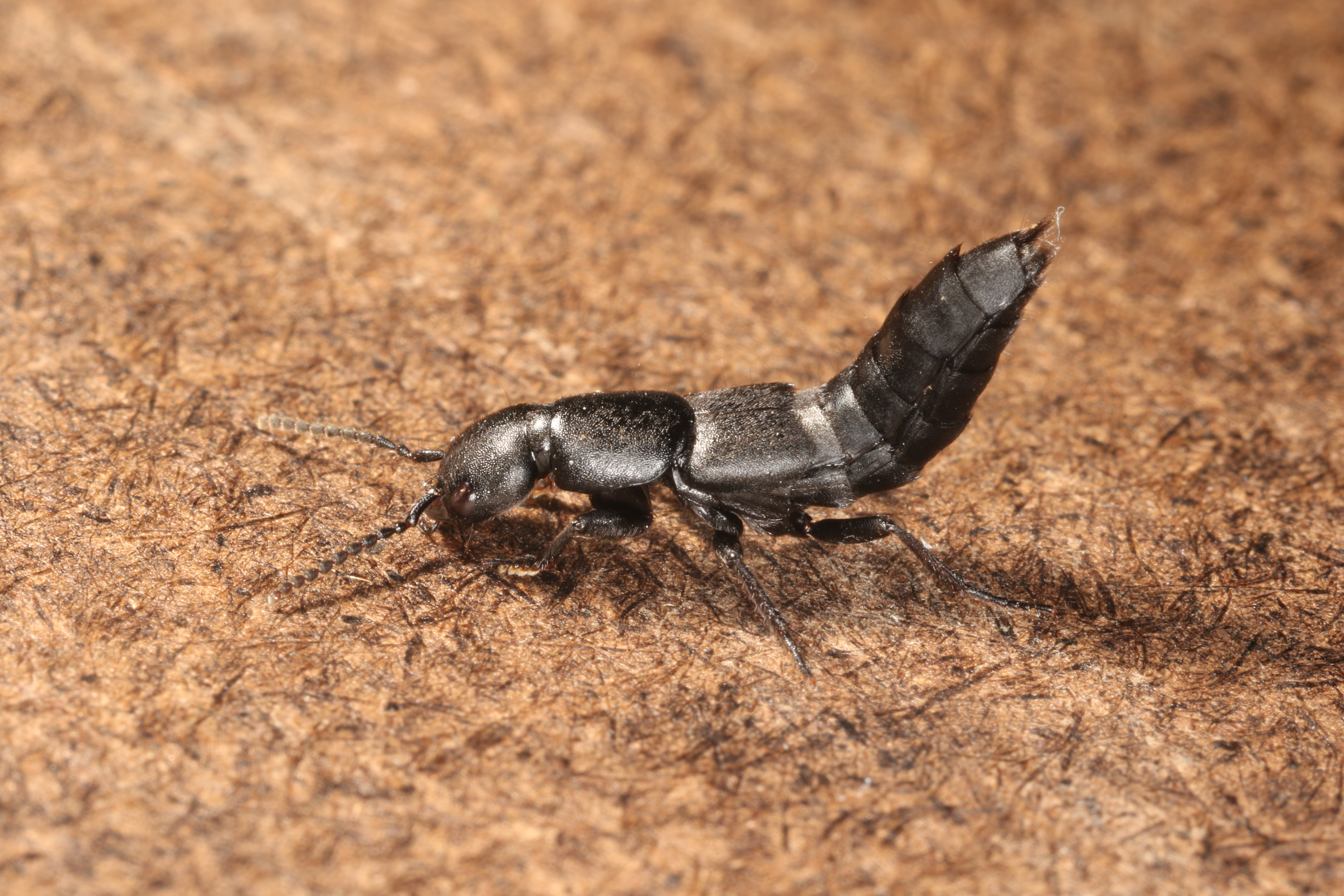

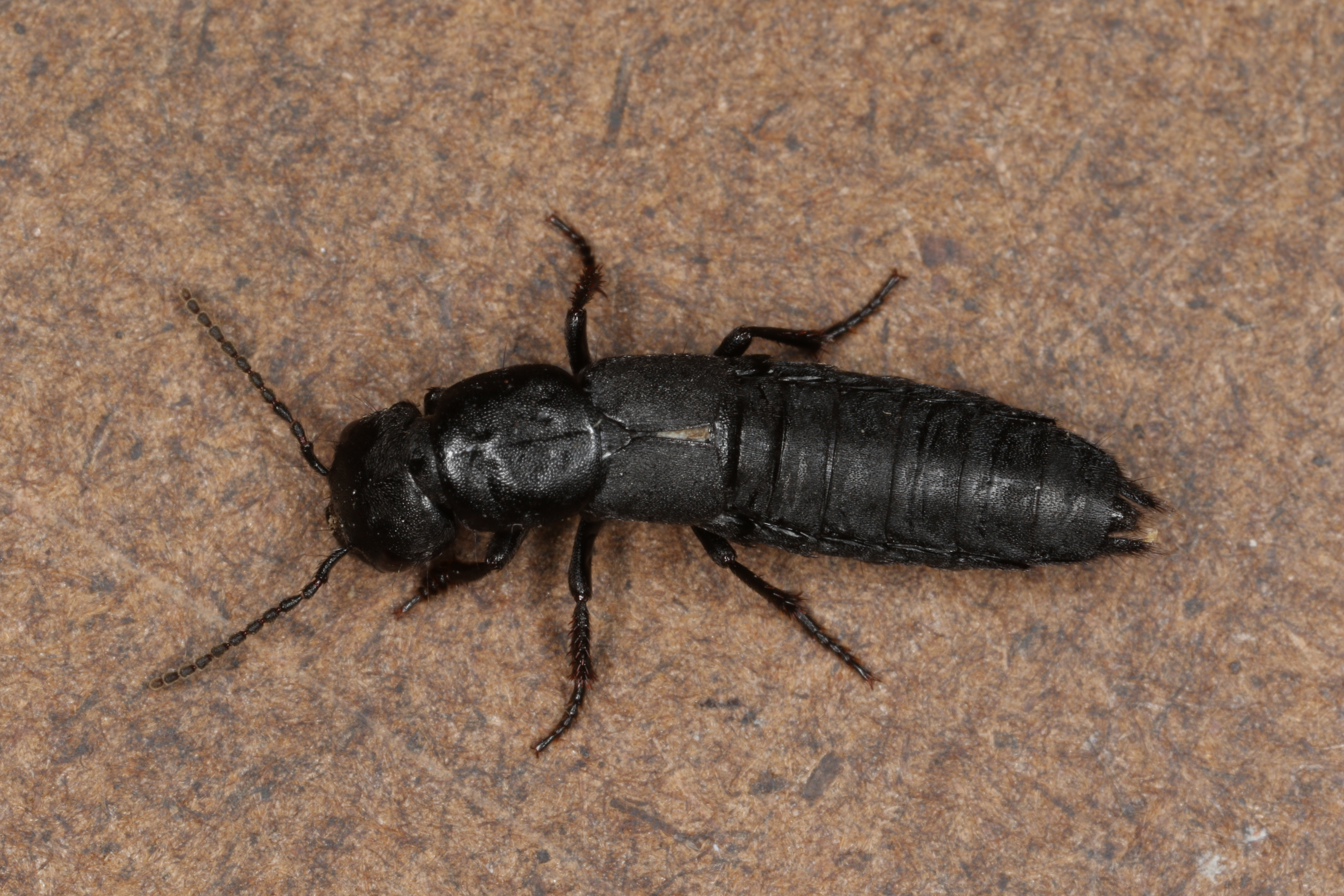

== Subspecies ==
These two subspecies belong to the species Ocypus nitens:

- Ocypus nitens grigiensis (Reitter, 1918)^{g}
- Ocypus nitens ochropus (J.Muller, 1950)^{g}

Data sources: i = ITIS, c = Catalogue of Life, g = GBIF, b = Bugguide.net
