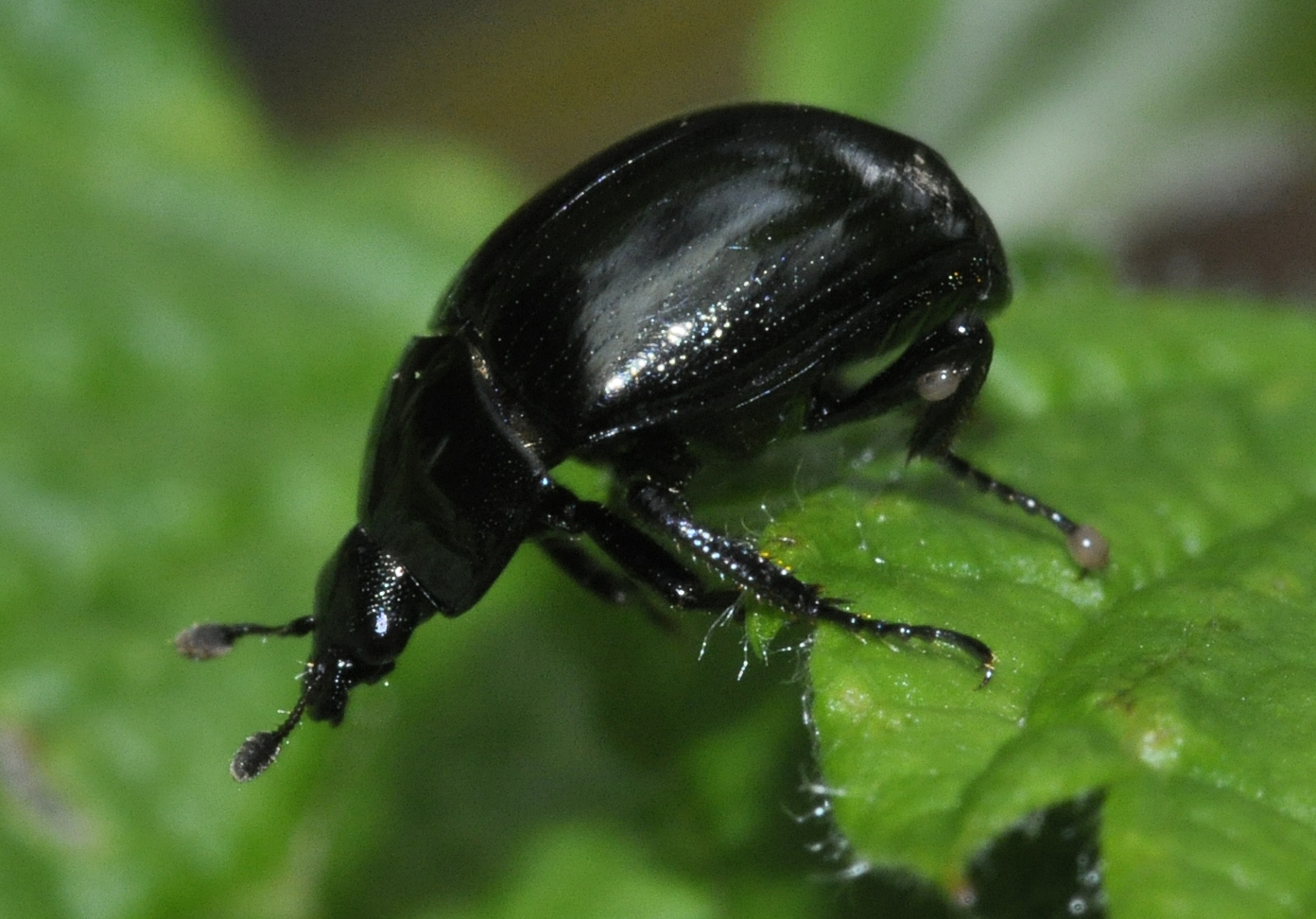

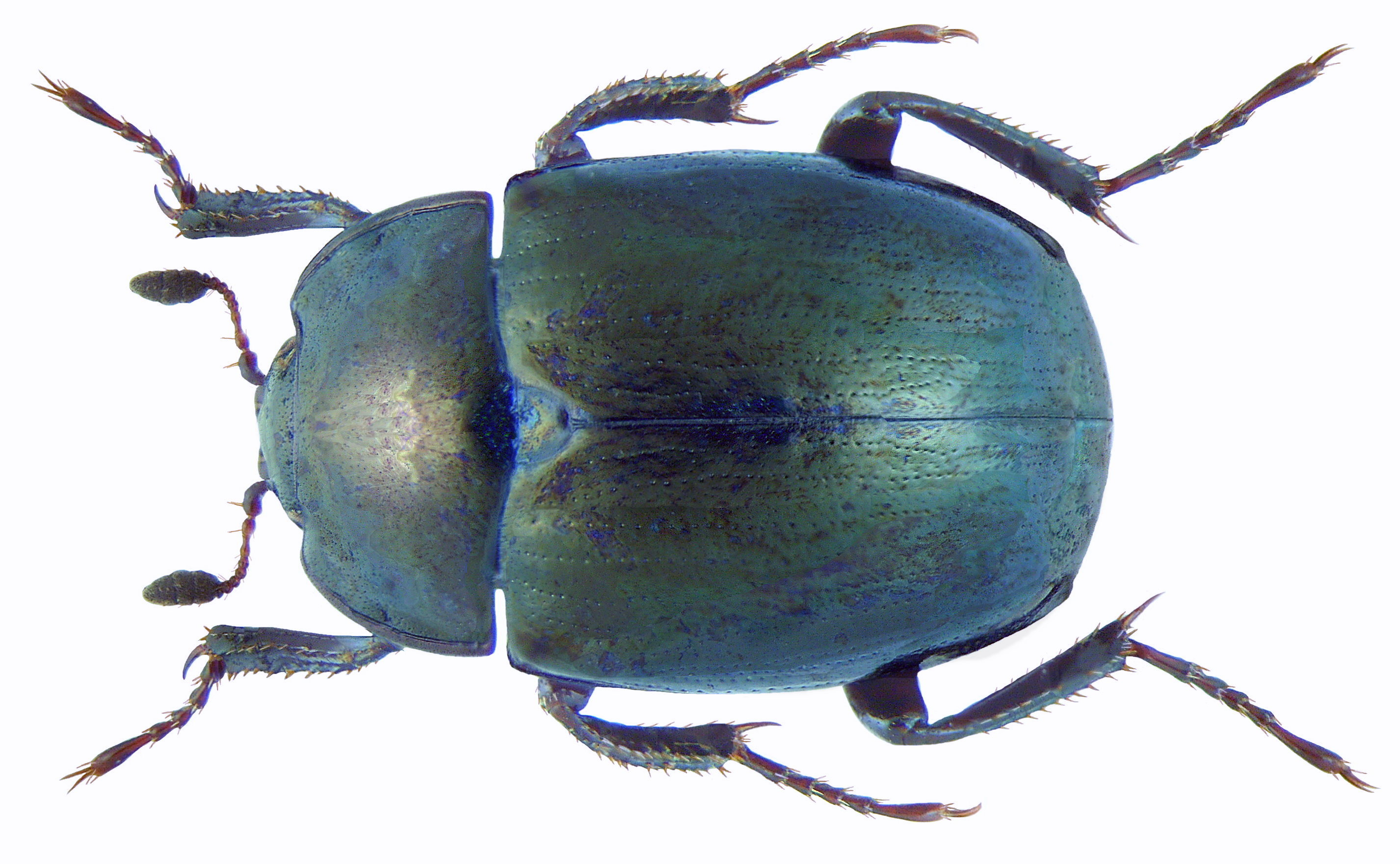
- Sphaerites glabratus

Scientific classification
- Kingdom: Animalia
- Phylum: Arthropoda
- Class: Insecta
- Order: Coleoptera
- Suborder: Polyphaga
- Infraorder: Staphyliniformia
- Superfamily: Histeroidea
- Family: Sphaeritidae; Shuckard, 1839
- Genus: Sphaerites; Duftschmid, 1805

Species
- See text

= Sphaerites =

Genus of beetles

Sphaerites is a genus of beetles, the only genus in the family Sphaeritidae, sometimes called the false clown beetles. There are five known species, which are widespread in temperate areas of the Northern Hemisphere, found in forested or upland areas.

Adults range in length from 4.5–7 mm, with oval bodies, black but with a slight bluish-green sheen.

The life histories are poorly known, but they are generally found around decaying matter and fungi. S. glabratus is associated with conifer forests in northern Europe, and seems especially attracted to sap flows from trees, feeding on the sap and then mating, with the eggs laid in sap-soaked nearby soil. The larvae have a short generation span, developing into adults within a month.

It is a member of Histeroidea, making it closely related to the true clown beetles.

== Species ==
These four species belong to the genus Sphaerites:

- Sphaerites dimidiatus Jurecek, 1934^{i c g}
- Sphaerites glabratus (Fabricius, 1792)^{i c g}
- Sphaerites nitidus Löbl, 1996^{i c g}
- Sphaerites opacus Löbl & Háva, 2002
- Sphaerites politus Mannerheim, 1846^{i c g b}

Data sources: i = ITIS, c = Catalogue of Life, g = GBIF, b = Bugguide.net
