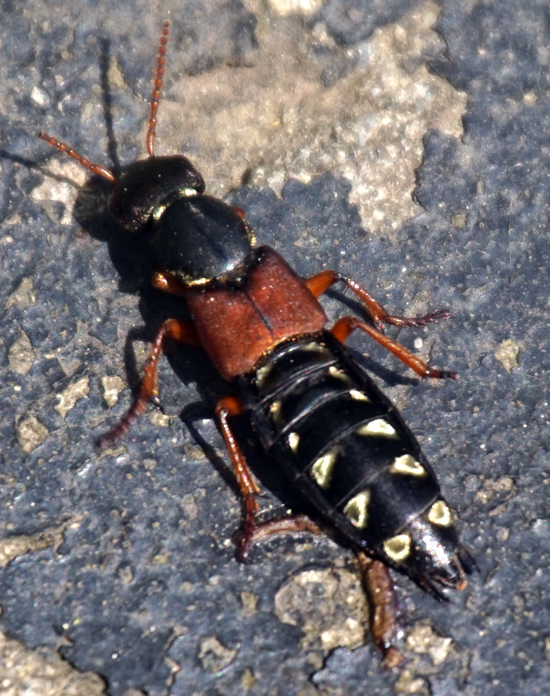
- Staphylinus caesareus

Scientific classification
- Kingdom: Animalia
- Phylum: Arthropoda
- Clade: Pancrustacea
- Class: Insecta
- Order: Coleoptera
- Suborder: Polyphaga
- Infraorder: Staphyliniformia
- Family: Staphylinidae
- Subfamily: Staphylininae
- Tribe: Staphylinini
- Subtribe: Staphylinina
- Genus: Staphylinus; Linnaeus, 1758

Synonyms
- Ouchemus Gozis, 1886; Stapilinus Berkenhout, 1795

= Staphylinus =

Genus of beetles

Staphylinus is a genus of large rove beetles in the family Staphylinidae. There are more than 50 described species in Staphylinus.

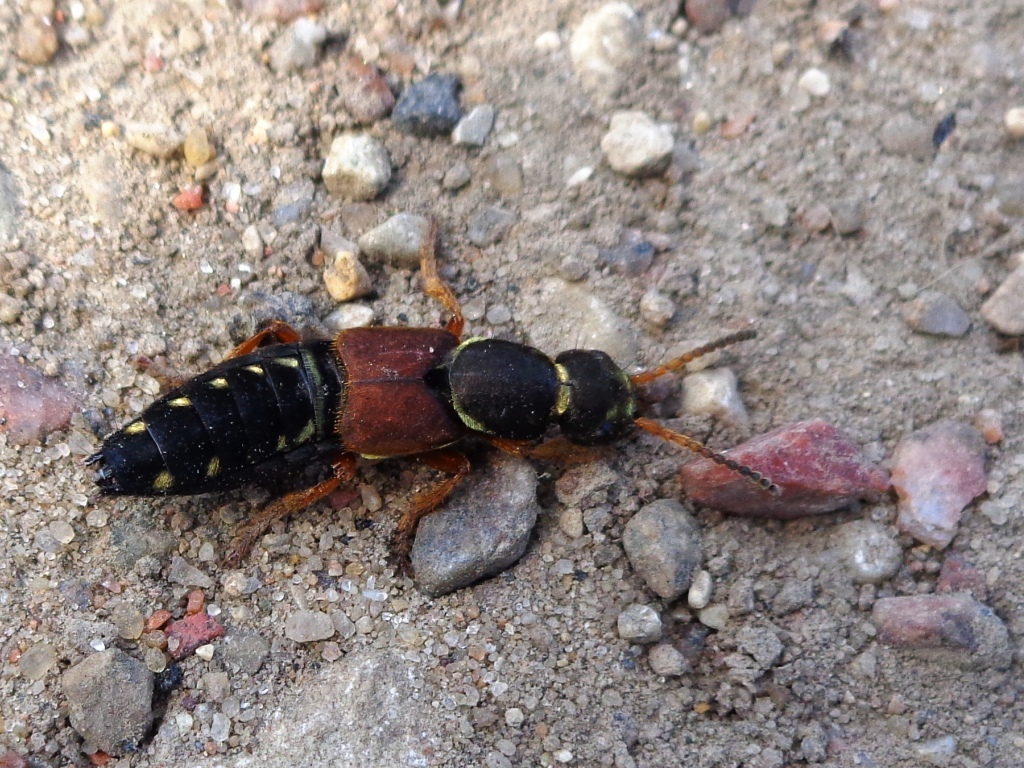
Staphylinus dimidiaticornis

== Species ==
These 58 species belong to the genus Staphylinus:

- Staphylinus agarici O.Müller, 1776
- Staphylinus anceps Runde, 1835
- Staphylinus angustatus Schrank, 1781
- Staphylinus aquisextanus Oustalet, 1874
- Staphylinus arnicae Scopoli, 1763
- Staphylinus atavus Heer, 1862
- Staphylinus bimaculatus Cameron, 1932
- Staphylinus caesareus Cederhjelm, 1798
- Staphylinus calvus Oustalet, 1874
- Staphylinus cantharellus Linnaeus, 1767
- Staphylinus carinthiacus Laporte de Castelnau, 1840
- Staphylinus compressus Geoffroy, 1785
- Staphylinus cursor Grimmer, 1841
- Staphylinus cyanipennis Runde, 1835
- Staphylinus daimio Sharp, 1889
- Staphylinus dimidiaticornis Gemminger, 1851
- Staphylinus domicellus Schrank, 1781
- Staphylinus erythropterus Linnæus, 1758
- Staphylinus floreus O.Müller, 1776
- Staphylinus formicarius O.Müller, 1776
- Staphylinus fuscicornis O.Müller, 1776
- Staphylinus germarii (Oustalet, 1874)
- Staphylinus glaucus Gmelin, 1790
- Staphylinus hellebori Scopoli, 1763
- Staphylinus ignavus Runde, 1835
- Staphylinus latus Strom, 1768
- Staphylinus macropterus Gmelin, 1790
- Staphylinus marginalis O.Müller, 1776
- Staphylinus medioximus Fairmaire, 1852
- Staphylinus melanocephalus Geoffroy, 1785
- Staphylinus melanophtalmos Geoffroy, 1785
- Staphylinus melanurus Schrank, 1798
- Staphylinus minimus Schrank, 1781
- Staphylinus minor O.Müller, 1776
- Staphylinus minutus Marsham, 1802
- Staphylinus obscurus Herbst, 1784
- Staphylinus oculatus O.Müller, 1776
- Staphylinus ornaticauda LeConte, J. L., 1863
- Staphylinus priscus Oustalet, 1874
- Staphylinus prodromus Oustalet, 1874
- Staphylinus propinquus Runde, 1835
- Staphylinus punctatus O.Müller, 1776
- Staphylinus puncticollis Runde, 1835
- Staphylinus pusillus Runde, 1835
- Staphylinus pygmaeus Villers, 1789
- Staphylinus quentzeli Paykull, 1789
- Staphylinus rhyssostomus Schrank, 1796
- Staphylinus rubellus Villers, 1789
- Staphylinus rubricollis Gmelin, 1790
- Staphylinus rubricornis (Ádám, 1987)
- Staphylinus ruficornis Latreille, 1804
- Staphylinus rufipes Fabricius, 1793
- Staphylinus spec Linnæus, 1758
- Staphylinus thoracicus Villers, 1789
- Staphylinus turfosus Schrank, 1796
- Staphylinus velox Runde, 1835
- Staphylinus vetulus Scudder, 1900
- Staphylinus vulcan Wickham, 1913
