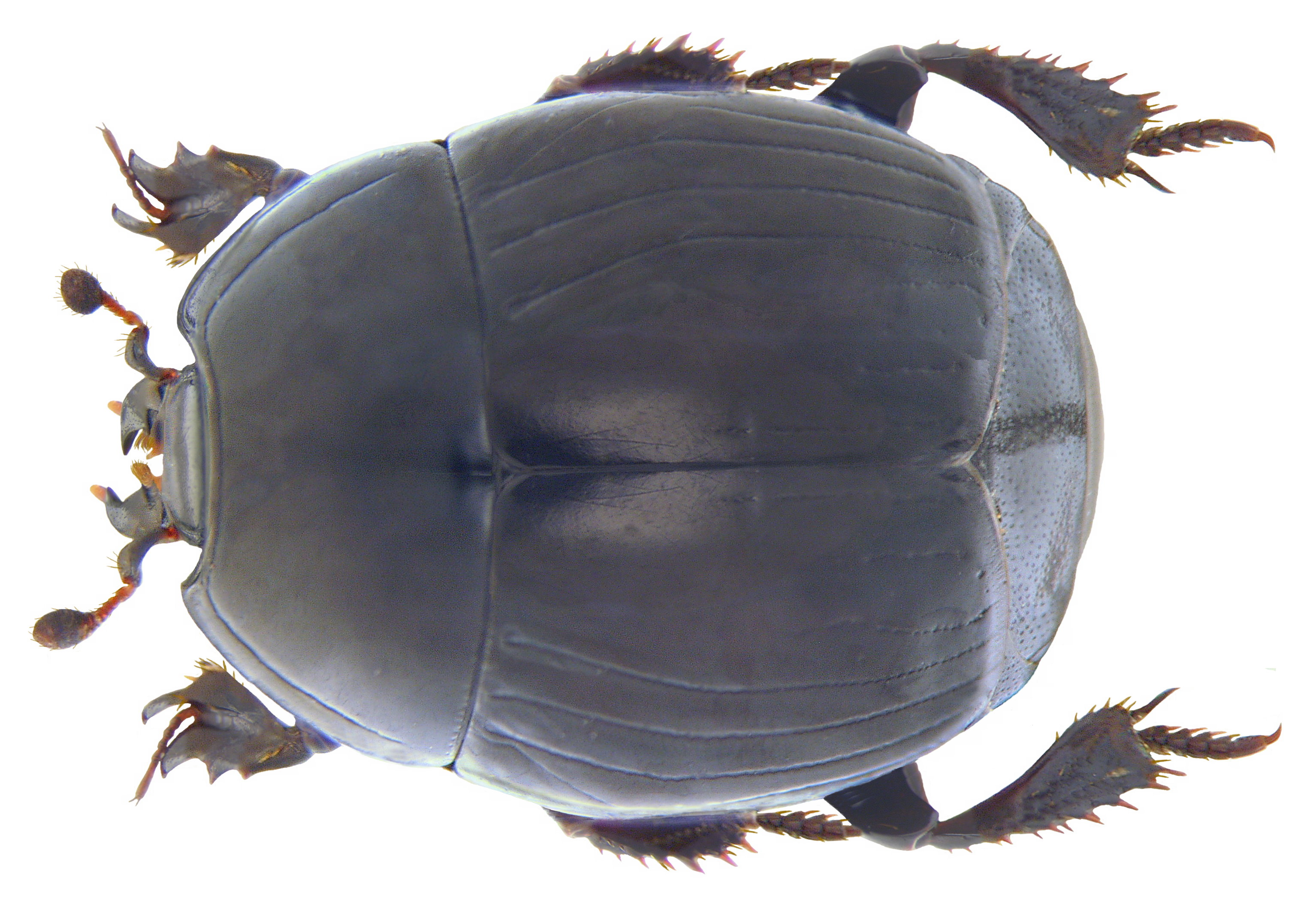
- Hister unicolor

Scientific classification
- Kingdom: Animalia
- Phylum: Arthropoda
- Class: Insecta
- Order: Coleoptera
- Suborder: Polyphaga
- Infraorder: Staphyliniformia
- Superfamily: Histeroidea; Gyllenhaal, 1808

Families
- Histeridae; Sphaeritidae; Synteliidae

= Histeroidea =

Histeroidea Temporal range: Aptian–Recent

Superfamily of beetles

Histeroidea is a superfamily of beetles in the infraorder Staphyliniformia.

== Characteristics ==
Characteristic to Histeroidea are an accessory posterior ridge (locking device) behind the hind margin and presence of medial loop and apical hinge of wing. The elytra are truncate with 1 or 2 abdominal segments visible. The abdominal 8th segment is completely invaginated in the 7th segment. Each antenna has 8 (seldom 7) segments preceding a club of fused segments. The ventral body surface is glabrous.

== Ecology ==
Histeroids in general are predators. However, Sphaeritidae is believed to only be predatory in the larval stage, with its adults being saprophagous instead.

This superfamily occurs in various habitats. The Histeridae alone can be found in dung, carrion, fungi, leaf litter, in symbiosis with other animals (e.g. social insects), under tree bark or in galleries of wood-boring beetles.

== Systematics ==
Some authors treat Histeroidea as a single family within the superfamily Hydrophiloidea (Hydrophiloidea sensu lato), as they seem to form a clade. Three extant families are currently recognized:

- Histeridae (3900+ species)
- Sphaeritidae (7 species)
- Synteliidae (9 species)

Sphaeritidae and Synteiidae each contain just a single genus: Sphaerites and Syntelia, respectively. This makes both families monotypic.

The oldest fossils of the superfamily are Cretohister and Antigracilus from the Early Cretaceous (Aptian) Yixian Formation of China, which are more closely related to Histeridae than the other two families.
