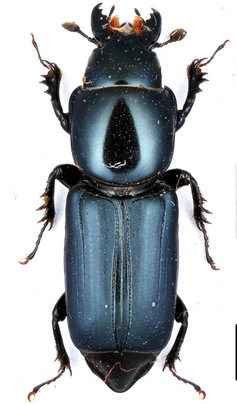
- Syntelia sp. collected from Sichuan, China

Scientific classification
- Kingdom: Animalia
- Phylum: Arthropoda
- Class: Insecta
- Order: Coleoptera
- Suborder: Polyphaga
- Infraorder: Staphyliniformia
- Superfamily: Histeroidea
- Family: Synteliidae; Lewis, 1882
- Genus: Syntelia; Westwood, 1864

Species
- Syntelia histeroides Syntelia davidis Syntelia indica Syntelia mazuri Syntelia mexicana Syntelia sinica Syntelia westwoodi

= Syntelia =

Syntelia Temporal range: Cenomanian–Recent

Genus of beetles

Syntelia is a genus of beetles. It is the only genus in the family Synteliidae. There are seven known species, which are native to high-elevation regions in southern North America from central Mexico to Guatemala, and in eastern Asia, from India to Japan and eastern Russia. They are generally associated with rotting logs, typically found under bark, though the Mexican species S. westwoodi has been found inside large decaying columnar cacti. Adults and larvae are predatory, feeding on insect larvae. A fossil species, Syntelia sunwukong, is known from the Late Cretaceous (Cenomanian) aged Burmese amber of Myanmar. Adults are around 1–3.5 centimetres (0.39–1.38 in) in length. The characteristics of the family and genus include geniculate antennae with 3-segmented club, elongate body, narrowly separated coxae and tarsi with bisetose empodia. Only one abdominal segment is exposed behind elytra. The genus described by John O. Westwood in 1864, while the family was erected by George Lewis in 1882. They are members of Histeroidea, which also includes clown beetles (Histeridae).
