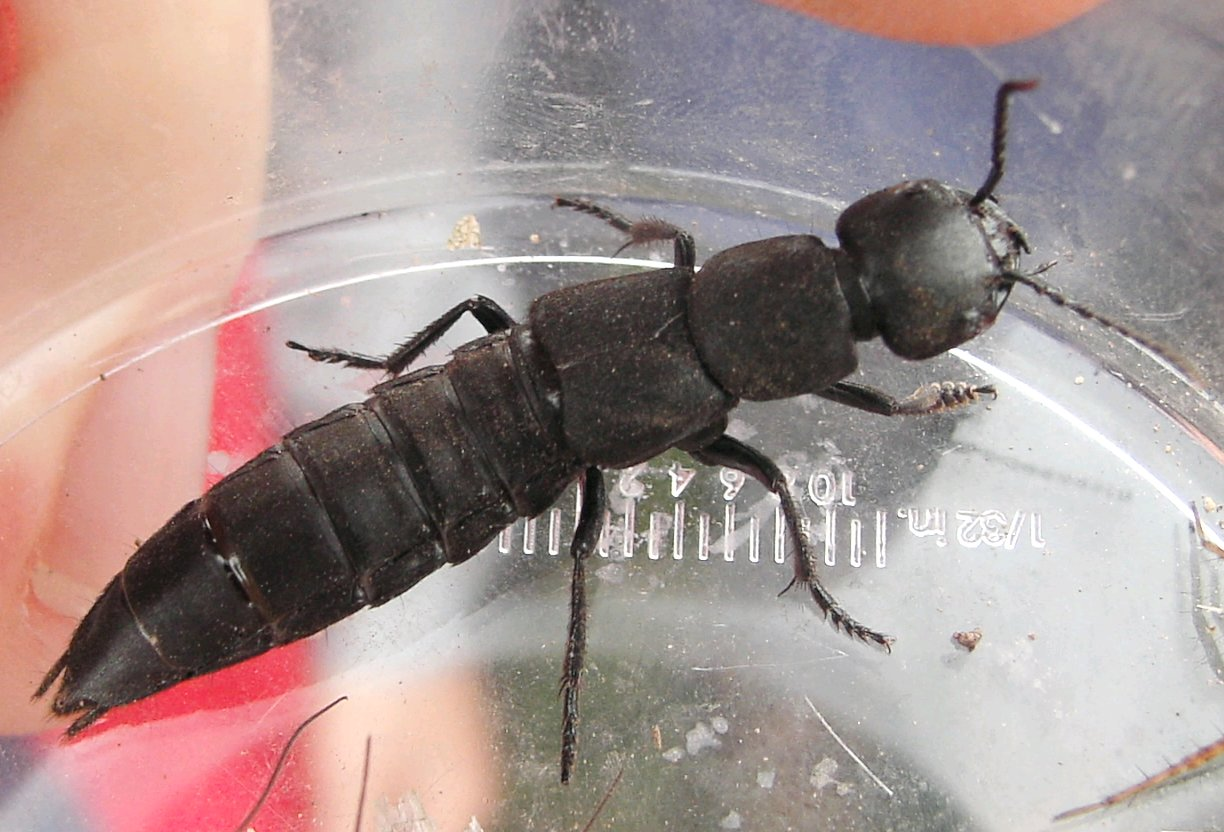
- Devil's coach horse beetle, Ocypus olens

Scientific classification
- Domain: Eukaryota
- Kingdom: Animalia
- Phylum: Arthropoda
- Class: Insecta
- Order: Coleoptera
- Suborder: Polyphaga
- Infraorder: Staphyliniformia; Lameere, 1900

Superfamilies
- See text.

= Staphyliniformia =

Staphyliniformia Temporal range: Rhaetian–Recent

Infraorder of beetles

Staphyliniformia is a large infraorder of beetles. It contains over 70,000 described species from all regions of the world. Most species occur in moist habitats - various kinds of rotting plant debris, fungi, dung, carrion, many live in fresh water.

== Characteristics ==
Most Staphyliniforms are small to average sized beetles. The diverse group has few clear apomorphies. They have primitively 11-segmented antennae, a constricted neck well behind the eyes. The pronotum has a well defined, large lateral edge. Larval legs are 5-segmented, the 10th abdominal segment is often with more-or-less fine or strong spines or hooks. Urogomphi (paired "horns" at posterior tip of abdomen of larvae and pupae) with basal articulation.

== Systematics and evolution ==
Staphyliniformia belongs to the suborder Polyphaga and is usually given an infraorder or series rank. It contains three superfamilies:

- Histeroidea, including the clown beetles.
- Hydrophiloidea, including the water scavenger beetles
- Staphylinoidea, including antlike stone beetles, carrion beetles, and rove beetles.

Some recent studies also include the superfamily Scarabaeoidea (infraorder Scarabaeiformia), forming together the so-called Hydrophiloid lineage. A sister group relationship of Hydrophiloidea and Histeroidea is strongly supported.

The unambiguous fossil record dates back to Triassic, and an early Mesozoic origin of the group is probable.

== See also ==
- List of subgroups of the order Coleoptera
