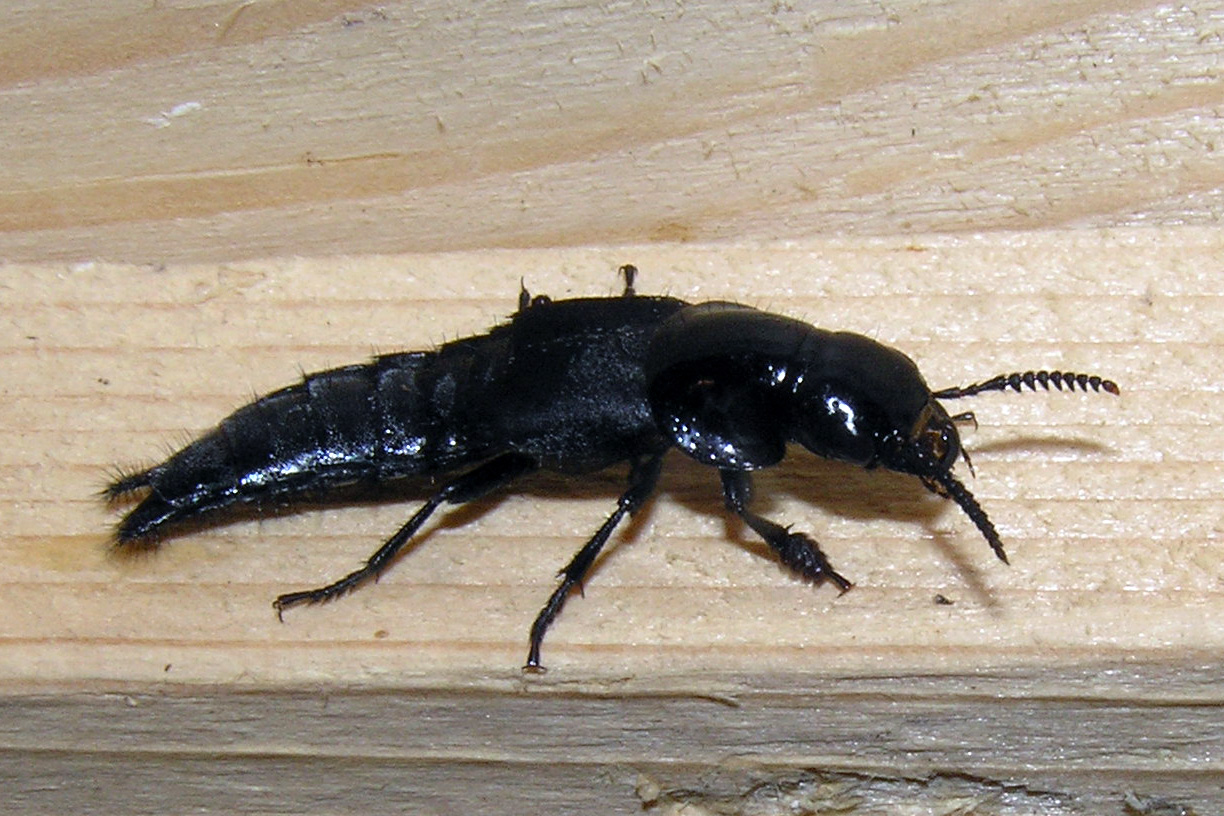
- Velleius dilatatus

Scientific classification
- Kingdom: Animalia
- Phylum: Arthropoda
- Clade: Pancrustacea
- Class: Insecta
- Order: Coleoptera
- Suborder: Polyphaga
- Infraorder: Staphyliniformia
- Family: Staphylinidae
- Tribe: Staphylinini
- Genus: Velleius; Leach, 1819

= Velleius (beetle) =

Genus of beetles

Velleius is a subgenus of the genus of beetles Quedius, belonging to the family Staphylinidae.

The genus was described in 1819 by William Elford Leach.

Species:

- Velleius dilatatus (Fabricius, 1787)
