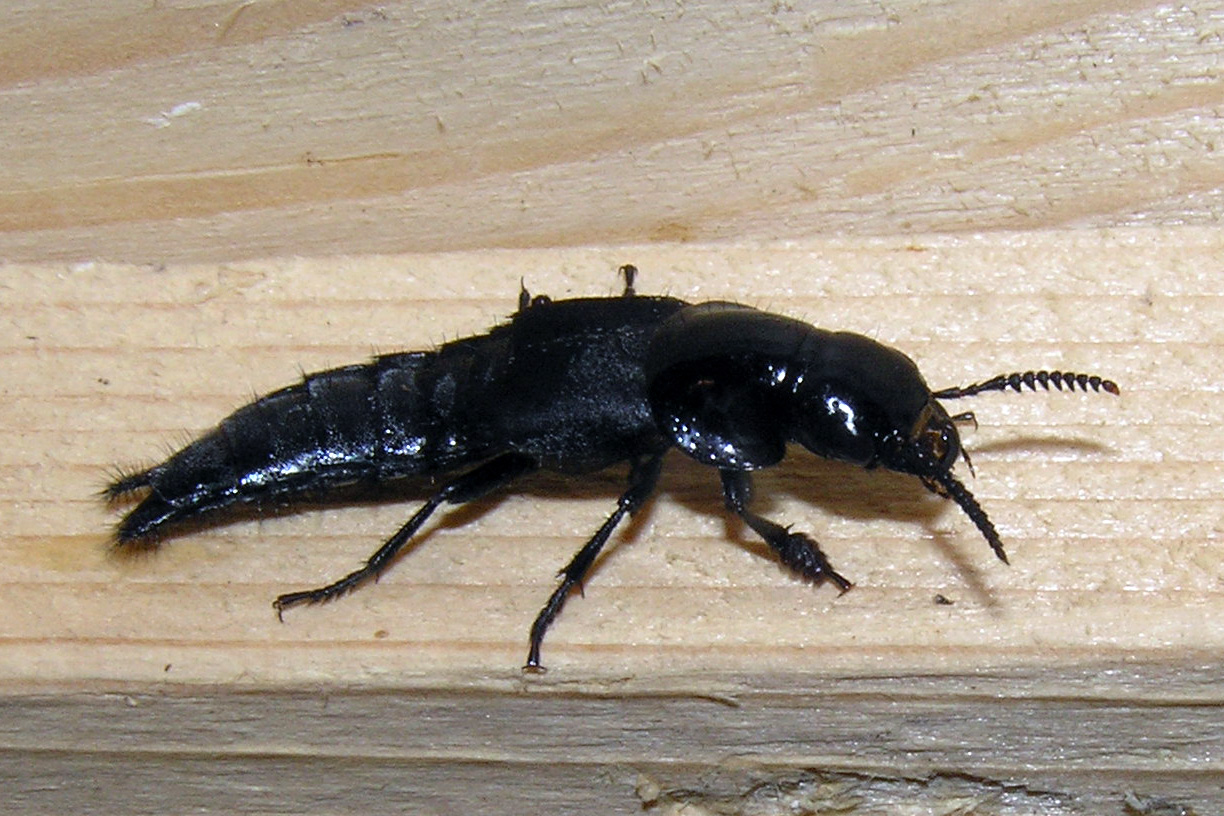

Scientific classification
- Kingdom: Animalia
- Phylum: Arthropoda
- Clade: Pancrustacea
- Class: Insecta
- Order: Coleoptera
- Suborder: Polyphaga
- Infraorder: Staphyliniformia
- Family: Staphylinidae
- Genus: Velleius
- Species: V. dilatatus

Binomial name
- Velleius dilatatus (Fabricius, 1787)

Synonyms
- Staphylinus dilatatus Fabricius, 1787; Staphylinus serraticornis Schrank, 1798; Staphylinus concolor Marsham, 1802; Quedius (Velleius) dilatatus (Fabricius 1787)

= Velleius dilatatus =

Species of beetle

Velleius dilatatus, the hornet rove beetle, is a species of rove beetle belonging to the family Staphylinidae. This beetle is commensal with the European hornet (Vespa crabro), living in its nests.

== Taxonomy ==
Velleius dilatatus was first formally described in 1787 as Staphylinus dilatatus by the Danish biologist Johan Christian Fabricius with its type locality given as Saxony ("Halae Saxonum"). This species is classified within the genus Quedius by some authorities who treat Velleius as a subgenus of Quedius.

== Description ==
Velleius dilatatus is a large species of rove beetle being between 10 and 25 mm (0.39 and 0.98 in), and is completely black or dark brown in colour with a rounded, laterally flattened pronotum. They have a large head with weakly convex eyes and long and curved temples, The surface of the exoskeleton is matt because there is strong microsculpture. The mandibles are large and asymmetrical; the right mandible has a prominent tooth and the left has three smaller teeth. The antennae has 11 segments with the segments between the fourth and the tenth being serrated. The pronotum is rounded, creating angles towards the front, and is flattened laterally and has a strong microsculpture which leads it to appear iridescent in low-angle lighting. The elytra is quadrangular and matt, with sparse recumbent short hairs and scattered longer stuiff hairs, especially on the sides. The abdomen is evenly tapering towards the tip and has clear raised borders on the sides, it has strong microsculpture and is weakly iridescent. The legs are long and rather robust with straight tibiae which widen towards their apex and have a pair of long spurs on the inner apical angle.

== Distribution ==
Velleius dilatatus is found in the Western Palearctic from southern Great Britain east to European Russia and southern Finland south to the Pyrenees and Corsica.

== Biology ==
Velleius dilatatus spend most of their adult lives in the nests of European hornets, typically in tree-hollows but they have also been recorded from houses. They feed upon diptera larvae etc. which they find by the accumulated debris in the nest. However, they are known to leave nests on warm evenings, when the temperature exceeds 16 °C (61 °F), to prey on other insects or to visit sap-runs on oak and beech trees. They have a keen sense of smell and they are thought to be able to detect sap and navigate to and from the nest by following the scent. These beetles are good fliers and they normally land at a sap-run roughly an hour after dark and there may be a few of them in attendance at a single sap-run. They do not associate with each other, remaining separated and do not move much when feeding. They will stay at the sap-run for much of the night, regularly detecting and preying on other insects that come to the sap-run. Their larvae grow within the nest detritus, eating other insects and, maybe, the dead and dying hornets too. As many as ten adult beetles and larvae may be found in a nest, and while they do not appear to prey on the hornets or their larvae, the nest must be occupied by hornets for the beetles to persist.
