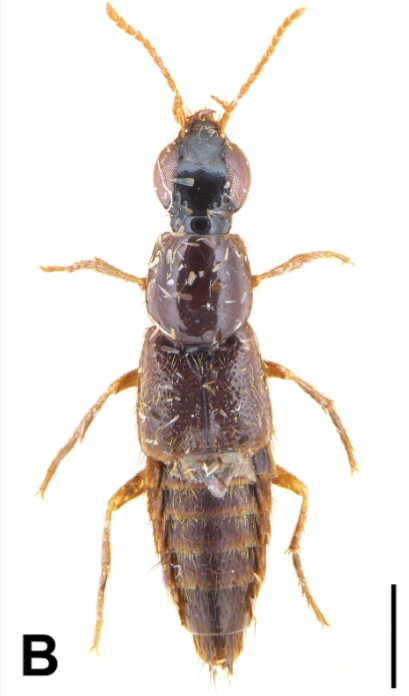

Scientific classification
- Kingdom: Animalia
- Phylum: Arthropoda
- Class: Insecta
- Order: Coleoptera
- Suborder: Polyphaga
- Infraorder: Staphyliniformia
- Family: Staphylinidae
- Genus: Quedius
- Species: Q. muscicola

Binomial name
- Quedius muscicola Scheerpeltz, 1965

Synonyms
- Quedius (Raphirus) muscicola Cameron, 1932; Quedius (Raphirus) dohertyi Cameron, 1932; Quedius (Raphirus) heterogaster Cameron, 1944; Quedius (Raphirus) kambaitiensis Scheerpeltz, 1965

= Quedius muscicola =

Species of beetle

Quedius muscicola is a species of beetle of the family Staphylinidae. It is found in India (West Bengal, Himachal Pradesh, Uttar Pradesh), Nepal, Myanmar and China (Gansu, Guizhou, Hubei, Shaanxi, Sichuan, Yunnan).
