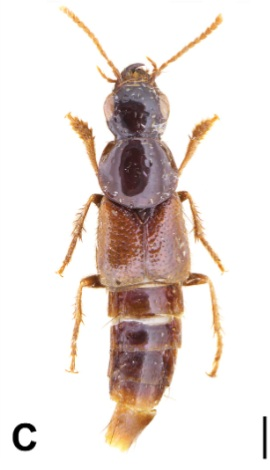

Scientific classification
- Kingdom: Animalia
- Phylum: Arthropoda
- Class: Insecta
- Order: Coleoptera
- Suborder: Polyphaga
- Infraorder: Staphyliniformia
- Family: Staphylinidae
- Genus: Quedius
- Species: Q. rutilipennis

Binomial name
- Quedius rutilipennis Scheerpeltz, 1965

Synonyms
- Quedius (Microsaurus) rutilipennis Scheerpeltz, 1965; Quedius (Microsaurus) cornutus Cai et al., 2015

= Quedius rutilipennis =

Species of beetle

Quedius rutilipennis is a species of beetle of the family Staphylinidae. It is found in Myanmar (Kachin) and an adjacent area of Yunnan, China.
