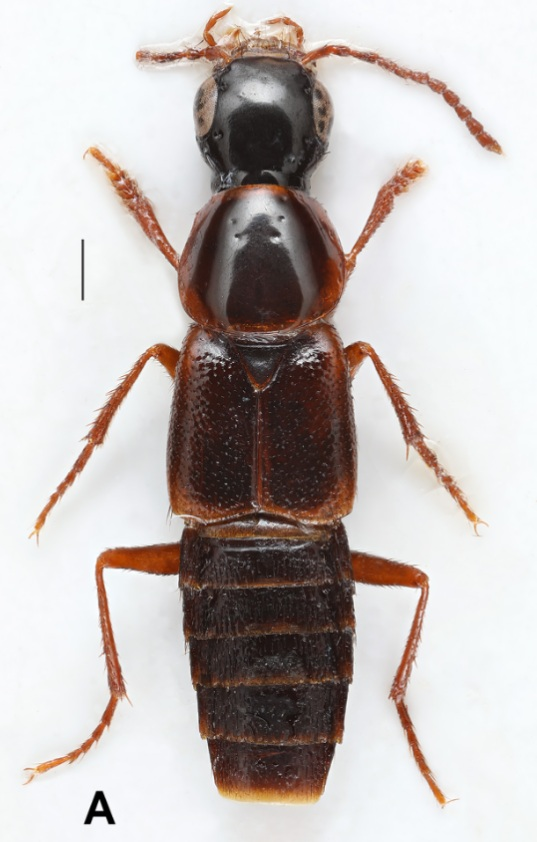

Scientific classification
- Kingdom: Animalia
- Phylum: Arthropoda
- Class: Insecta
- Order: Coleoptera
- Suborder: Polyphaga
- Infraorder: Staphyliniformia
- Family: Staphylinidae
- Genus: Quedius
- Species: Q. viator

Binomial name
- Quedius viator Salnitska & Solodovnikov, 2022

= Quedius viator =

Species of beetle

Quedius viator is a species of beetle of the family Staphylinidae. It is found in Kyrgyzstan, where it is only known from the Kyrgyz-Alatoo Mountains, where it was collected at an elevation of 3000 meters.

== Description ==
They have a mainly dark brown body with paler appendages. The head is piceous-black, the abdomen dark brown and the pronotum and elytra are brownish with paler lateral margins. The antennae and legs are uniformly light brown. They have fully developed wings.

== Etymology ==
The species name is derived from the Latin noun viator (meaning traveller) and refers to the fact that the species, presumably closely related to a group of Mediterranean species, appears far away, in Middle Asia.
