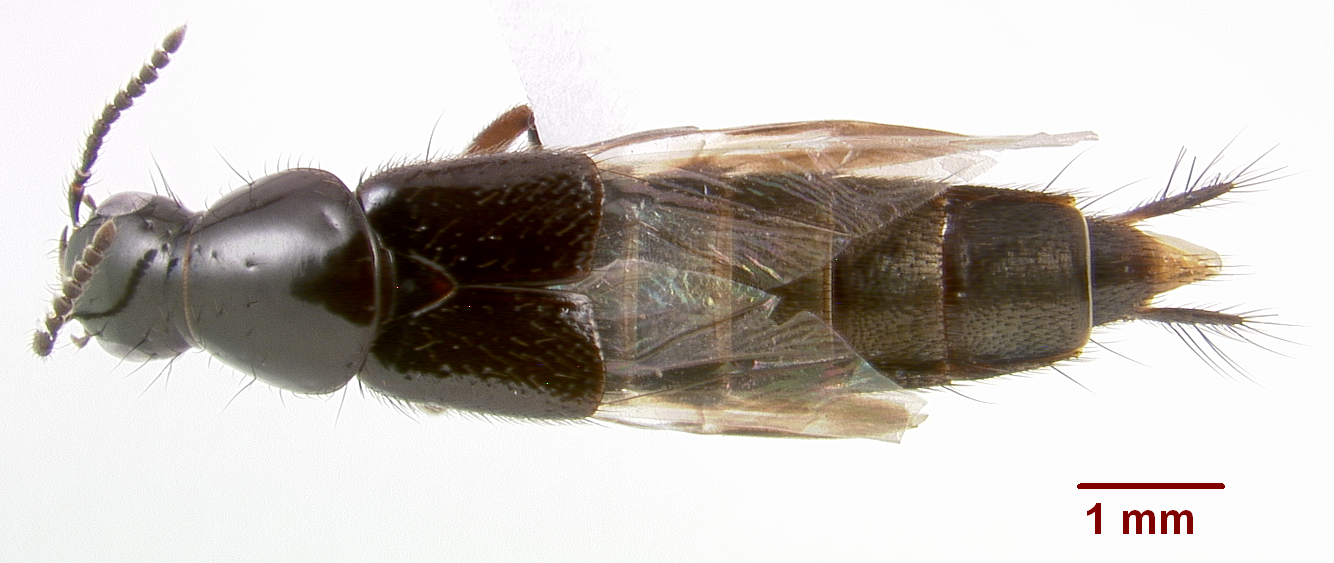

Scientific classification
- Kingdom: Animalia
- Phylum: Arthropoda
- Class: Insecta
- Order: Coleoptera
- Suborder: Polyphaga
- Infraorder: Staphyliniformia
- Family: Staphylinidae
- Genus: Quedius
- Species: Q. capucinus

Binomial name
- Quedius capucinus (Gravenhorst, 1806)

= Quedius capucinus =

Species of beetle

Quedius capucinus is a species of large rove beetle in the family Staphylinidae.
