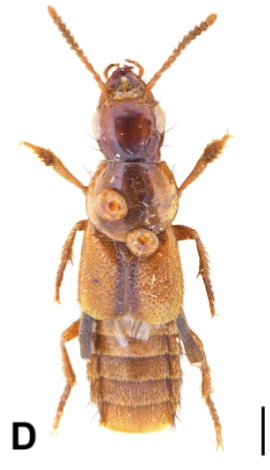

Scientific classification
- Kingdom: Animalia
- Phylum: Arthropoda
- Class: Insecta
- Order: Coleoptera
- Suborder: Polyphaga
- Infraorder: Staphyliniformia
- Family: Staphylinidae
- Genus: Quedius
- Species: Q. piceolineatus

Binomial name
- Quedius piceolineatus Scheerpeltz, 1965

Synonyms
- Quedius (Microsaurus) piceolineatus Scheerpeltz, 1965

= Quedius piceolineatus =

Species of beetle

Quedius piceolineatus is a species of beetle of the family Staphylinidae. It is found in Myanmar (Kachin).
