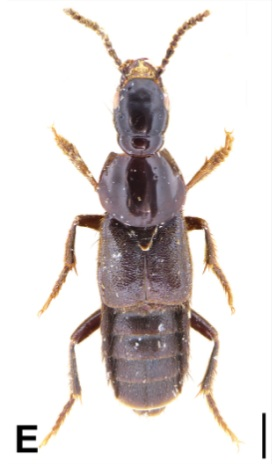

Scientific classification
- Kingdom: Animalia
- Phylum: Arthropoda
- Class: Insecta
- Order: Coleoptera
- Suborder: Polyphaga
- Infraorder: Staphyliniformia
- Family: Staphylinidae
- Genus: Quedius
- Species: Q. impressithorax

Binomial name
- Quedius impressithorax Scheerpeltz, 1965

Synonyms
- Quedius (Microsaurus) impressithorax Scheerpeltz, 1965

= Quedius impressithorax =

Species of beetle

Quedius impressithorax is a species of beetle of the family Staphylinidae. It is found in Myanmar (Kachin).

== Description ==
Adults have a dark brown head, elytra, abdomen, antennae and legs, while the pronotum and apices of the abdominal tergites are slightly paler and dark reddish brown. The apical tarsomeres of all legs are paler and yellow-brown and the abdomen is vaguely iridescent.
