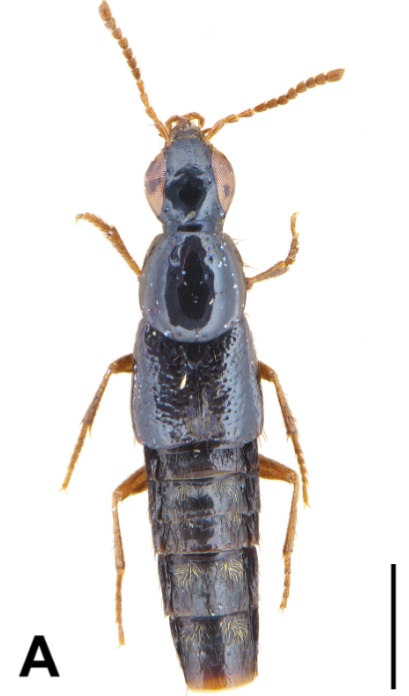

Scientific classification
- Kingdom: Animalia
- Phylum: Arthropoda
- Class: Insecta
- Order: Coleoptera
- Suborder: Polyphaga
- Infraorder: Staphyliniformia
- Family: Staphylinidae
- Genus: Quedius
- Species: Q. semilaeviventris

Binomial name
- Quedius semilaeviventris Scheerpeltz, 1965

Synonyms
- Quedius (Raphirus) semilaeviventris Scheerpeltz, 1965; Quedius (Raphirus) sundar Smetana, 1988; Quedius (Raphirus) hecato Smetana, 2012b

= Quedius semilaeviventris =

Species of beetle

Quedius semilaeviventris is a species of beetle of the family Staphylinidae. It is found in Nepal, Myanmar (Kachin) and China (Yunnan).
