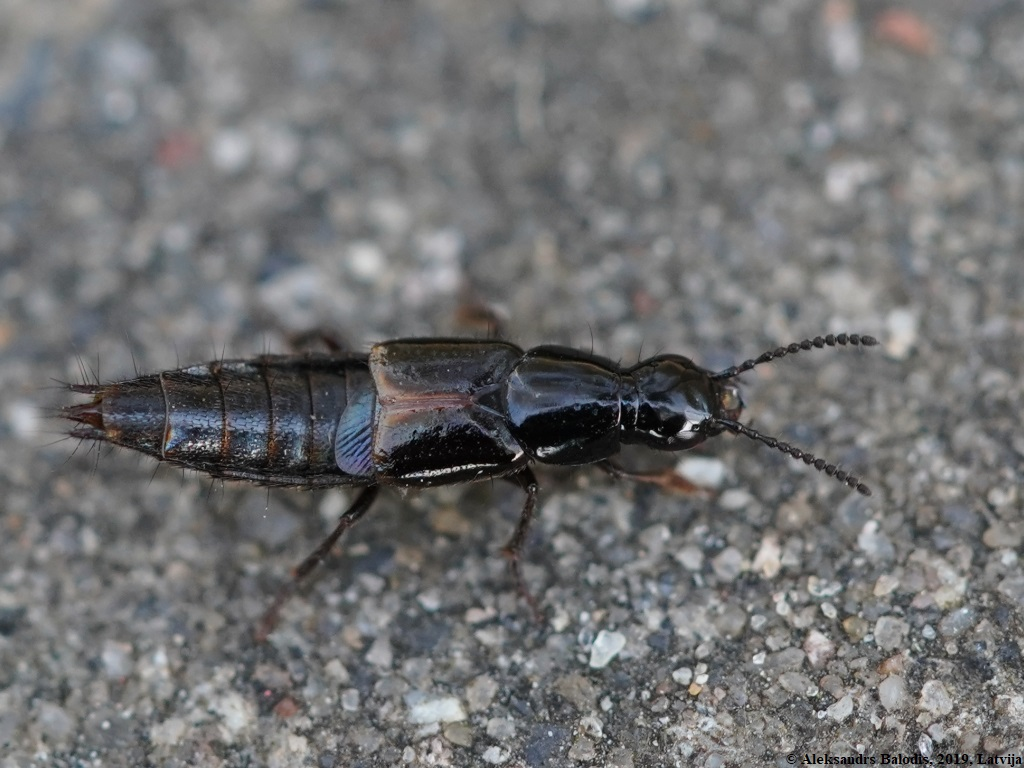

Scientific classification
- Kingdom: Animalia
- Phylum: Arthropoda
- Clade: Pancrustacea
- Class: Insecta
- Order: Coleoptera
- Suborder: Polyphaga
- Infraorder: Staphyliniformia
- Family: Staphylinidae
- Genus: Quedius
- Species: Q. cinctus

Binomial name
- Quedius cinctus (Paykull, 1790)

= Quedius cinctus =

Species of beetle

Quedius cinctus is a species of large rove beetle in the family Staphylinidae.
