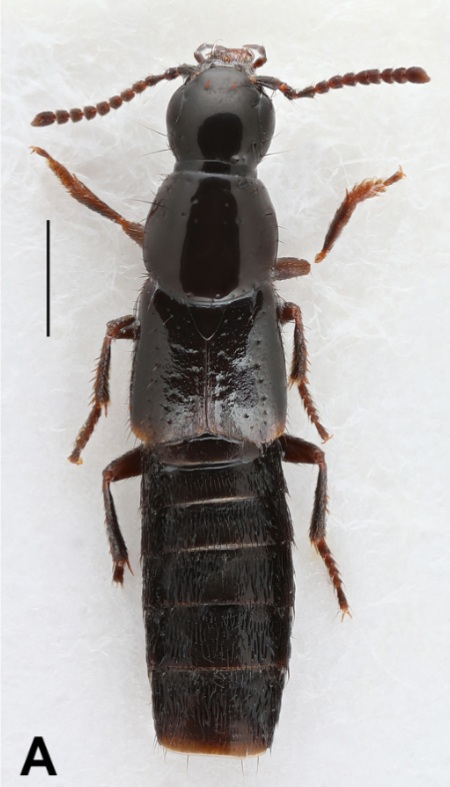

Scientific classification
- Kingdom: Animalia
- Phylum: Arthropoda
- Class: Insecta
- Order: Coleoptera
- Suborder: Polyphaga
- Infraorder: Staphyliniformia
- Family: Staphylinidae
- Genus: Quedius
- Species: Q. gissaricus

Binomial name
- Quedius gissaricus Salnitska & Solodovnikov, 2022

= Quedius gissaricus =

Species of beetle

Quedius gissaricus is a species of beetle of the family Staphylinidae. It is found in Gissar Mountain Range in Tajikistan.

== Description ==
They have a black body with reddish appendages. The head and pronotum are completely black, while the elytra and abdomen are black with paler margins. They have fully developed wings.

== Etymology ==
The species name is derived from the mountain range where this specimen was collected.
