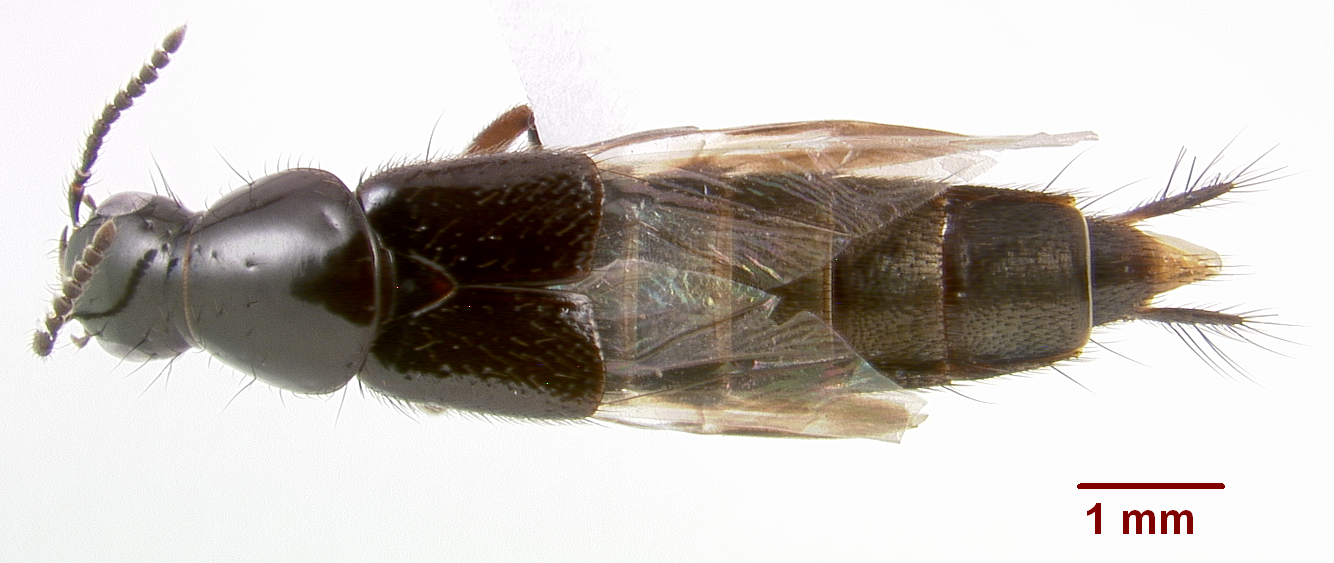
- Quedius capucinus

Scientific classification
- Kingdom: Animalia
- Phylum: Arthropoda
- Clade: Pancrustacea
- Class: Insecta
- Order: Coleoptera
- Suborder: Polyphaga
- Infraorder: Staphyliniformia
- Family: Staphylinidae
- Tribe: Staphylinini
- Subtribe: Quediina
- Genus: Quedius; Stephens, 1829

= Quedius =

Genus of beetles

Quedius is a genus of large rove beetles in the family Staphylinidae. There are about 800 described species in Quedius.

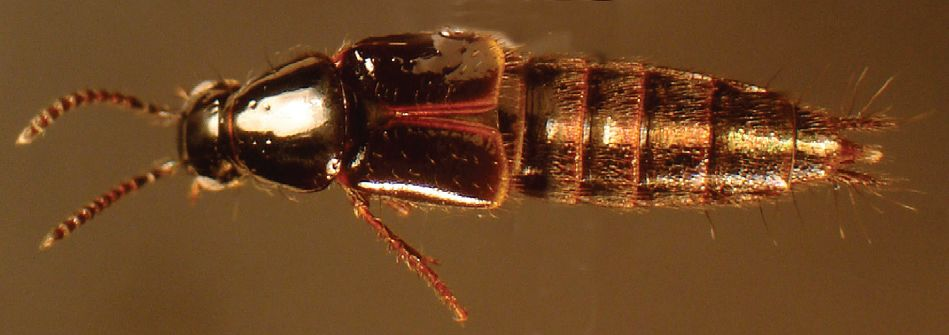
Quedius cinctus

== Selected species ==
- Quedius brunnipennis Mannerheim, 1843
- Quedius canadensis (Casey, 1915)
- Quedius capitalis Eppelsheim, 1892
- Quedius capucinus (Gravenhorst, 1806)
- Quedius cinctus (Paykull, 1790)
- Quedius cohaesus Eppelsheim, 1888
- Quedius cruentus (Olivier, 1975)
- Quedius curtipennis
- Quedius dilatatus (Fabricius, 1787)
- Quedius erythrogaster
- Quedius explanatus
- Quedius fulvicollis (Stephens, 1833)
- Quedius fusicornis Luze, 1904
- Quedius gissaricus Salnitska & Solodovnikov, 2022
- Quedius hauseri Bernhauer, 1918
- Quedius imitator Luze, 1904
- Quedius impressithorax Scheerpeltz, 1965
- Quedius jenisseensis Sahlberg, 1880
- Quedius koltzei Eppelsheim, 1887
- Quedius laticollis
- Quedius limbatus Heer, 1839
- Quedius limbifer
- Quedius molochinoides Smetana, 1965
- Quedius muscicola Cameron, 1932
- Quedius novus Eppelsheim, 1892
- Quedius ochripennis Ménetries, 1832
- Quedius pediculus (Nordmann, 1837)
- Quedius peregrinus (Gravenhorst, 1806)
- Quedius piceolineatus Scheerpeltz, 1965
- Quedius plagiatus Mannerheim, 1846
- Quedius prostans Horn, 1878
- Quedius pseudoumbrinus Lohse, 1958
- Quedius puncticollis Thomson, 1867
- Quedius rutilipennis Scheerpeltz, 1965
- Quedius semilaeviventris Scheerpeltz, 1965
- Quedius simulator
- Quedius tenellus (Gravenhorst, 1806)
- Quedius viator Salnitska & Solodovnikov, 2022

== Other sources ==
- Brunke A, Marshall S (2011). "Contributions to the faunistics and bionomics of Staphylinidae (Coleoptera) in northeastern North America: discoveries made through study of the University of Guelph Insect Collection, Ontario, Canada". ZooKeys 75: 29–68.
- Klimaszewski J, McLean J, Chandler D, Savard K, Li A (2009). "Survey of rove beetles (Coleoptera, Staphylinidae) from Stanley Park, Vancouver, British Columbia, Canada, with new records and description of a new species. Part 2". ZooKeys 22: 19–33.
- Klimaszewski J, McLean J, Li A, Savard K (2009). "Survey of rove beetles (Coleoptera, Staphylinidae) from Stanley Park, Vancouver, British Columbia, Canada, with new records and description of a new species. Part 1". ZooKeys 22: 5–17.
- Klimaszewski J, Webster R, Savard K (2009). "Review of the rove beetle species of the subtribe Gyrophaenina Kraatz (Coleoptera, Staphylinidae) from New Brunswick, Canada: new species, provincial records and bionomic information". ZooKeys 22: 81–170.
