= List of Platydracus species =

These 287 species belong to the genus of rove beetles, Platydracus.

== Platydracus species ==
- Platydracus acupunctipennis (Bernhauer, 1907)
- Platydracus aeneipennis (Cameron, 1930)
- Platydracus aeneoacreus (Cameron, 1930)
- Platydracus aeneoniger (Bernhauer, 1933)
- Platydracus afer (Erichson, 1839)
- Platydracus affinis (Solsky, 1868)
- Platydracus allardi Levasseur, 1967
- Platydracus alluaudi (Fauvel, 1905)
- Platydracus amamiensis Ito & T., 1982
- Platydracus amazonicus (Sharp, 1876)
- Platydracus angusticeps (Sharp, 1884)
- Platydracus antiquus (Nordmann, 1837)
- Platydracus apicipennis (Sharp, 1884)
- Platydracus asemus (Kraatz, 1859)
- Platydracus associatus (Cameron, 1937)
- Platydracus aureofasciatus (Motschulsky, 1861)
- Platydracus aurichalceus (Cameron, 1941)
- Platydracus auricomus (Cameron, 1929)
- Platydracus aurifluus (Erichson, 1839)
- Platydracus auroaeneus (Cameron, 1938)
- Platydracus auronotatus (Fauvel, 1895)
- Platydracus auropubescens (Cameron, 1930)
- Platydracus bakeri (Bernhauer, 1915)
- Platydracus basicornis (Fauvel, 1895)
- Platydracus becquarti (Bernhauer, 1938)
- Platydracus belti (Sharp, 1884)
- Platydracus bengalensis (Bernhauer, 1914)
- Platydracus biguttatus (Bernhauer, 1937)
- Platydracus birmanus (Fauvel, 1895)
- Platydracus biseriatus (Sharp, 1884)
- Platydracus bocandei (Fagel, 1951)
- Platydracus bodongi (Bernhauer, 1906)
- Platydracus bolivianus (Bernhauer, 1908)
- Platydracus borneensis Rougemont, 2015
- Platydracus brachycerus Smetana & Davies, 2000
- Platydracus bredoi (Fagel, 1950)
- Platydracus brevicornis (Motschulsky, 1861)
- Platydracus brevipennis Smetana & Davies, 2000
- Platydracus brincki (Scheerpeltz, 1974)
- Platydracus bruchi (Bernhauer, 1934)
- Platydracus bryanti (Cameron, 1918)
- Platydracus buquetii (Laporte de Castelnau, 1835)
- Platydracus burgeoni (Bernhauer, 1932)
- Platydracus caffer (Boheman, 1848)
- Platydracus caliginosus
- Platydracus campestris Coiffait, 1977
- Platydracus cantharophagus (Fagel, 1950)
- Platydracus castaneus (Nordmann, 1837)
- Platydracus catalonicus Coiffait, 1967
- Platydracus centralis (Sharp, 1884)
- Platydracus cerdo (Gerstaecker, 1867)
- Platydracus cervinipennis (G.Quedenfeldt, 1888)
- Platydracus chalcescens (Sharp, 1889)
- Platydracus chalceus (Bernhauer, 1911)
- Platydracus chalcocephalus (Fabricius, 1801)
- Platydracus championi (Sharp, 1884)
- Platydracus chinensis (Bernhauer, 1914)
- Platydracus chiriquensis (Sharp, 1884)
- Platydracus chrysaster (Erichson, 1839)
- Platydracus chrysis (Bernhauer, 1936)
- Platydracus chrysotrichopterus (Scheerpeltz, 1933)
- Platydracus cincticollis (Cameron, 1951)
- Platydracus cinnamopterus (Gravenhorst, 1802)
- Platydracus circumcinctus (Bernhauer, 1914)
- Platydracus coeruleipennis Coiffait, 1983
- Platydracus collaris Coiffait, 1977
- Platydracus comes (LeConte & J.L., 1863)
- Platydracus consularis (Bernhauer, 1915)
- Platydracus contiguus (Cameron, 1938)
- Platydracus cordilleranus (Bernhauer, 1917)
- Platydracus costaricensis (Bernhauer, 1917)
- Platydracus cribratipennis (É.Blanchard, 1842)
- Platydracus cupreicollis (Nordmann, 1837)
- Platydracus curticornis (Fauvel, 1895)
- Platydracus cyaneus (Sharp, 1884)
- Platydracus cyanomelas (Erichson, 1839)
- Platydracus darfourensis Levasseur, 1967
- Platydracus dauricus (Mannerheim, 1830)
- Platydracus decipiens (Kraatz, 1859)
- Platydracus demissus (G.Müller, 1925)
- Platydracus dimidiatus (Laporte de Castelnau, 1835)
- Platydracus discretus (Sharp, 1884)
- Platydracus dispersus (Fauvel, 1907)
- Platydracus dohertyi (Cameron, 1932)
- Platydracus donnyi Rougemont, 2015
- Platydracus drescheri (Cameron, 1937)
- Platydracus dudgeoni (Cameron, 1932)
- Platydracus emeritus (Herman, 2001)
- Platydracus erichsoni (Boheman, 1848)
- Platydracus ertli (Bernhauer, 1908)
- Platydracus erythrocnemus (Nordmann, 1837)
- Platydracus evansi (Bernhauer, 1936)
- Platydracus exulans (Erichson, 1839)
- Platydracus falcimaculatus (Bernhauer, 1937)
- Platydracus fassli (Bernhauer, 1908)
- Platydracus fauvelianus (Fagel, 1950)
- Platydracus fauvelides Newton, 2017
- Platydracus feae (Bernhauer, 1915)
- Platydracus femoratus (Fabricius, 1801)
- Platydracus ferox (Nordmann, 1837)
- Platydracus fervidus (Sharp, 1884)
- Platydracus flavopilosus (Cameron, 1932)
- Platydracus flavopunctatus (Latreille, 1804)
- Platydracus formosae (Bernhauer, 1933)
- Platydracus fossator (Gravenhorst, 1802) (red-spotted rove beetle)
- Platydracus fraternus (Bernhauer, 1915)
- Platydracus fulvipes (Scopoli, 1763)
- Platydracus fulvomaculatus (Nordmann, 1837)
- Platydracus funebris (Sharp, 1884)
- Platydracus fuscolineatus (Bernhauer, 1934)
- Platydracus fuscomaculatus (Laporte de Castelnau, 1835)
- Platydracus gabiruensis (Bernhauer, 1934)
- Platydracus gemmatus (Fauvel, 1895)
- Platydracus gentilis (Erichson, 1839)
- Platydracus gerardi (Bondroit, 1913)
- Platydracus giganteus (Kraatz, 1899)
- Platydracus girardi Levasseur, 1980
- Platydracus gmelini (Blackwelder, 1944)
- Platydracus goliathus (Bernhauer, 1912)
- Platydracus goryi (Laporte de Castelnau, 1835)
- Platydracus gracilipes (Sharp, 1884)
- Platydracus gratiosus (Sharp, 1876)
- Platydracus gratus (Sharp, 1876)
- Platydracus gravenhorsti (Blackwelder, 1944)
- Platydracus guineensis (Cameron, 1950)
- Platydracus hauserianus (Bernhauer, 1933)
- Platydracus hewitti (Bernhauer, 1914)
- Platydracus hypocrita (G.Müller, 1925)
- Platydracus immaculatus (Mannerheim, 1830)
- Platydracus imperatorius (Bernhauer, 1916)
- Platydracus impotens (Eppelsheim, 1889)
- Platydracus incognitus (Sharp, 1884)
- Platydracus inornatus (Sharp, 1874)
- Platydracus insolitus (Sharp, 1884)
- Platydracus insularis (Cameron, 1941)
- Platydracus iridiventris (Bernhauer, 1936)
- Platydracus iringanus (Bernhauer, 1937)
- Platydracus javanus (Bernhauer, 1934)
- Platydracus jeanneli (Chapman, 1939)
- Platydracus juang Smetana, 2005
- Platydracus kalisi (Bernhauer, 1934)
- Platydracus kamerunensis (Bernhauer, 1912)
- Platydracus kasyi (Scheerpeltz, 1962)
- Platydracus kiulungensis (Bernhauer, 1933)
- Platydracus kiushiuensis (Bernhauer, 1939)
- Platydracus kraatzi (Bernhauer, 1906)
- Platydracus krejcii (Coiffait, 1984)
- Platydracus kristenseni (Bernhauer, 1915)
- Platydracus lamottei Levasseur, 1967
- Platydracus lamtoensis Levasseur, 1967
- Platydracus langei (Bernhauer, 1904)
- Platydracus latebricola (Gravenhorst, 1806)
- Platydracus latecarinatus (Bernhauer, 1937)
- Platydracus latro (Erichson, 1839)
- Platydracus lecordieri Levasseur, 1980
- Platydracus lefevrei (Bernhauer, 1936)
- Platydracus leleupi Fagel, 1957
- Platydracus lewisi (Cameron, 1932)
- Platydracus lomii (Cerruti, 1951)
- Platydracus luzonicus (Fauvel, 1886)
- Platydracus maculicollis (Fauvel, 1895)
- Platydracus maculipennis (Kraatz, 1859)
- Platydracus maculosus (Gravenhorst, 1802)
- Platydracus marginatus (Cameron, 1944)
- Platydracus marmorellus (Fauvel, 1895)
- Platydracus masumotoi Y.Hayashi, 2011
- Platydracus mendicus (Sharp, 1884)
- Platydracus meridionalis (Rosenhauer, 1847)
- Platydracus methneri (Bernhauer, 1915)
- Platydracus methnerianus (Bernhauer, 1936)
- Platydracus mexicanus (Sharp, 1884)
- Platydracus mimeticus (Bernhauer, 1917)
- Platydracus mirandus (Bernhauer, 1934)
- Platydracus mongendensis (Bernhauer, 1929)
- Platydracus montanides Newton, 2015
- Platydracus montanus (Cameron, 1942)
- Platydracus mortuorum (Bernhauer, 1912)
- Platydracus muellerianus (Scheerpeltz, 1933)
- Platydracus musonoiensis Levasseur, 1967
- Platydracus mysticus (Erichson, 1840)
- Platydracus nepalensis (Scheerpeltz, 1976)
- Platydracus nigripennis (Cameron, 1941)
- Platydracus nigriventris (Boheman, 1848)
- Platydracus nobilis (Nordmann, 1837)
- Platydracus notativentris (Fauvel, 1905)
- Platydracus notatus (Solsky, 1872)
- Platydracus nudicollis (Sharp, 1887)
- Platydracus oblongopunctatus Rougemont, 2015
- Platydracus obsoleticornis (Bernhauer, 1911)
- Platydracus ochropygus (Nordmann, 1837)
- Platydracus oculosus Smetana & Davies, 2000
- Platydracus opaciceps (Scheerpeltz, 1976)
- Platydracus opacus (Roth, 1851)
- Platydracus optatus (Sharp, 1884)
- Platydracus orizabae (Bernhauer, 1917)
- Platydracus osculatii (Guérin-Méneville, 1855)
- Platydracus pallidipes (Bernhauer, 1917)
- Platydracus panamensis (Bernhauer & K.Schubert, 1914)
- Platydracus parviceps (Sharp, 1876)
- Platydracus parvulus Smetana & Davies, 2000
- Platydracus patricius (Bernhauer, 1915)
- Platydracus perniger (Scheerpeltz, 1976)
- Platydracus perreaui Coiffait, 1984
- Platydracus peyrierasi Jarrige, 1972
- Platydracus philippinus (Cameron, 1941)
- Platydracus phoenicurus (Nordmann, 1837)
- Platydracus pictus (Boheman, 1860)
- Platydracus pinorum (Casey, 1915)
- Platydracus plagiicollis (Fairmaire, 1891)
- Platydracus plebejus (Bernhauer, 1915)
- Platydracus praelongus (Mannerheim, 1830)
- Platydracus praetermissus Newton, 2011
- Platydracus prasinivariegatus (Bernhauer, 1921)
- Platydracus pratti (Scheerpeltz, 1962)
- Platydracus preangeranus (Cameron, 1937)
- Platydracus procerus (Gahan, 1893)
- Platydracus pseudopaganus (Bernhauer, 1914)
- Platydracus pulcherrimus (Bernhauer, 1915)
- Platydracus purpurascens (Cameron, 1920)
- Platydracus purpureoaureus (Bernhauer, 1915)
- Platydracus raffrayi (Fauvel, 1907)
- Platydracus reitterianus (Bernhauer, 1933)
- Platydracus rhodesianus (Cameron, 1951)
- Platydracus riojanus Hozman, 1977
- Platydracus ruandae (Bernhauer, 1934)
- Platydracus rufipennis (Cameron, 1930)
- Platydracus rufulus Rougemont, 2015
- Platydracus rugosipennis (K.Schubert, 1911)
- Platydracus rutilicauda (Horn, 1879)
- Platydracus sachalinensis (Matsumura, 1911)
- Platydracus sallaei (Sharp, 1884)
- Platydracus santacoffiensis Levasseur, 1968
- Platydracus scabrosus (Curtis, 1839)
- Platydracus schultzei (Bernhauer, 1915)
- Platydracus scriptus (Nordmann, 1837)
- Platydracus semiauratus (K.Schubert, 1911)
- Platydracus semicyaneus (Bernhauer, 1915)
- Platydracus semipurpureus (Kraatz, 1859)
- Platydracus semiviolaceus (Cameron, 1932)
- Platydracus semotus (Herman, 2001)
- Platydracus sepulchralis (Erichson, 1839)
- Platydracus sharpi (Fauvel, 1901)
- Platydracus sjostedti (Fauvel, 1903)
- Platydracus sladeae Rougemont, 2015
- Platydracus solwezianus (Cameron, 1951)
- Platydracus sparsus (Cameron, 1932)
- Platydracus speculifrons (Bernhauer, 1939)
- Platydracus stercorarius (Olivier & A.G., 1795)
- Platydracus subaeneipennis (Scheerpeltz, 1976)
- Platydracus subaeneus (Roth, 1851)
- Platydracus subauronotatus Coiffait, 1977
- Platydracus subchalceus (Cameron, 1930)
- Platydracus subirideus (Kraatz, 1859)
- Platydracus submarmorellus (K.Schubert, 1908)
- Platydracus subtilicornis Fagel, 1957
- Platydracus subviridis (Bernhauer, 1933)
- Platydracus sumakowi (Bernhauer, 1911)
- Platydracus surdus Fagel, 1957
- Platydracus suspectus (Fauvel, 1904)
- Platydracus suspiciosus (Cameron, 1937)
- Platydracus tanalensis (Fauvel, 1905)
- Platydracus tarsalis (Mannerheim, 1843)
- Platydracus temporalis (Casey, 1915)
- Platydracus tomentosus
- Platydracus toumodiensis Levasseur, 1967
- Platydracus trimaculatus (Fauvel, 1895)
- Platydracus uheheanus (Bernhauer, 1937)
- Platydracus ussuriensis (Solsky, 1871)
- Platydracus vestitus (Sharp, 1884)
- Platydracus vetustus (Sharp, 1876)
- Platydracus vicarius (Sharp, 1889)
- Platydracus villanuevai Rougemont, 2015
- Platydracus violaceovirens (Fauvel, 1905)
- Platydracus violaceus
- Platydracus virgulatus (Fauvel, 1895)
- Platydracus viridanus (Horn, 1879)
- Platydracus vittatus
- Platydracus vividus (Sharp, 1884)
- Platydracus weingaertneri (Bernhauer, 1927)
- Platydracus wittei (Fagel, 1950)
- Platydracus wittmeri Coiffait, 1977
- Platydracus yolensis (Cerruti, 1951)
- Platydracus yunnanensis (Bernhauer, 1933)
- Platydracus yunnanicus Smetana & Davies, 2000
- Platydracus zavattarii (Gridelli, 1939)
- Platydracus zonatus (Gravenhorst, 1802)
- † Platydracus breviantennatus Cai, Chenyang, Newton, Diying Huang & Liang Tang, 2014
