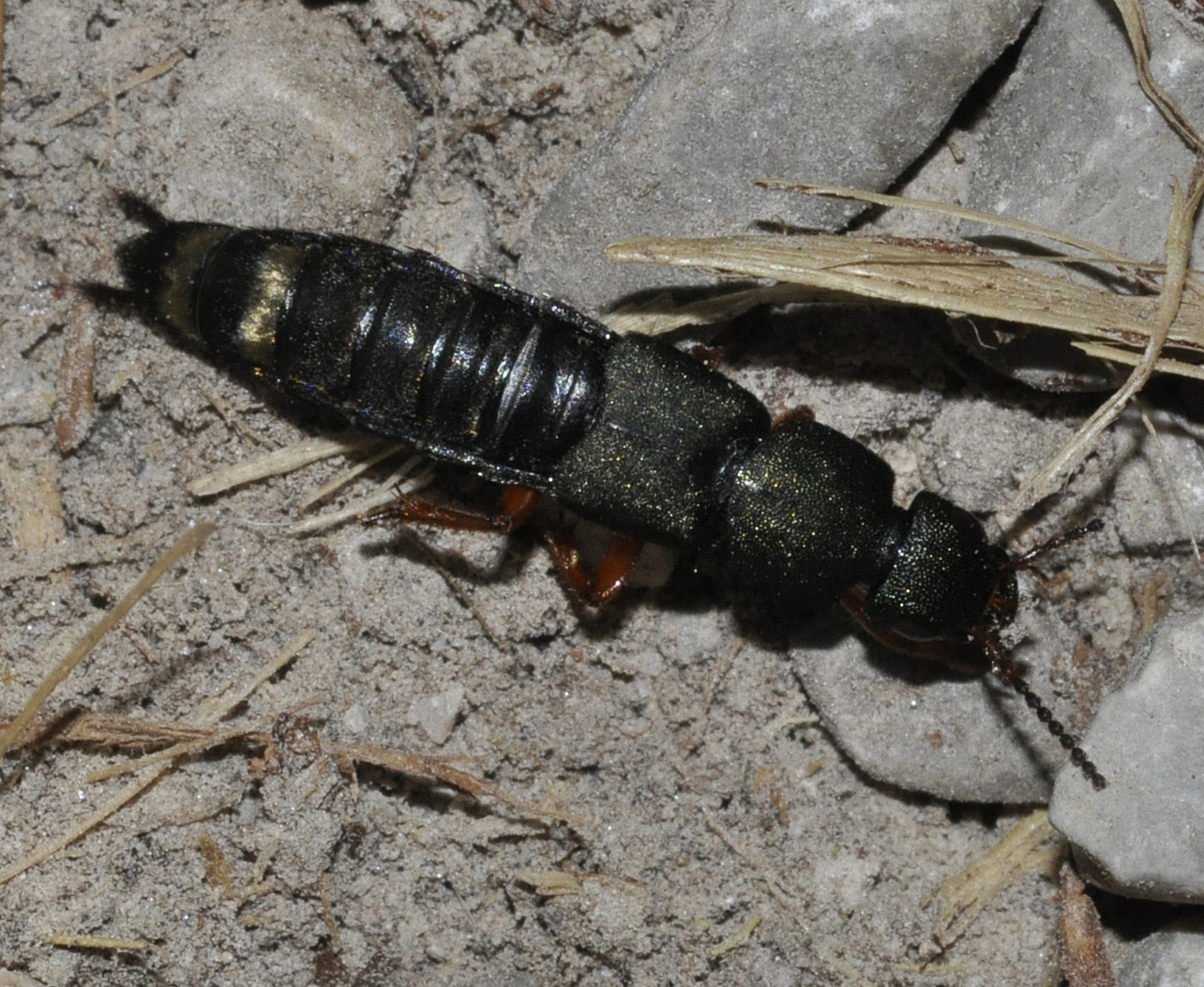
- Platydracus fulvipes

Scientific classification
- Kingdom: Animalia
- Phylum: Arthropoda
- Clade: Pancrustacea
- Class: Insecta
- Order: Coleoptera
- Suborder: Polyphaga
- Infraorder: Staphyliniformia
- Family: Staphylinidae
- Subfamily: Staphylininae
- Tribe: Staphylinini
- Subtribe: Staphylinina
- Genus: Platydracus; Thomson, 1858

Diversity
- at least 280 species

= Platydracus =

Genus of beetles

Platydracus is a genus of rove beetles in the family Staphylinidae. There are more than 280 described species in Platydracus.

The species of Platydracus were formerly classified in the genus Staphylinus.

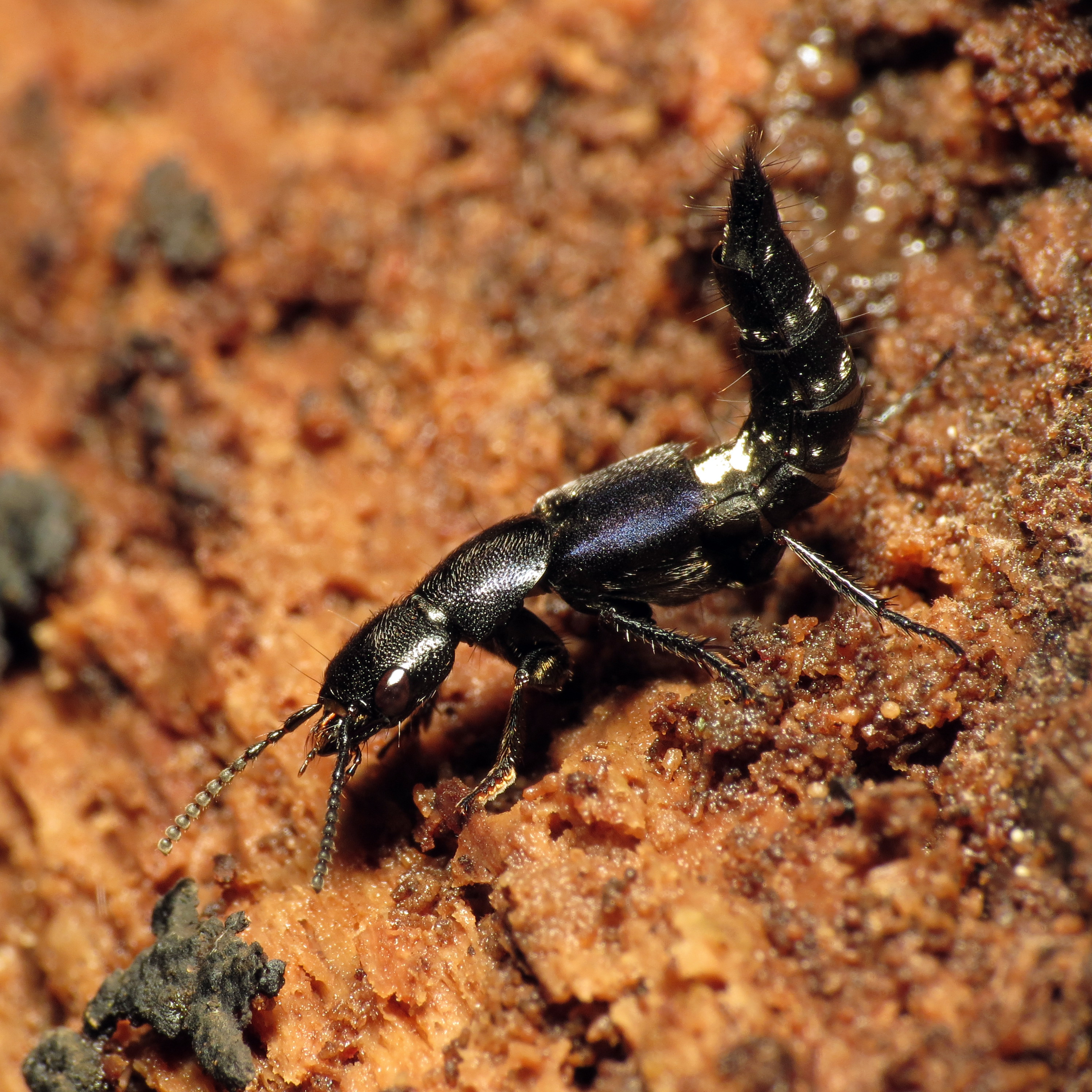
Platydracus violaceus

== See also ==
- List of Platydracus species
