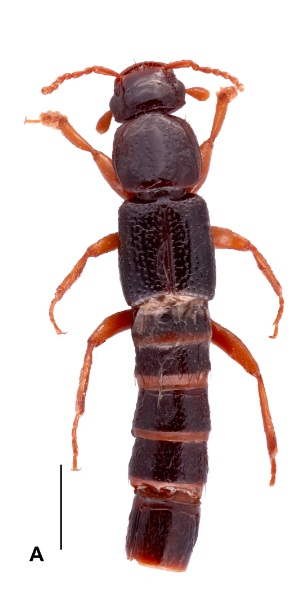

Scientific classification
- Kingdom: Animalia
- Phylum: Arthropoda
- Clade: Pancrustacea
- Class: Insecta
- Order: Coleoptera
- Suborder: Polyphaga
- Infraorder: Staphyliniformia
- Family: Staphylinidae
- Genus: Neolindus
- Species: N. parasinuatus

Binomial name
- Neolindus parasinuatus Guzman, Tokareva & Żyła, 2024

= Neolindus parasinuatus =

Species of beetle

Neolindus parasinuatus is a species of beetle in the family Staphylinidae. This species is known from the type locality in Colombia (Amazonas, Leticia, Parque Nacional Natural Amacayacu).

== Description ==
The whole body and appendages of the adults are brown.

== Etymology ==
The species name is a combination of Latin para (meaning similar or equal) and sinuatus as the name of the species described by Herman (1991), Neolindus sinuatus. It indicates the similarity of morphology between aedeagi of the two species.
