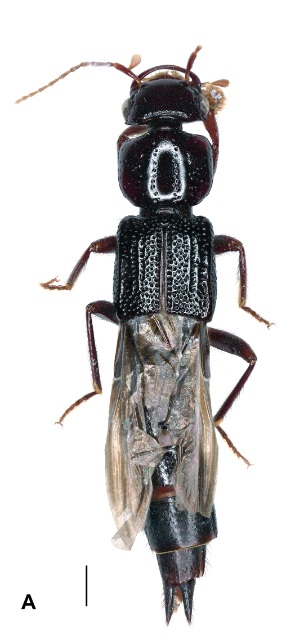

Scientific classification
- Kingdom: Animalia
- Phylum: Arthropoda
- Clade: Pancrustacea
- Class: Insecta
- Order: Coleoptera
- Suborder: Polyphaga
- Infraorder: Staphyliniformia
- Family: Staphylinidae
- Genus: Neolindus
- Species: N. parahermani

Binomial name
- Neolindus parahermani Guzman, Tokareva & Żyła, 2024

= Neolindus parahermani =

Species of beetle

Neolindus parahermani is a species of beetle of the family Staphylinidae. This species is known from the type locality in French Guiana (Roura, Réserve Naturelle Régionale Trésor).

== Description ==
Adults have a black head and pronotum, while the legs are dark brown and the abdomen is black. The intersegmental membrane is dark brown.

== Etymology ==
The species name is a combination of Latin para (meaning similar or equal) and hermani as the name of the species described by Asenjo (2011), Neolindus hermani. It indicates the similarity of morphology between aedeagi of the two species.
