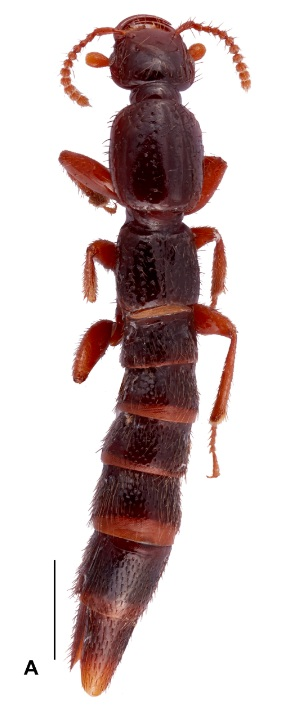

Scientific classification
- Kingdom: Animalia
- Phylum: Arthropoda
- Clade: Pancrustacea
- Class: Insecta
- Order: Coleoptera
- Suborder: Polyphaga
- Infraorder: Staphyliniformia
- Family: Staphylinidae
- Genus: Neolindus
- Species: N. paraplectrus

Binomial name
- Neolindus paraplectrus Guzman, Tokareva & Żyła, 2024

= Neolindus paraplectrus =

Species of beetle

Neolindus paraplectrus is a species of beetle in the family Staphylinidae. This species is known from the type locality in Venezuela (Mérida, Tabay).

== Description ==
Adults have a dark brown head and pronotum, while the legs are brown and the abdomen is dark brown.

== Etymology ==
The species name is a combination of Latin para (meaning similar or equal) and plectrus as the name of the species described by Herman (1991), Neolindus plectrus. It indicates the similarity of morphology between aedeagi of the two species.
