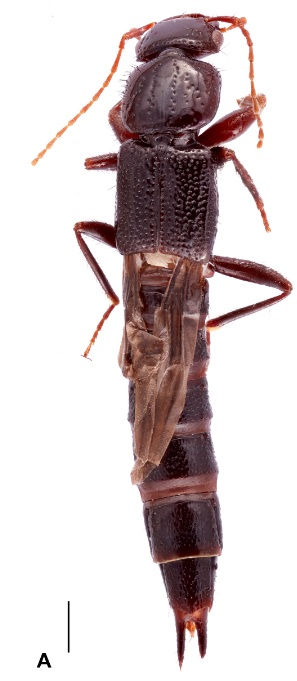

Scientific classification
- Kingdom: Animalia
- Phylum: Arthropoda
- Clade: Pancrustacea
- Class: Insecta
- Order: Coleoptera
- Suborder: Polyphaga
- Infraorder: Staphyliniformia
- Family: Staphylinidae
- Genus: Neolindus
- Species: N. parautriensis

Binomial name
- Neolindus parautriensis Guzman, Tokareva & Żyła, 2024

= Neolindus parautriensis =

Species of beetle

Neolindus parautriensis is a species of beetle in the family Staphylinidae. This species is known from the type locality in Panama (Colón, Chagres).

== Description ==
Adults have a dark brown head and pronotum. The antennae and maxillary palpi are light brown and the legs are brown and partially light brown. The meso- and metatibia are lighter than other parts of the respective legs and the abdomen is dark brown.

== Etymology ==
The species name is a combination of Latin para (meaning similar or equal) and utriensis as the name of the species Neolindus utriensis.
