= Neolindus brewsterae =

Scientific classification
- Kingdom: Animalia
- Phylum: Arthropoda
- Clade: Pancrustacea
- Class: Insecta
- Order: Coleoptera
- Suborder: Polyphaga
- Infraorder: Staphyliniformia
- Family: Staphylinidae
- Genus: Neolindus
- Species: N. brewsterae

Binomial name
- Neolindus brewsterae Herman, 1991

Species of beetle

Neolindus brewsterae is a species of beetle of the family Staphylinidae. This species is known from the lowlands of Bolivia and Brazil.

== Description ==
Adults reach a length of about 3.7 mm and are reddish brown, with the abdomen darker and the antennae and legs paler.

== Etymology ==
The species is named for Bea Brewster, the departmental secretary of the author.
