= Neolindus hamatus =

Scientific classification
- Kingdom: Animalia
- Phylum: Arthropoda
- Clade: Pancrustacea
- Class: Insecta
- Order: Coleoptera
- Suborder: Polyphaga
- Infraorder: Staphyliniformia
- Family: Staphylinidae
- Genus: Neolindus
- Species: N. hamatus

Binomial name
- Neolindus hamatus Herman, 1991

Species of beetle

Neolindus hamatus is a species of beetle of the family Staphylinidae. This species is known from Brazil.

== Description ==
Adults reach a length of about 4.8 mm and are reddish brown, with the antennae and legs paler.

== Etymology ==
The species name is derived from Latin hamatus (meaning hooked or with hooks) and refers to the hook-like projections on the apical portion of the aedeagus.
