= Neolindus prolatus =

Scientific classification
- Kingdom: Animalia
- Phylum: Arthropoda
- Clade: Pancrustacea
- Class: Insecta
- Order: Coleoptera
- Suborder: Polyphaga
- Infraorder: Staphyliniformia
- Family: Staphylinidae
- Genus: Neolindus
- Species: N. prolatus

Binomial name
- Neolindus prolatus Herman, 1991

Species of beetle

Neolindus prolatus is a species of beetle of the family Staphylinidae. This species is known from Ecuador.

== Description ==
Adults reach a length of about 4.6 mm and are dark reddish brown, with the abdomen darker. The antennae and legs are reddish brown to yellowish brown.

== Etymology ==
The species name is derived from Latin prolatus (meaning extended or elongated) and refers to the elongation of the apex of the aedeagus.
