= Neolindus hanagarthi =

Scientific classification
- Kingdom: Animalia
- Phylum: Arthropoda
- Clade: Pancrustacea
- Class: Insecta
- Order: Coleoptera
- Suborder: Polyphaga
- Infraorder: Staphyliniformia
- Family: Staphylinidae
- Genus: Neolindus
- Species: N. hanagarthi

Binomial name
- Neolindus hanagarthi Irmler, 1981

Species of beetle

Neolindus hanagarthi is a species of beetle of the family Staphylinidae. This species is known from Peru.

== Description ==
Adults reach a length of about 14 mm and have a reddish black head, prothorax and legs. The elytra are black. The first segment of the antennae is reddish black, while the remaining segments are yellowish brown.
