= Neolindus peruvianus =

Scientific classification
- Kingdom: Animalia
- Phylum: Arthropoda
- Clade: Pancrustacea
- Class: Insecta
- Order: Coleoptera
- Suborder: Polyphaga
- Infraorder: Staphyliniformia
- Family: Staphylinidae
- Genus: Neolindus
- Species: N. peruvianus

Binomial name
- Neolindus peruvianus Irmler, 1981

Species of beetle

Neolindus peruvianus is a species of beetle of the family Staphylinidae. This species is known from Peru. Described by German entomologist Ulrich Irmler in 1981 as one of five new species from the Peruvian Amazon region, it belongs to the Neotropical subtribe Cylindroxystina and is characterized by typical paederine traits such as an elongate body adapted for life in leaf litter.

== Description ==
Adults females reach a length of about 3.8 mm and are pale reddish brown, while the antennae and legs are yellowish brown. The general habitus is elongate and slender, embodying the classic rove beetle morphology of the family Staphylinidae, featuring short elytra that leave much of the abdomen exposed. Males are unknown.
