= Neolindus amazonicus =

Scientific classification
- Kingdom: Animalia
- Phylum: Arthropoda
- Clade: Pancrustacea
- Class: Insecta
- Order: Coleoptera
- Suborder: Polyphaga
- Infraorder: Staphyliniformia
- Family: Staphylinidae
- Genus: Neolindus
- Species: N. amazonicus

Binomial name
- Neolindus amazonicus Irmler, 1981

Species of beetle

Neolindus amazonicus is a species of beetle of the family Staphylinidae. This species is known from Peru.

== Description ==
Adults reach a length of about 6.1 mm and are reddish brown, while the antennae and legs are yellowish brown.
