= Neolindus dichymus =

Scientific classification
- Kingdom: Animalia
- Phylum: Arthropoda
- Clade: Pancrustacea
- Class: Insecta
- Order: Coleoptera
- Suborder: Polyphaga
- Infraorder: Staphyliniformia
- Family: Staphylinidae
- Genus: Neolindus
- Species: N. dichymus

Binomial name
- Neolindus dichymus Herman, 1991

Species of beetle

Neolindus dichymus is a species of beetle of the family Staphylinidae. This species is known from Ecuador.

== Description ==
Adults reach a length of about 6 mm and are reddish brown, with the elytra and abdomen darker and the antennae and legs paler.

== Etymology ==
The species name is derived from Greek di (meaning two) and kyma (meaning anything swollen) and refers to the pair of bosses on the lateral portion of the posterior margin of sternum VIII.
