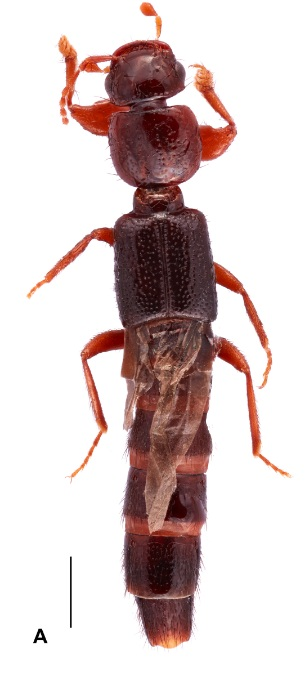

Scientific classification
- Kingdom: Animalia
- Phylum: Arthropoda
- Clade: Pancrustacea
- Class: Insecta
- Order: Coleoptera
- Suborder: Polyphaga
- Infraorder: Staphyliniformia
- Family: Staphylinidae
- Genus: Neolindus
- Species: N. bicornis

Binomial name
- Neolindus bicornis Guzman, Tokareva & Żyła, 2024

= Neolindus bicornis =

Species of beetle

Neolindus bicornis is a species of beetle of the Staphylinidae family. This species is known from the type locality in French Guiana (Cayenne, Roura) and the surrounding area.

== Description ==
Adults have a dark brown head. The pronotum is brown and the legs are light brown. The abdomen is brown.

== Etymology ==
The species name is a combination of the Latin prefix bi (meaning two) and the Latin word cornum (meaning a horn) and refers to the characteristic form of apical aedeagal sclerites.
