= Neolindus bullus =

Scientific classification
- Kingdom: Animalia
- Phylum: Arthropoda
- Clade: Pancrustacea
- Class: Insecta
- Order: Coleoptera
- Suborder: Polyphaga
- Infraorder: Staphyliniformia
- Family: Staphylinidae
- Genus: Neolindus
- Species: N. bullus

Binomial name
- Neolindus bullus Herman, 1991

Species of beetle

Neolindus bullus is a species of beetle of the family Staphylinidae. This species is known from Ecuador.

== Description ==
Adults reach a length of about 3.8 mm and are dark reddish brown, with the elytra darker and the antennae and legs paler.

== Etymology ==
The species name is derived from Latin bulla (meaning bubble, knob or boss) and refers to the pair of bumps on the apical portion of the ventral surface of the aedeagus.
