= Neolindus procarinatus =

Scientific classification
- Kingdom: Animalia
- Phylum: Arthropoda
- Clade: Pancrustacea
- Class: Insecta
- Order: Coleoptera
- Suborder: Polyphaga
- Infraorder: Staphyliniformia
- Family: Staphylinidae
- Genus: Neolindus
- Species: N. procarinatus

Binomial name
- Neolindus procarinatus Herman, 1991

Species of beetle

Neolindus procarinatus is a species of beetle of the family Staphylinidae. This species is known from Ecuador, French Guiana and Costa Rica.

== Description ==
Adults reach a length of about 6 mm and are reddish brown, with the elytra and abdomen darker. The antennae are yellowish brown.

== Etymology ==
The species name is derived from Latin pro (meaning before, forward or in front of) and carinatus (meaning keeled) and refers to the midlongitudinal carina on the anterior edge of the head.
