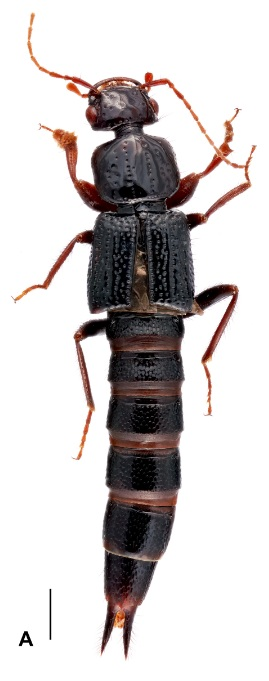

Scientific classification
- Kingdom: Animalia
- Phylum: Arthropoda
- Clade: Pancrustacea
- Class: Insecta
- Order: Coleoptera
- Suborder: Polyphaga
- Infraorder: Staphyliniformia
- Family: Staphylinidae
- Genus: Neolindus
- Species: N. niger

Binomial name
- Neolindus niger Guzman, Tokareva & Żyła, 2024

= Neolindus niger =

Species of beetle

Neolindus niger is a species of beetle in the family Staphylinidae. This species is known from the type locality in Costa Rica (Puntarenas, Rincon de Osa) and Corcovado National Park (Puntarenas).

== Description ==
Adults have a dark brown head, pronotum, coxa and femur, while the tibia and tarsomeres are light brown and the abdomen is dark brown.

== Etymology ==
The species name is derived from Latin niger (meaning shiny black) and refers to the colouration of specimens.
