= Neolindus densus =

Scientific classification
- Kingdom: Animalia
- Phylum: Arthropoda
- Clade: Pancrustacea
- Class: Insecta
- Order: Coleoptera
- Suborder: Polyphaga
- Infraorder: Staphyliniformia
- Family: Staphylinidae
- Genus: Neolindus
- Species: N. densus

Binomial name
- Neolindus densus Herman, 1991

Species of beetle

Neolindus densus is a species of beetle of the family Staphylinidae. This species is known from Brazil (Para, Amazonas) and Colombia.

== Description ==
Adults reach a length of about 4.5 mm.

== Etymology ==
The species name is derived from Latin densus (meaning thick or close) and refers to the dense cluster of setae on the apical portion of the male's eighth sternum.
