= Neolindus pastazae =

Scientific classification
- Kingdom: Animalia
- Phylum: Arthropoda
- Clade: Pancrustacea
- Class: Insecta
- Order: Coleoptera
- Suborder: Polyphaga
- Infraorder: Staphyliniformia
- Family: Staphylinidae
- Genus: Neolindus
- Species: N. pastazae

Binomial name
- Neolindus pastazae Irmler, 2011

Species of beetle

Neolindus pastazae is a species of beetle of the family Staphylinidae. This species is known from Ecuador.

== Description ==
Adults reach a length of about 10.5 mm and are brown, although the antennae, palpae and legs are yellow.

== Etymology ==
The species name refers to the location in the valley of the Rio Pastaza where it was found.
