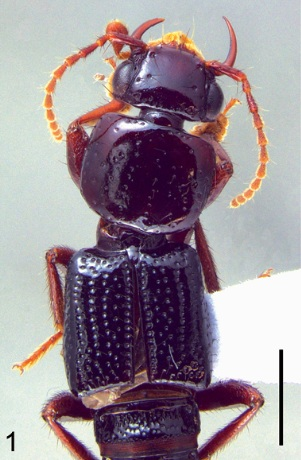

Scientific classification
- Kingdom: Animalia
- Phylum: Arthropoda
- Clade: Pancrustacea
- Class: Insecta
- Order: Coleoptera
- Suborder: Polyphaga
- Infraorder: Staphyliniformia
- Family: Staphylinidae
- Genus: Neolindus
- Species: N. irmleri

Binomial name
- Neolindus irmleri Asenjo, 2011

= Neolindus irmleri =

Species of beetle

Neolindus irmleri is a species of beetle of the family Staphylinidae. This species is known from French Guiana.

== Description ==
Adults are dark brown. The mandibles, femora and tibiae are dark reddish brown and the antennal segments 1–3 are dark reddish brown, while segments 4–11 and all tarsi are paler.

== Etymology ==
The species is named in honour of Dr. Ulrich Irmler of the Institute of Ecosystem Research, Germany.
