= Neolindus brachiatus =

Scientific classification
- Kingdom: Animalia
- Phylum: Arthropoda
- Clade: Pancrustacea
- Class: Insecta
- Order: Coleoptera
- Suborder: Polyphaga
- Infraorder: Staphyliniformia
- Family: Staphylinidae
- Genus: Neolindus
- Species: N. brachiatus

Binomial name
- Neolindus brachiatus Herman, 1991

Species of beetle

Neolindus brachiatus is a species of beetle of the family Staphylinidae. This species is known from Venezuela.

== Description ==
Adults reach a length of about 4-5 mm and are reddish brown, with the elytra and abdomen darker and the antennae and legs yellowish brown.

== Etymology ==
The species name is derived from Latin brachiatus (meaning with arms) and refers to the two processes or arms at the apex of the aedeagus.
