= Neolindus punctiventris =

Scientific classification
- Kingdom: Animalia
- Phylum: Arthropoda
- Clade: Pancrustacea
- Class: Insecta
- Order: Coleoptera
- Suborder: Polyphaga
- Infraorder: Staphyliniformia
- Family: Staphylinidae
- Genus: Neolindus
- Species: N. punctiventris

Binomial name
- Neolindus punctiventris Irmler, 1981

Species of beetle

Neolindus punctiventris is a species of beetle of the family Staphylinidae. This species is known from Peru.

== Description ==
Adults reach a length of about 5.5 mm and are reddish brown, with the abdomen darker and antennae and legs paler.
