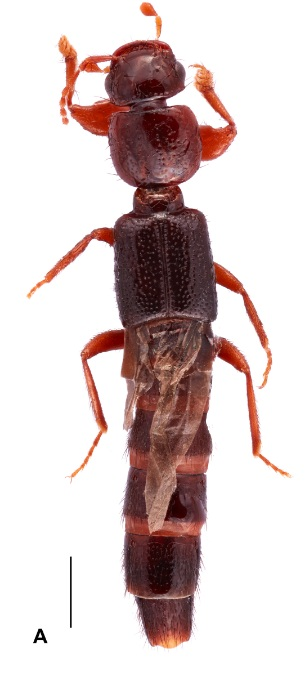
- Neolindus bicornis

Scientific classification
- Kingdom: Animalia
- Phylum: Arthropoda
- Class: Insecta
- Order: Coleoptera
- Suborder: Polyphaga
- Infraorder: Staphyliniformia
- Family: Staphylinidae
- Subfamily: Paederinae
- Tribe: Lathrobiini
- Subtribe: Cylindroxystina
- Genus: Neolindus; Scheerpeltz, 1933

Synonyms
- Lindus Sharp, 1876 [preoccupied]

= Neolindus =

Genus of beetles

Neolindus is a genus of beetles belonging to the family Staphylinidae.

== Species ==
- Neolindus agilis Herman, 1991
- Neolindus amazonicus Irmler, 1981
- Neolindus apiculus Herman, 1991
- Neolindus basisinuatus Herman, 1991
- Neolindus bicornis Guzman, Tokareva & Żyła, 2024
- Neolindus bidens Herman, 1991
- Neolindus brachiatus Herman, 1991
- Neolindus brewsterae Herman, 1991
- Neolindus bullus Herman, 1991
- Neolindus campbelli Herman, 1991
- Neolindus cephalochymus Herman, 1991
- Neolindus cuneatus Herman, 1991
- Neolindus densus Herman, 1991
- Neolindus dichymus Herman, 1991
- Neolindus elegans Guzman, Tokareva & Żyła, 2024
- Neolindus hamatus Herman, 1991
- Neolindus hanagarthi Irmler, 1981
- Neolindus hermani Asenjo, 2011
- Neolindus incanalis Herman, 1991
- Neolindus irmleri Asenjo, 2011
- Neolindus lirellus Herman, 1991
- Neolindus lodhii Herman, 1991
- Neolindus longithorax Guzman, Tokareva & Żyła, 2024
- Neolindus luxipenis Guzman, Tokareva & Żyła, 2024
- Neolindus maya Guzman, Tokareva & Żyła, 2024
- Neolindus milleri Herman, 1991
- Neolindus minutus Guzman, Tokareva & Żyła, 2024
- Neolindus napo Guzman, Tokareva & Żyła, 2024
- Neolindus niger Guzman, Tokareva & Żyła, 2024
- Neolindus ornatus Guzman, Tokareva & Żyła, 2024
- Neolindus parahermani Guzman, Tokareva & Żyła, 2024
- Neolindus parallelus Herman, 1991
- Neolindus paraplectrus Guzman, Tokareva & Żyła, 2024
- Neolindus parasinuatus Guzman, Tokareva & Żyła, 2024
- Neolindus parautriensis Guzman, Tokareva & Żyła, 2024
- Neolindus pastazae Irmler, 2011
- Neolindus peruvianus Irmler, 1981
- Neolindus plectrus Herman, 1991
- Neolindus procarinatus Herman, 1991
- Neolindus prolatus Herman, 1991
- Neolindus pseudosensillaris Guzman, Tokareva & Żyła, 2024
- Neolindus pumicosus Herman, 1991
- Neolindus punctiventris Irmler, 1981
- Neolindus punctogularis Herman, 1991
- Neolindus religans (Sharp, 1876)
- Neolindus retusus Herman, 1991
- Neolindus rudiculus Herman, 1991
- Neolindus sauron Guzman, Tokareva & Żyła, 2024
- Neolindus schubarti Irmler, 1981
- Neolindus sibyllae Guzman, Tokareva & Żyła, 2024
- Neolindus sinuatus Herman, 1991
- Neolindus triangularis Guzman, Tokareva & Żyła, 2024
- Neolindus tropicalis Guzman, Tokareva & Żyła, 2024
- Neolindus unilobus Herman, 1991
- Neolindus utriensis Guzman, Tokareva & Żyła, 2024
- Neolindus verhaaghi Irmler, 2011
- Neolindus volkeri Guzman, Tokareva & Żyła, 2024
- Neolindus yotokae Guzman, Tokareva & Żyła, 2024
