= Neolindus cephalochymus =

Scientific classification
- Kingdom: Animalia
- Phylum: Arthropoda
- Clade: Pancrustacea
- Class: Insecta
- Order: Coleoptera
- Suborder: Polyphaga
- Infraorder: Staphyliniformia
- Family: Staphylinidae
- Genus: Neolindus
- Species: N. cephalochymus

Binomial name
- Neolindus cephalochymus Herman, 1991

Species of beetle

Neolindus cephalochymus is a species of beetle of the family Staphylinidae. This species is known from Peru.

== Etymology ==
The species name is derived from Greek kephale (meaning head) and kyma (meaning anything swollen) and refers to the tumescence on the anterior portion of the head between the antennal insertions.
