= Neolindus lodhii =

Scientific classification
- Kingdom: Animalia
- Phylum: Arthropoda
- Clade: Pancrustacea
- Class: Insecta
- Order: Coleoptera
- Suborder: Polyphaga
- Infraorder: Staphyliniformia
- Family: Staphylinidae
- Genus: Neolindus
- Species: N. lodhii

Binomial name
- Neolindus lodhii Herman, 1991

Species of beetle

Neolindus lodhii is a species of beetle of the family Staphylinidae. This species is known from eastern Brazil, French Guiana and Suriname.

== Description ==
Adults reach a length of about 6 mm and are reddish brown, while the antennae and legs are paler.

== Etymology ==
The species is named in honour of Sarfraz Lodhi who has assisted the work of the author with the collection at the American Museum.
