= Neolindus basisinuatus =

Scientific classification
- Kingdom: Animalia
- Phylum: Arthropoda
- Clade: Pancrustacea
- Class: Insecta
- Order: Coleoptera
- Suborder: Polyphaga
- Infraorder: Staphyliniformia
- Family: Staphylinidae
- Genus: Neolindus
- Species: N. basisinuatus

Binomial name
- Neolindus basisinuatus Herman, 1991

Species of beetle

Neolindus basisinuatus is a species of beetle of the family Staphylinidae. This species is known from the Panama and Costa Rica.

== Description ==
Adults reach a length of about 6.1 mm and are reddish brown, while the elytra are darker and the antennae and legs are paler.

== Etymology ==
The species name is derived from Latin basis (meaning bottom) and sinuatus (meaning bend or curve) and refers to the form of the basal margin of the emargination of the posterior margin of sternum VIII.
