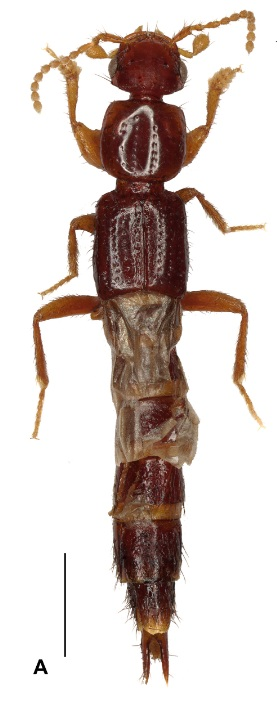

Scientific classification
- Kingdom: Animalia
- Phylum: Arthropoda
- Clade: Pancrustacea
- Class: Insecta
- Order: Coleoptera
- Suborder: Polyphaga
- Infraorder: Staphyliniformia
- Family: Staphylinidae
- Genus: Neolindus
- Species: N. tropicalis

Binomial name
- Neolindus tropicalis Guzman, Tokareva & Żyła, 2024

= Neolindus tropicalis =

Species of beetle

Neolindus tropicalis is a species of beetle of the family Staphylinidae. This species is known from the type locality in Brazil (Amazonas, Manaus, Reserva Florestal Adolpho Ducke).

== Description ==
Adults have a dark brown head and pronotum, while the legs are light brown and the abdomen is dark brown.

== Etymology ==
The species name is derived from Latin tropicus (meaning tropics) and refers to the fact that the type locality is in tropical Brazil.
