= Neolindus unilobus =

Scientific classification
- Kingdom: Animalia
- Phylum: Arthropoda
- Clade: Pancrustacea
- Class: Insecta
- Order: Coleoptera
- Suborder: Polyphaga
- Infraorder: Staphyliniformia
- Family: Staphylinidae
- Genus: Neolindus
- Species: N. unilobus

Binomial name
- Neolindus unilobus Herman, 1991

Species of beetle

Neolindus unilobus is a species of beetle of the family Staphylinidae. This species is known from Brazil.

== Description ==
Adults reach a length of about 6 mm and are reddish brown.

== Etymology ==
The species name is derived from Latin unus (meaning one) and lobus (meaning a rounded projection) and refers to the lobe on the posterior margin of tergum VIII.
