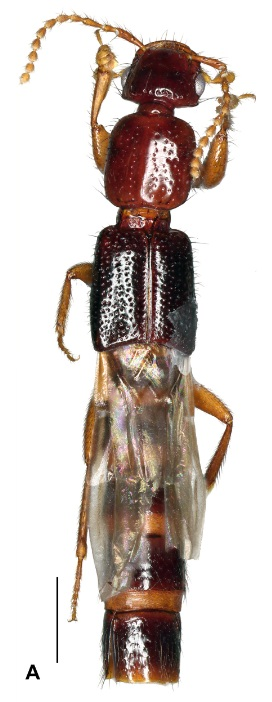

Scientific classification
- Kingdom: Animalia
- Phylum: Arthropoda
- Clade: Pancrustacea
- Class: Insecta
- Order: Coleoptera
- Suborder: Polyphaga
- Infraorder: Staphyliniformia
- Family: Staphylinidae
- Genus: Neolindus
- Species: N. longithorax

Binomial name
- Neolindus longithorax Guzman, Tokareva & Żyła, 2024

= Neolindus longithorax =

Species of beetle

Neolindus longithorax is a species of beetle in the family Staphylinidae. This species is known from the type locality in French Guiana (Saint-Laurent-du-Maroni, Saül, Mont Galbao).

== Description ==
Adults have a brown head and a light brown pronotum. The legs are brown and the elytra is dark brown. The abdomen is brown.

== Etymology ==
The species name is a combination of Latin words longus (meaning long) and thorax as an anatomical part of an insect and refers to relatively long thorax of this species.
