= Neolindus punctogularis =

Scientific classification
- Kingdom: Animalia
- Phylum: Arthropoda
- Clade: Pancrustacea
- Class: Insecta
- Order: Coleoptera
- Suborder: Polyphaga
- Infraorder: Staphyliniformia
- Family: Staphylinidae
- Genus: Neolindus
- Species: N. punctogularis

Binomial name
- Neolindus punctogularis Herman, 1991

Species of beetle

Neolindus punctogularis is a species of beetle of the family Staphylinidae. This species is known from Panama, Nicaragua and Costa Rica.

== Description ==
Adults reach a length of about 12.6 mm. Their head and prothorax are reddish, while the elytra and abdomen are black with reddish infusions. The first segment of the antennae is reddish, while the remaining segments are pale reddish brown.

== Etymology ==
The species name is derived from Latin punctura (meaning hole or prick) and gula (meaning gullet or throat) and refers to the transverse row of dense punctation on the anterior portion of the gula.
