= Neolindus pumicosus =

Scientific classification
- Kingdom: Animalia
- Phylum: Arthropoda
- Clade: Pancrustacea
- Class: Insecta
- Order: Coleoptera
- Suborder: Polyphaga
- Infraorder: Staphyliniformia
- Family: Staphylinidae
- Genus: Neolindus
- Species: N. pumicosus

Binomial name
- Neolindus pumicosus Herman, 1991

Species of beetle

Neolindus pumicosus is a species of beetle of the family Staphylinidae. This species is known from Colombia.

== Description ==
Adults reach a length of about 9-10 mm and are dark reddish brown, although the antennae and legs are reddish brown.

== Etymology ==
The species name is derived from Latin pumicosus (meaning porous) and refers to the dense punctulation of the dorsal surface of the head.
