= Neolindus religans =

Scientific classification
- Kingdom: Animalia
- Phylum: Arthropoda
- Clade: Pancrustacea
- Class: Insecta
- Order: Coleoptera
- Suborder: Polyphaga
- Infraorder: Staphyliniformia
- Family: Staphylinidae
- Genus: Neolindus
- Species: N. religans

Binomial name
- Neolindus religans (Sharp, 1876)

Synonyms
- Lindus religans Sharp, 1876

Species of beetle

Neolindus religans is a species of beetle of the family Staphylinidae. This species is known from Brazil.

== Description ==
Adults reach a length of about 6.5 mm and are pale to dark reddish brown, with the legs and antennae pale reddish brown to yellowish brown.
