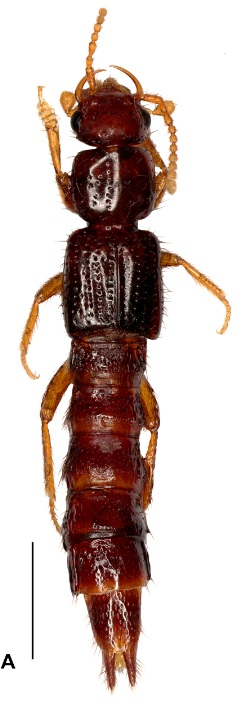

Scientific classification
- Kingdom: Animalia
- Phylum: Arthropoda
- Clade: Pancrustacea
- Class: Insecta
- Order: Coleoptera
- Suborder: Polyphaga
- Infraorder: Staphyliniformia
- Family: Staphylinidae
- Genus: Neolindus
- Species: N. pseudosensillaris

Binomial name
- Neolindus pseudosensillaris Guzman, Tokareva & Żyła, 2024

= Neolindus pseudosensillaris =

Species of beetle

Neolindus pseudosensillaris is a species of beetle of the family Staphylinidae. This species is known from the type locality in Brazil (Amazonas, Manaus, Projeto Dinâmica Biológica de Fragmentos Florestais reserve) and nearby Reserva Florestal Adolpho Ducke.

== Description ==
Adults have a dark brown head and pronotum, while the legs are light brown and the abdomen is brown.

== Etymology ==
The species name is a combination of Latin pseudo (meaning false) and sensillum (a diminutive of Latin sensus, meaning perception, feeling) and refers to the three sensilla-like structures on the head of unknown origin.
