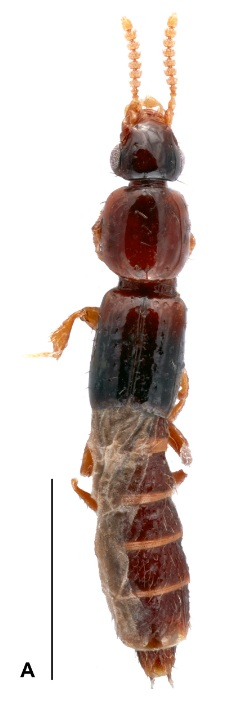

Scientific classification
- Kingdom: Animalia
- Phylum: Arthropoda
- Clade: Pancrustacea
- Class: Insecta
- Order: Coleoptera
- Suborder: Polyphaga
- Infraorder: Staphyliniformia
- Family: Staphylinidae
- Genus: Neolindus
- Species: N. minutus

Binomial name
- Neolindus minutus Guzman, Tokareva & Żyła, 2024

= Neolindus minutus =

Species of beetle

Neolindus minutus is a species of beetle in the family Staphylinidae. This species is found in Guyana, Ecuador, French Guiana, Nicaragua and Peru.

== Description ==
Adults have a brown head and pronotum, while the legs are light brown and the abdomen is brown.

== Etymology ==
The species name is derived from Latin minutus (meaning very small, little, minute) and refers the noticeably smaller size of this species of Neolindus compared with others.
