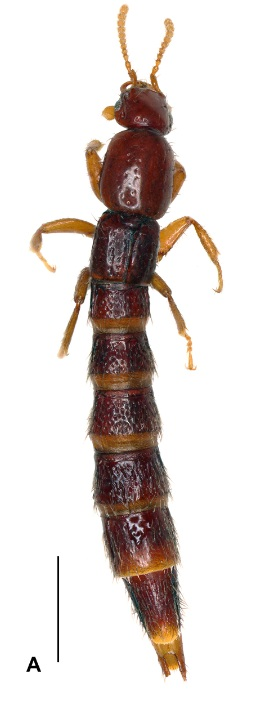

Scientific classification
- Kingdom: Animalia
- Phylum: Arthropoda
- Clade: Pancrustacea
- Class: Insecta
- Order: Coleoptera
- Suborder: Polyphaga
- Infraorder: Staphyliniformia
- Family: Staphylinidae
- Genus: Neolindus
- Species: N. yotokae

Binomial name
- Neolindus yotokae Guzman, Tokareva & Żyła, 2024

= Neolindus yotokae =

Species of beetle

Neolindus yotokae is a species of beetle of the family Staphylinidae. This species is known from the type locality in Venezuela (Aragua, Rancho Grande Biological Station).

== Description ==
Adults have a brown head and pronotum, while the legs are light brown and the abdomen is brown.

== Etymology ==
The species is named in honour of Dr Karla Yotoko, evolutionary biologist, and Camilo Guzman's PhD advisor.
