= Neolindus rudiculus =

Scientific classification
- Kingdom: Animalia
- Phylum: Arthropoda
- Clade: Pancrustacea
- Class: Insecta
- Order: Coleoptera
- Suborder: Polyphaga
- Infraorder: Staphyliniformia
- Family: Staphylinidae
- Genus: Neolindus
- Species: N. rudiculus

Binomial name
- Neolindus rudiculus Herman, 1991

Species of beetle

Neolindus rudiculus is a species of beetle of the family Staphylinidae. This species is known from Venezuela.

== Description ==
Adults reach a length of about 4.5 mm and are reddish brown, while the antennae and legs are yellowish brown.

== Etymology ==
The species name is derived from Latin rudicula (meaning wooden spoon or spatula) and refers to the form of the apical portion of the aedeagus.
