= Neolindus milleri =

Scientific classification
- Kingdom: Animalia
- Phylum: Arthropoda
- Clade: Pancrustacea
- Class: Insecta
- Order: Coleoptera
- Suborder: Polyphaga
- Infraorder: Staphyliniformia
- Family: Staphylinidae
- Genus: Neolindus
- Species: N. milleri

Binomial name
- Neolindus milleri Herman, 1991

Species of beetle

Neolindus milleri is a species of beetle of the family Staphylinidae. This species is known from Ecuador.

== Description ==
Adults reach a length of about 5.5 mm and are reddish brown, with the antennae and legs paler.

== Etymology ==
The species is named for a friend of the author, Jim Miller, with whom he was travelling at the time he the species.
