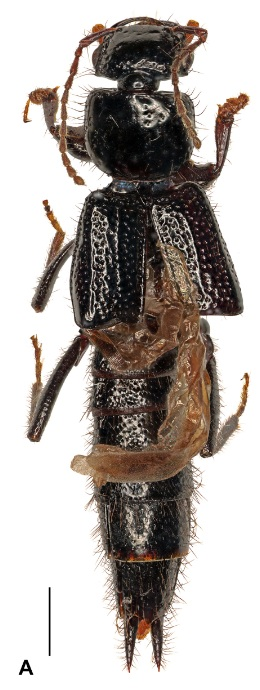

Scientific classification
- Kingdom: Animalia
- Phylum: Arthropoda
- Clade: Pancrustacea
- Class: Insecta
- Order: Coleoptera
- Suborder: Polyphaga
- Infraorder: Staphyliniformia
- Family: Staphylinidae
- Genus: Neolindus
- Species: N. maya

Binomial name
- Neolindus maya Guzman, Tokareva & Żyła, 2024

= Neolindus maya =

Species of beetle

Neolindus maya is a species of beetle in the family Staphylinidae. This species is known from the type locality in Mexico (Chiapas, Laguna Naja).

== Description ==
Adults have a shiny black body and appendages.

== Etymology ==
The species name honours the Maya communities that inhabit the type locality in Mexico.
