= Neolindus campbelli =

Scientific classification
- Kingdom: Animalia
- Phylum: Arthropoda
- Clade: Pancrustacea
- Class: Insecta
- Order: Coleoptera
- Suborder: Polyphaga
- Infraorder: Staphyliniformia
- Family: Staphylinidae
- Genus: Neolindus
- Species: N. campbelli

Binomial name
- Neolindus campbelli Herman, 1991

Species of beetle

Neolindus campbelli is a species of beetle of the family Staphylinidae. This species is known from Panama and Costa Rica.

== Description ==
Adults reach a length of about 11 mm and are dark reddish brown, while the elytra and abdomen are nearly black and the antenna and legs are paler.

== Etymology ==
The species is named in honour of J. Milton Campbell, who collected the type series.
