= Neolindus lirellus =

Scientific classification
- Kingdom: Animalia
- Phylum: Arthropoda
- Clade: Pancrustacea
- Class: Insecta
- Order: Coleoptera
- Suborder: Polyphaga
- Infraorder: Staphyliniformia
- Family: Staphylinidae
- Genus: Neolindus
- Species: N. lirellus

Binomial name
- Neolindus lirellus Herman, 1991

Species of beetle

Neolindus lirellus is a species of beetle of the family Staphylinidae. This species is known from Ecuador.

== Description ==
Adults reach a length of about 4.7 mm and are reddish brown, while the elytra and abdomen are dark reddish brown and the antennae and legs are pale reddish brown to yellowish brown.

== Etymology ==
The species name is derived from Latin lira (meaning earth or ridge thrown up by the plow) and refers to the furrow on the ventral surface of sternum VIII of the male near the incision of the posterior margin.
