= Neolindus cuneatus =

Scientific classification
- Kingdom: Animalia
- Phylum: Arthropoda
- Clade: Pancrustacea
- Class: Insecta
- Order: Coleoptera
- Suborder: Polyphaga
- Infraorder: Staphyliniformia
- Family: Staphylinidae
- Genus: Neolindus
- Species: N. cuneatus

Binomial name
- Neolindus cuneatus Herman, 1991

Species of beetle

Neolindus cuneatus is a species of beetle of the family Staphylinidae. This species is known from the Panama and Costa Rica.

== Description ==
Adults reach a length of about 4.5 mm and are dark reddish brown, while the antennae and legs are paler.

== Etymology ==
The species name is derived from Latin cuneatus (meaning wedge shaped) and refers to the form of the emargination of the posterior margin of sternum VIII.
