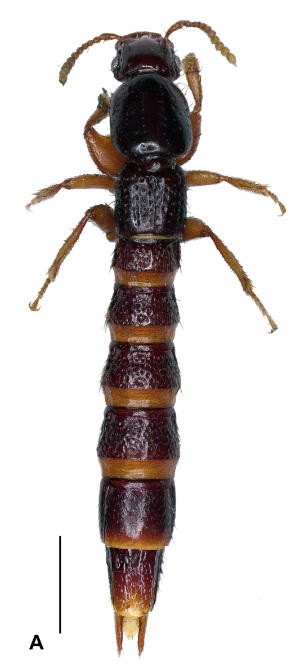

Scientific classification
- Kingdom: Animalia
- Phylum: Arthropoda
- Clade: Pancrustacea
- Class: Insecta
- Order: Coleoptera
- Suborder: Polyphaga
- Infraorder: Staphyliniformia
- Family: Staphylinidae
- Genus: Neolindus
- Species: N. sibyllae

Binomial name
- Neolindus sibyllae Guzman, Tokareva & Żyła, 2024

= Neolindus sibyllae =

Species of beetle

Neolindus sibyllae is a species of beetle of the family Staphylinidae. This species is known from the type locality in Venezuela (Tachira, San Cristobal, Parque Nacional Chorro El Indio).

== Description ==
Adults have a brown head and pronotum, while the legs are light brown and the abdomen is brown.

== Etymology ==
The species is named in honour of Maria Sibylla Merian, a German entomologist, naturalist and scientific illustrator.
