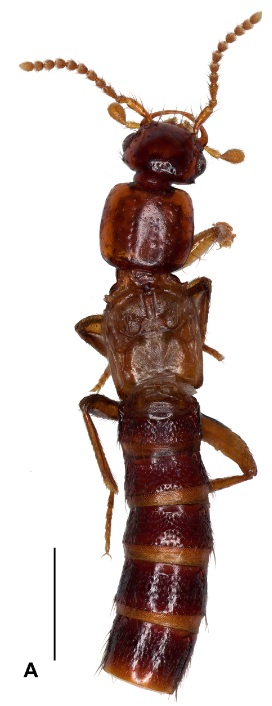

Scientific classification
- Kingdom: Animalia
- Phylum: Arthropoda
- Clade: Pancrustacea
- Class: Insecta
- Order: Coleoptera
- Suborder: Polyphaga
- Infraorder: Staphyliniformia
- Family: Staphylinidae
- Genus: Neolindus
- Species: N. luxipenis

Binomial name
- Neolindus luxipenis Guzman, Tokareva & Żyła, 2024

= Neolindus luxipenis =

Species of beetle

Neolindus luxipenis is a species of beetle in the family Staphylinidae. This species is known from the type locality in Bolivia (Cochabamba, Cochabamba, Valle de Sajta Biological Station).

== Description ==
Adults have a brown head and pronotum, while the coxa, femur and tibia are brown and the tarsomeres are light brown. The abdomen is brown.

== Etymology ==
The species name is a combination of the Latin words luxus (meaning luxury or extravagant) and penis which addresses the aedeagus here. It refers to an elaborate structure of the aedeagus in the species.
