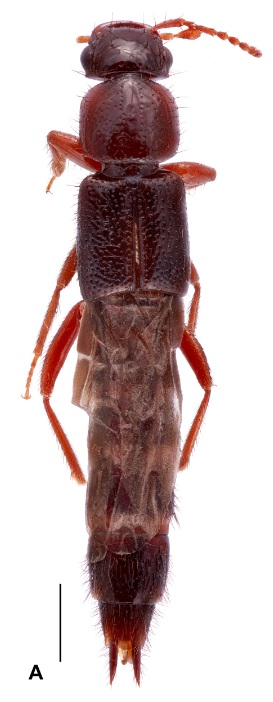

Scientific classification
- Kingdom: Animalia
- Phylum: Arthropoda
- Clade: Pancrustacea
- Class: Insecta
- Order: Coleoptera
- Suborder: Polyphaga
- Infraorder: Staphyliniformia
- Family: Staphylinidae
- Genus: Neolindus
- Species: N. triangularis

Binomial name
- Neolindus triangularis Guzman, Tokareva & Żyła, 2024

= Neolindus triangularis =

Species of beetle

Neolindus triangularis is a species of beetle of the family Staphylinidae. This species is known from the type locality in French Guiana (Saint-Laurent-du-Maroni, Saül, Monts La Fumée), the surrounding forest, and an area around 130 km south-east from the type locality (Cayenne, Matoury).

== Description ==
Adults have a brown head and pronotum, while the legs are light brown and the abdomen is brown.

== Etymology ==
The species name is derived from Latin triangulus (meaning a triangle) and refers to the form of the median lobe of the aedeagus.
