= Neolindus agilis =

Scientific classification
- Kingdom: Animalia
- Phylum: Arthropoda
- Clade: Pancrustacea
- Class: Insecta
- Order: Coleoptera
- Suborder: Polyphaga
- Infraorder: Staphyliniformia
- Family: Staphylinidae
- Genus: Neolindus
- Species: N. agilis

Binomial name
- Neolindus agilis Herman, 1991

Species of beetle

Neolindus agilis is a species of beetle of the family Staphylinidae. This species is known from Brazil and Bolivia.

== Description ==
Adults reach a length of 4.3-4.6 mm and are reddish brown, with a darker elytra, while the antennae and legs are paler.

== Etymology ==
The species name is derived from Latin agilis (meaning quick, light, nimble or agile).
