= Neolindus retusus =

Scientific classification
- Kingdom: Animalia
- Phylum: Arthropoda
- Clade: Pancrustacea
- Class: Insecta
- Order: Coleoptera
- Suborder: Polyphaga
- Infraorder: Staphyliniformia
- Family: Staphylinidae
- Genus: Neolindus
- Species: N. retusus

Binomial name
- Neolindus retusus Herman, 1991

Species of beetle

Neolindus retusus is a species of beetle of the family Staphylinidae. This species is known from Ecuador, Bolivia, Peru and Costa Rica.

== Description ==
Adults reach a length of about 9.5 mm and are dark reddish brown, while the abdomen is darker. The antennae and legs are reddish brown.

== Etymology ==
The species name is derived from Latin retusus (meaning notched) and refers to the notch of the apical margin of the posterior margin of tergum VIII.
