= Neolindus apiculus =

Scientific classification
- Kingdom: Animalia
- Phylum: Arthropoda
- Clade: Pancrustacea
- Class: Insecta
- Order: Coleoptera
- Suborder: Polyphaga
- Infraorder: Staphyliniformia
- Family: Staphylinidae
- Genus: Neolindus
- Species: N. apiculus

Binomial name
- Neolindus apiculus Herman, 1991

Species of beetle

Neolindus apiculus is a species of beetle of the family Staphylinidae. This species is known from the Panama and Colombia.

== Description ==
Adults reach a length of about 12.5 mm and are reddish brown.

== Etymology ==
The species name is derived from Latin apiculus (meaning apex or apical) and refers to the pointed apex of the aedeagus.
