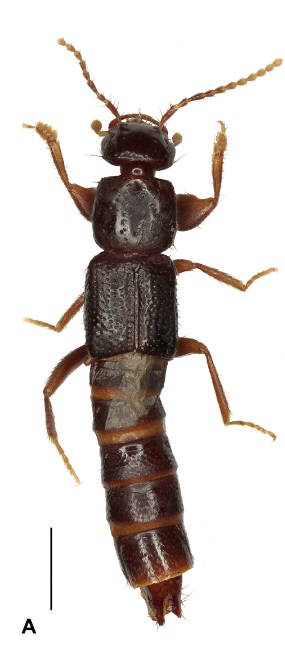

Scientific classification
- Kingdom: Animalia
- Phylum: Arthropoda
- Clade: Pancrustacea
- Class: Insecta
- Order: Coleoptera
- Suborder: Polyphaga
- Infraorder: Staphyliniformia
- Family: Staphylinidae
- Genus: Neolindus
- Species: N. sauron

Binomial name
- Neolindus sauron Guzman, Tokareva & Żyła, 2024

= Neolindus sauron =

Species of beetle

Neolindus sauron is a species of beetle of the family Staphylinidae. This species is known from the type locality in Guyana (Upper Demerara-Berbice, Iwokrama Forest, Turtle Mountain) and the nearby Iwokrama Mountains.

== Description ==
Adults have a brown head and pronotum, while the legs are light brown and the abdomen is brown.

== Etymology ==
The species name is inspired by the structure of antiparameral sclerite in the aedeagus resembling the 'Eye of Sauron' in the movie trilogy The Lord of the Rings based on J.R.R. Tolkien's book series.
