= Neolindus verhaaghi =

Scientific classification
- Kingdom: Animalia
- Phylum: Arthropoda
- Clade: Pancrustacea
- Class: Insecta
- Order: Coleoptera
- Suborder: Polyphaga
- Infraorder: Staphyliniformia
- Family: Staphylinidae
- Genus: Neolindus
- Species: N. verhaaghi

Binomial name
- Neolindus verhaaghi Irmler, 2011

Species of beetle

Neolindus verhaaghi is a species of beetle of the family Staphylinidae. This species is known from Peru.

== Description ==
Adults reach a length of about 4 mm and are red, although the legs, antennae and posterior edge of the tergites are yellow.

== Etymology ==
The species name refers to the collector of the species, Manfred Verhaagh, from the Natural History Museum in Karlsruhe, Germany.
