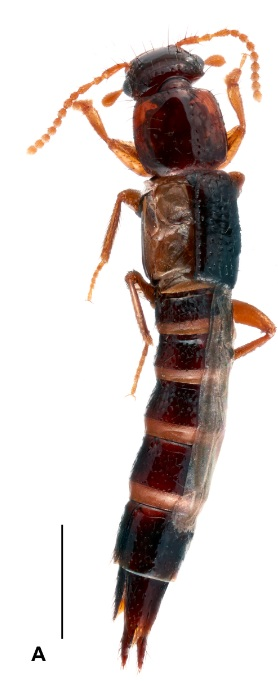

Scientific classification
- Kingdom: Animalia
- Phylum: Arthropoda
- Clade: Pancrustacea
- Class: Insecta
- Order: Coleoptera
- Suborder: Polyphaga
- Infraorder: Staphyliniformia
- Family: Staphylinidae
- Genus: Neolindus
- Species: N. napo

Binomial name
- Neolindus napo Guzman, Tokareva & Żyła, 2024

= Neolindus napo =

Species of beetle

Neolindus napo is a species of beetle of the family Staphylinidae. This species is known from the type locality in Ecuador (Sucumbíos, Shushufindi) and Suriname (Sipaliwini, Kabalebo).

== Description ==
Adults have a brown head and pronotum, while the legs are light brown and the abdomen is brown.

== Etymology ==
The species name napo is derived from the toponym of the type locality near the Napo River basin in Ecuador.
