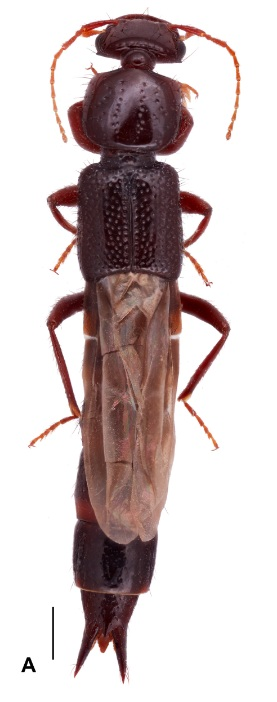

Scientific classification
- Kingdom: Animalia
- Phylum: Arthropoda
- Clade: Pancrustacea
- Class: Insecta
- Order: Coleoptera
- Suborder: Polyphaga
- Infraorder: Staphyliniformia
- Family: Staphylinidae
- Genus: Neolindus
- Species: N. volkeri

Binomial name
- Neolindus volkeri Guzman, Tokareva & Żyła, 2024

= Neolindus volkeri =

Species of beetle

Neolindus volkeri is a species of beetle of the family Staphylinidae. This species is known from the type locality in French Guiana (Cayenne, Roura).

== Description ==
Adults have a dark brown head and pronotum, while the legs are brown and the abdomen is dark brown.

== Etymology ==
The species is named in honour of taxonomist Volker Assing, who was a renowned specialist in Palaearctic and Oriental Paederinae and described two species of Neolindus.
