= Neolindus schubarti =

Scientific classification
- Kingdom: Animalia
- Phylum: Arthropoda
- Clade: Pancrustacea
- Class: Insecta
- Order: Coleoptera
- Suborder: Polyphaga
- Infraorder: Staphyliniformia
- Family: Staphylinidae
- Genus: Neolindus
- Species: N. schubarti

Binomial name
- Neolindus schubarti Irmler, 1981

Species of beetle

Neolindus schubarti is a species of beetle of the family Staphylinidae. This species is known from Brazil.

== Description ==
Adults reach a length of about 10 mm and are dark reddish brown, with the antennae and legs paler.
