= Neolindus incanalis =

Scientific classification
- Kingdom: Animalia
- Phylum: Arthropoda
- Clade: Pancrustacea
- Class: Insecta
- Order: Coleoptera
- Suborder: Polyphaga
- Infraorder: Staphyliniformia
- Family: Staphylinidae
- Genus: Neolindus
- Species: N. incanalis

Binomial name
- Neolindus incanalis Herman, 1991

Species of beetle

Neolindus incanalis is a species of beetle of the family Staphylinidae. This species is known from Costa Rica.

== Description ==
Adults reach a length of about 3 mm and are reddish brown, although the antennae and legs are yellowish brown.

== Etymology ==
The species name is derived from Latin in (meaning not or without) and canalis (meaning waterpipe) and refers to the absence of the internal canals of sternum VIII that are present in all of the other species of Neolindus.
