= Neolindus parallelus =

Scientific classification
- Kingdom: Animalia
- Phylum: Arthropoda
- Clade: Pancrustacea
- Class: Insecta
- Order: Coleoptera
- Suborder: Polyphaga
- Infraorder: Staphyliniformia
- Family: Staphylinidae
- Genus: Neolindus
- Species: N. parallelus

Binomial name
- Neolindus parallelus Herman, 1991

Species of beetle

Neolindus parallelus is a species of beetle of the family Staphylinidae. This species is known from Ecuador.

== Description ==
Adults reach a length of about 5.4 mm and are reddish brown, with the abdomen darker. The antennae and legs are yellowish brown.

== Etymology ==
The species name is derived from Latin parallelus (meaning side by side equidistantly) and refers to the parallel-sided emargination of the posterior margin of the male's eighth sternum.
