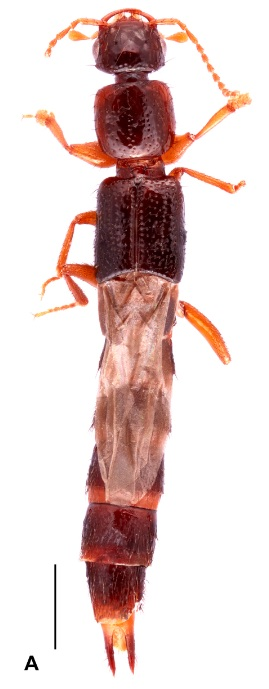

Scientific classification
- Kingdom: Animalia
- Phylum: Arthropoda
- Clade: Pancrustacea
- Class: Insecta
- Order: Coleoptera
- Suborder: Polyphaga
- Infraorder: Staphyliniformia
- Family: Staphylinidae
- Genus: Neolindus
- Species: N. ornatus

Binomial name
- Neolindus ornatus Guzman, Tokareva & Żyła, 2024

= Neolindus ornatus =

Species of beetle

Neolindus ornatus is a species of beetle in the family Staphylinidae. This species is known from the type locality in French Guiana (Cayenne, Roura, near Matoury) and the surrounding area.

== Description ==
The whole body and appendages are brown.

== Etymology ==
The species name is derived from Latin ornatus (meaning adorned or equipped) and refers to the complex structure of the aedeagus.
