= Neolindus bidens =

Scientific classification
- Kingdom: Animalia
- Phylum: Arthropoda
- Clade: Pancrustacea
- Class: Insecta
- Order: Coleoptera
- Suborder: Polyphaga
- Infraorder: Staphyliniformia
- Family: Staphylinidae
- Genus: Neolindus
- Species: N. bidens

Binomial name
- Neolindus bidens Herman, 1991

Species of beetle

Neolindus bidens is a species of beetle of the family Staphylinidae. This species is known from Ecuador.

== Description ==
Adults reach a length of about 7.1 mm and are dark reddish brown, with the antennae and legs paler.

== Etymology ==
The species name is derived from Latin bi (meaning two) and dens (meaning tooth) and refers to the two projections on the posterior margin of sternum VII.
