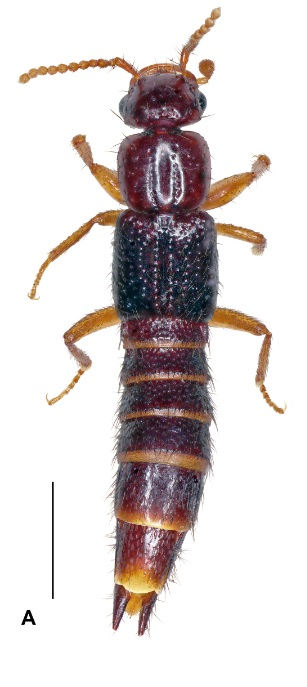

Scientific classification
- Kingdom: Animalia
- Phylum: Arthropoda
- Clade: Pancrustacea
- Class: Insecta
- Order: Coleoptera
- Suborder: Polyphaga
- Infraorder: Staphyliniformia
- Family: Staphylinidae
- Genus: Neolindus
- Species: N. elegans

Binomial name
- Neolindus elegans Guzman, Tokareva & Żyła, 2024

= Neolindus elegans =

Species of beetle

Neolindus elegans is a species of beetle of the Staphylinidae family. This species is known from the type locality in French Guiana (Saint-Laurent-du-Maroni, Saül).

== Description ==
Adults have a dark brown head and pronotum. The legs are brown and the abdomen is dark brown.

== Etymology ==
The species name is derived from Latin elegans (meaning elegant or tasteful) and refers to the symmetry of the aedeagus in parameral view, particularly the straight angle between the median lobe apex and some apical sclerites.
