= Neolindus plectrus =

Scientific classification
- Kingdom: Animalia
- Phylum: Arthropoda
- Clade: Pancrustacea
- Class: Insecta
- Order: Coleoptera
- Suborder: Polyphaga
- Infraorder: Staphyliniformia
- Family: Staphylinidae
- Genus: Neolindus
- Species: N. plectrus

Binomial name
- Neolindus plectrus Herman, 1991

Species of beetle

Neolindus plectrus is a species of beetle of the family Staphylinidae. This species is known from Venezuela.

== Description ==
Adults reach a length of about 6.2 mm and are reddish brown, while the elytra and abdomen are darker and the legs and antennae are paler.

== Etymology ==
The species name is derived from Latin plectrus (meaning a tool used to pluck or strike a stringed instrument) and refers to the shape of the apical projection of the aedeagus.
