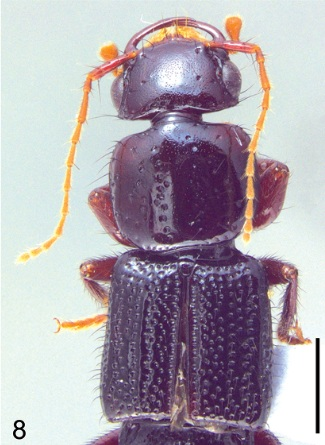

Scientific classification
- Kingdom: Animalia
- Phylum: Arthropoda
- Clade: Pancrustacea
- Class: Insecta
- Order: Coleoptera
- Suborder: Polyphaga
- Infraorder: Staphyliniformia
- Family: Staphylinidae
- Genus: Neolindus
- Species: N. hermani

Binomial name
- Neolindus hermani Asenjo, 2011

= Neolindus hermani =

Species of beetle

Neolindus hermani is a species of beetle of the family Staphylinidae. This species is known from Costa Rica and French Guiana.

== Description ==
Adult insects are dark brown in color. Their jaws (mandibles), thighs (femora), shins (tibiae), and the first two segments of their antennae are dark reddish-brown. The remaining segments of the antennae (segments 3 to 11) range from reddish-brown to yellow.

== Etymology ==
The species is named in honor of Dr. Lee Herman of the American Museum of Natural History.
