= Neolindus sinuatus =

Scientific classification
- Kingdom: Animalia
- Phylum: Arthropoda
- Clade: Pancrustacea
- Class: Insecta
- Order: Coleoptera
- Suborder: Polyphaga
- Infraorder: Staphyliniformia
- Family: Staphylinidae
- Genus: Neolindus
- Species: N. sinuatus

Binomial name
- Neolindus sinuatus Herman, 1991

Species of beetle

Neolindus sinuatus is a species of beetle of the family Staphylinidae. This species is known from Peru and Brazil (Para).

== Description ==
Adults reach a length of about 6.8 mm and are reddish brown, with the elytra and abdomen darker and the antennae and legs paler.

== Etymology ==
The species name is derived from Latin sinuatus (meaning bend or curve) and refers to the form of the basal margin of the emargination of the posterior margin of sternum VIII.
