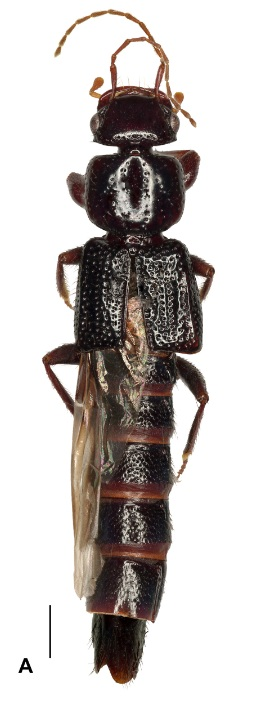

Scientific classification
- Kingdom: Animalia
- Phylum: Arthropoda
- Clade: Pancrustacea
- Class: Insecta
- Order: Coleoptera
- Suborder: Polyphaga
- Infraorder: Staphyliniformia
- Family: Staphylinidae
- Genus: Neolindus
- Species: N. utriensis

Binomial name
- Neolindus utriensis Guzman, Tokareva & Żyła, 2024

= Neolindus utriensis =

Species of beetle

Neolindus utriensis is a species of beetle of the family Staphylinidae. This species is known from the type locality in Colombia (Choco, Bahía Solano, Utría National Natural Park).

== Description ==
Adults have a dark brown head and pronotum, while the legs are brown and the abdomen is dark brown.

== Etymology ==
The species name is derived from the name of the Utría National Natural Park in Chocó, Colombia, which is the type locality.
