= List of beetles of Ireland =

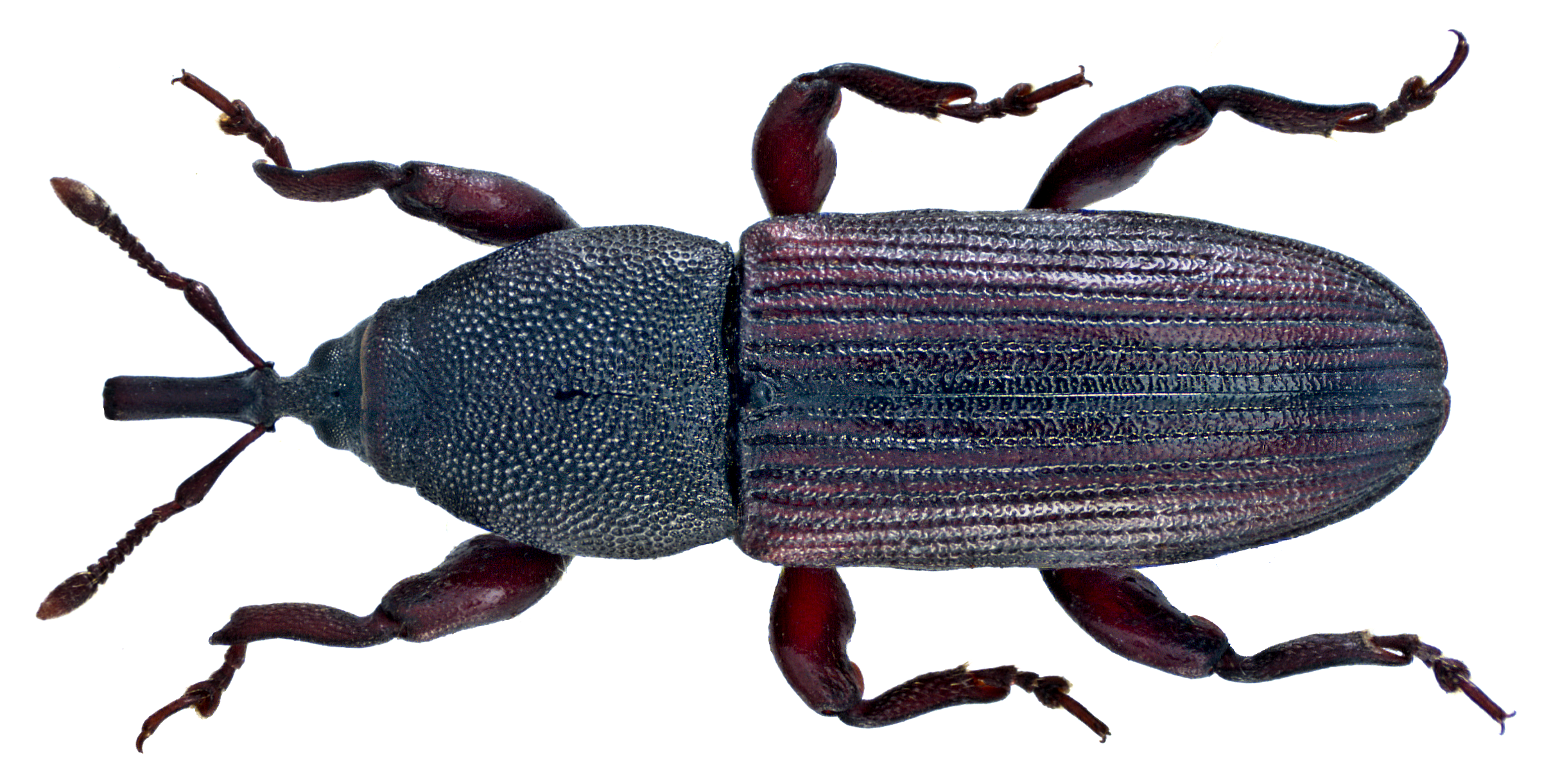
Rhopalomesites tardyi described in 1825 from specimens collected in Killarney by James Tardy

There are over 2,154 species of Coleoptera (beetles) native to Ireland. These are disposed in 84 families. By contrast there are 4,034 species of Coleoptera in the British Isles, consisting of 106 families. The largest beetle families in Ireland are the rove beetles (Staphylinidae) with 641 species, the weevils (Curculionidae) with 214 species, and the ground beetles (Carabidae) with 210 species.

== Suborder Adephaga (adephagans) ==
=== Family Carabidae (ground beetles) ===
==== Cicindelinae Latreille, 1802 ====
- Cicindela campestris Linnaeus, 1758

==== Brachininae Bonelli, 1810 ====
- Brachinus crepitans (Linnaeus, 1758)

==== Carabinae Latreille, 1802 ====
Carabini Latreille, 1802

- Calosoma inquisitor (Linnaeus, 1758)
- Carabus clathratus Linnaeus, 1761
- Carabus arvensis Herbst, 1784
- Carabus granulatus Linnaeus, 1758
- Carabus monilis Fabricius, 1792
- Carabus nemoralis O. F. Müller, 1764
- Carabus nitens Linnaeus, 1758
- Carabus glabratus Paykull, 1790
- Carabus problematicus Herbst, 1786
- Cychrus caraboides (Linnaeus, 1758)

Nebriini Laporte, 1834

- Leistus montanus Stephens, 1827
- Leistus rufomarginatus (Duftschmid, 1812)
- Leistus fulvibarbis Dejean, 1826
- Leistus terminatus (Hellwig in Panzer, 1793)
- Nebria brevicollis (Fabricius, 1792)
- Nebria salina Fairmaire & Laboulbène, 1854
- Nebria rufescens (Ström, 1768)
- Eurynebria complanata (Linnaeus, 1767)
- Pelophila borealis (Paykull, 1790)

Notiophilini Motschulsky, 1850

- Notiophilus aestuans Motschulsky, 1864
- Notiophilus aquaticus (Linnaeus, 1758)
- Notiophilus biguttatus (Fabricius, 1779)
- Notiophilus germinyi Fauvel, 1863
- Notiophilus palustris (Duftschmid, 1812)
- Notiophilus rufipes Curtis, 1829
- Notiophilus substriatus G. R. Waterhouse, 1833

Elaphrini Latreille, 1802

- Blethisa multipunctata (Linnaeus, 1758)
- Elaphrus cupreus Duftschmid, 1812
- Elaphrus uliginosus Fabricius, 1792
- Elaphrus riparius (Linnaeus, 1758)

Loricerini Bonelli, 1810

- Loricera pilicornis (Fabricius, 1775)
- Clivina fossor (Linnaeus, 1758)
- Dyschirius obscurus (Gyllenhal, 1827)
- Dyschirius thoracicus (Rossi, 1790)
- Dyschirius globosus (Herbst, 1784)
- Dyschirius impunctipennis Dawson, 1854
- Dyschirius politus (Dejean, 1825)
- Dyschirius salinus Schaum, 1843

Broscini Hope, 1838

- Broscus cephalotes (Linnaeus, 1758)
- Miscodera arctica (Paykull, 1798)

Trechini Bonelli, 1810

- Perileptus areolatus (Creutzer, 1799)
- Aepus marinus (Ström, 1783)
- Aepus robinii (Laboulbène, 1849)
- Trechus rivularis (Gyllenhal, 1810)
- Trechus fulvus Dejean, 1831
- Trechus obtusus Erichson, 1837
- Trechus quadristriatus (Schrank, 1781)
- Trechus rubens (Fabricius, 1792)
- Trechus subnotatus Dejean, 1831
- Blemus discus (Fabricius, 1792)
- Trechoblemus micros (Herbst, 1784)
- Tachys micros (Fischer von Waldheim, 1828)
- Asaphidion curtum (Heyden, 1870)
- Asaphidion flavipes (Linnaeus, 1761)
- Asaphidion pallipes (Duftschmid, 1812)
- Ocys harpaloides (Audinet-Serville, 1821)
- Cillenus lateralis Samouelle, 1819
- Bracteon argenteolum (Ahrens, 1812)
- Bembidion lampros (Herbst, 1784)
- Bembidion punctulatum Drapiez, 1821
- Bembidion pallidipenne (Illiger, 1802)
- Bembidion bipunctatum (Linnaeus, 1761)
- Bembidion dentellum (Thunberg, 1787)
- Bembidion varium (Olivier, 1795)
- Bembidion geniculatum Heer, 1837/8
- Bembidion tibiale (Duftschmid, 1812)
- Bembidion bruxellense Wesmael, 1835
- Bembidion bualei Jacquelin du Val, 1852
- Bembidion decorum (Zenker in Panzer, 1800)
- Bembidion deletum Audinet-Serville, 1821
- Bembidion femoratum Sturm, 1825
- Bembidion lunatum (Duftschmid, 1812)
- Bembidion maritimum (Stephens, 1835)
- Bembidion monticola Sturm, 1825
- Bembidion saxatile Gyllenhal, 1827
- Bembidion stephensii Crotch, 1866
- Bembidion tetracolum Say, 1825
- Bembidion illigeri Netolitzky, 1914
- Bembidion gilvipes Sturm, 1825
- Bembidion assimile Gyllenhal, 1810
- Bembidion clarkii (Dawson, 1849)
- Bembidion fumigatum (Duftschmid, 1812)
- Bembidion minimum (Fabricius, 1792)
- Bembidion normannum Dejean, 1831
- Bembidion doris (Panzer, 1796)
- Bembidion obtusum Audinet-Serville, 1821
- Bembidion aeneum Germar, 1824
- Bembidion guttula (Fabricius, 1792)
- Bembidion lunulatum (Geoffroy in Fourcroy, 1785)
- Bembidion mannerheimii C. R. Sahlberg, 1827
- Pogonus chalceus (Marsham, 1802)
- Pogonus littoralis (Duftschmid, 1812)

Patrobini Kirby, 1837

- Patrobus assimilis Chaudoir, 1844
- Patrobus atrorufus (Ström, 1768)
- Patrobus septentrionis Dejean, 1828

Pterostichini Bonelli, 1810

- Stomis pumicatus (Panzer, 1795)
- Poecilus cupreus (Linnaeus, 1758)
- Poecilus versicolor (Sturm, 1824)
- Pterostichus aethiops (Panzer, 1796)
- Pterostichus madidus (Fabricius, 1775)
- Pterostichus aterrimus (Herbst, 1784)
- Pterostichus niger (Schaller, 1783)
- Pterostichus adstrictus Eschscholtz, 1823
- Pterostichus oblongopunctatus (Fabricius, 1787)
- Pterostichus melanarius (Illiger, 1798)
- Pterostichus anthracinus (Panzer, 1795)
- Pterostichus gracilis (Dejean, 1828)
- Pterostichus minor (Gyllenhal, 1827)
- Pterostichus nigrita (Paykull, 1790)
- Pterostichus rhaeticus Heer, 1837/8
- Pterostichus vernalis (Panzer, 1795)
- Pterostichus diligens (Sturm, 1824)
- Pterostichus strenuus (Panzer, 1796)
- Abax parallelepipedus (Piller & Mitterpacher, 1783)

Sphodrini Laporte, 1834

- Platyderus depressus (Audinet-Serville, 1821)
- Synuchus vivalis (Illiger, 1798)
- Calathus rotundicollis Dejean, 1828
- Calathus cinctus Motschulsky, 1850
- Calathus erratus (C. R. Sahlberg, 1827)
- Calathus fuscipes (Goeze, 1777)
- Calathus melanocephalus (Linnaeus, 1758)
- Calathus micropterus (Duftschmid, 1812)
- Calathus mollis (Marsham, 1802)
- Sphodrus leucophthalmus (Linnaeus, 1758)
- Laemostenus complanatus (Dejean, 1828)
- Laemostenus terricola (Herbst, 1784)
- Olisthopus rotundatus (Paykull, 1790)
- Oxypselaphus obscurus (Herbst, 1784)
- Paranchus albipes (Fabricius, 1796)
- Anchomenus dorsalis (Pontoppidan, 1763)
- Batenus livens (Gyllenhal, 1810)
- Agonum fuliginosum (Panzer, 1809)
- Agonum gracile Sturm, 1824
- Agonum micans Nicolai, 1822
- Agonum piceum (Linnaeus, 1758)
- Agonum thoreyi Dejean, 1828
- Agonum lugens (Duftschmid, 1812)
- Agonum marginatum (Linnaeus, 1758)
- Agonum muelleri (Herbst, 1784)
- Agonum nigrum Dejean, 1828
- Agonum versutum Sturm, 1824
- Agonum viduum (Panzer, 1796)
- Amara plebeja (Gyllenhal, 1810)
- Amara aenea (De Geer, 1774)
- Amara communis (Panzer, 1797)
- Amara convexior Stephens, 1828
- Amara familiaris (Duftschmid, 1812)
- Amara lucida (Duftschmid, 1812)
- Amara lunicollis Schiødte, 1837
- Amara montivaga Sturm, 1825
- Amara ovata (Fabricius, 1792)
- Amara similata (Gyllenhal, 1810)
- Amara tibialis (Paykull, 1798)
- Amara bifrons (Gyllenhal, 1810)
- Amara praetermissa (C. R. Sahlberg, 1827)
- Amara apricaria (Paykull, 1790)
- Amara consularis (Duftschmid, 1812)
- Amara fulva (O. F. Müller, 1776)
- Curtonotus aulicus (Panzer, 1796)
- Curtonotus convexiusculus (Marsham, 1802)

Harpalini Bonelli, 1810

- Harpalus rufipes (De Geer, 1774)
- Harpalus affinis (Schrank, 1781)
- Harpalus anxius (Duftschmid, 1812)
- Harpalus laevipes Zetterstedt, 1828
- Harpalus latus (Linnaeus, 1758)
- Harpalus rubripes (Duftschmid, 1812)
- Harpalus rufipalpis Sturm, 1818
- Harpalus tardus (Panzer, 1796)
- Ophonus puncticeps Stephens, 1828
- Ophonus rufibarbis (Fabricius, 1792)
- Anisodactylus binotatus (Fabricius, 1787)
- Anisodactylus nemorivagus (Duftschmid, 1812)
- Dicheirotrichus gustavii Crotch, 1871
- Trichocellus cognatus (Gyllenhal, 1827)
- Trichocellus placidus (Gyllenhal, 1827)
- Bradycellus caucasicus (Chaudoir, 1846)
- Bradycellus harpalinus (Audinet-Serville, 1821)
- Bradycellus ruficollis (Stephens, 1828)
- Bradycellus sharpi Joy, 1912
- Bradycellus verbasci (Duftschmid, 1812)
- Stenolophus mixtus (Herbst, 1784)
- Acupalpus dubius Schilsky, 1888
- Acupalpus parvulus (Sturm, 1825)
- Anthracus consputus (Duftschmid, 1812)
- Chlaenius nigricornis (Fabricius, 1787)
- Chlaenius tristis (Schaller, 1783)
- Chlaenius vestitus (Paykull, 1790)

Licinini Bonelli, 1810

- Badister bullatus (Schrank, 1798)
- Badister meridionalis Puel, 1925
- Badister unipustulatus Bonelli, 1813
- Badister sodalis (Duftschmid, 1812)
- Badister collaris Motschulsky, 1844
- Badister dilatatus Chaudoir, 1837
- Badister peltatus (Panzer, 1797)

Panagaeini Bonelli, 1810

- Panagaeus cruxmajor (Linnaeus, 1758)

Masoreini Chaudoir, 1870

- Lebia chlorocephala (J. Hoffmann, 1803)
- Lebia cruxminor (Linnaeus, 1758)
- Demetrias atricapillus (Linnaeus, 1758)
- Cymindis vaporariorum (Linnaeus, 1758)
- Paradromius linearis (Olivier, 1795)
- Dromius meridionalis Dejean, 1825
- Dromius quadrimaculatus (Linnaeus, 1758)
- Calodromius spilotus (Illiger, 1798)
- Philorhizus melanocephalus (Dejean, 1825)
- Philorhizus notatus (Stephens, 1827)
- Syntomus foveatus (Geoffroy in Fourcroy, 1785)
- Syntomus truncatellus (Linnaeus, 1761)

=== Family Dytiscidae (predaceous diving beetles, water tigers) ===
- Agabus arcticus (Paykull, 1798)
- Agabus congener (Thunberg, 1794)
- Agabus sturmii (Gyllenhal, 1808)
- Agabus labiatus (Brahm, 1790)
- Agabus affinis (Paykull, 1798)
- Agabus biguttatus (Olivier, 1795)
- Agabus bipustulatus (Linnaeus, 1767)
- Agabus conspersus (Marsham, 1802)
- Agabus guttatus (Paykull, 1798)
- Agabus nebulosus (Forster, 1771)
- Agabus paludosus (Fabricius, 1801)
- Agabus unguicularis (Thomson, 1867)
- Ilybius aenescens Thomson, 1870
- Ilybius ater (DeGeer, 1774)
- Ilybius chalconatus (Panzer, 1796)
- Ilybius fuliginosus (Fabricius, 1792)
- Ilybius guttiger (Gyllenhal, 1808)
- Ilybius montanus (Stephens, 1828)
- Ilybius quadriguttatus (Lacordaire, 1835)
- Ilybius subaeneus Erichson, 1837
- Colymbetes fuscus (Linnaeus, 1758)
- Rhantus grapii (Gyllenhal, 1808)
- Rhantus exsoletus (Forster, 1771)
- Rhantus frontalis (Marsham, 1802)
- Rhantus suturalis (Macleay, 1825)
- Rhantus suturellus (Harris, 1828)
- Liopterus haemorrhoidalis (Fabricius, 1787)
- Acilius canaliculatus (Nicolai, 1822)
- Acilius sulcatus (Linnaeus, 1758)
- Dytiscus circumcinctus Ahrens, 1811
- Dytiscus circumflexus Fabricius, 1801
- Dytiscus lapponicus Gyllenhal, 1808
- Dytiscus marginalis Linnaeus, 1758
- Dytiscus semisulcatus Müller, 1776
- Hydaticus seminiger (DeGeer, 1774)
- Bidessus minutissimus (Germar, 1824)
- Graptodytes bilineatus (Sturm, 1835)
- Graptodytes granularis (Linnaeus, 1767)
- Graptodytes pictus (Fabricius, 1787)
- Hydroporus angustatus Sturm, 1835
- Hydroporus discretus Fairmaire & Brisout, 1859
- Hydroporus erythrocephalus (Linnaeus, 1758)
- Hydroporus glabriusculus (Aubé, 1838)
- Hydroporus gyllenhalii Schiødte, 1841
- Hydroporus incognitus Sharp, 1869
- Hydroporus longicornis Sharp, 1871
- Hydroporus longulus Mulsant & Rey, 1860
- Hydroporus melanarius Sturm, 1835
- Hydroporus memnonius Nicolai, 1822
- Hydroporus morio Aubé, 1838
- Hydroporus neglectus Schaum, 1845
- Hydroporus nigrita (Fabricius, 1792)
- Hydroporus obscurus Sturm, 1835
- Hydroporus obsoletus Aubé, 1838
- Hydroporus palustris (Linnaeus, 1761)
- Hydroporus planus (Fabricius, 1782)
- Hydroporus pubescens (Gyllenhal, 1808)
- Hydroporus scalesianus Stephens, 1828
- Hydroporus striola (Gyllenhal, 1826)
- Hydroporus tessellatus Drapiez, 1819
- Hydroporus tristis (Paykull, 1798)
- Hydroporus umbrosus (Gyllenhal, 1808)
- Nebrioporus assimilis (Paykull, 1798)
- Nebrioporus depressus (Fabricius, 1775)
- Nebrioporus elegans (Panzer, 1794)
- Oreodytes davisii (Curtis, 1831)
- Oreodytes sanmarkii (Sahlberg, 1826)
- Oreodytes septentrionalis (Gyllenhal, 1826)
- Porhydrus lineatus (Fabricius, 1775)
- Stictonectes lepidus (Olivier, 1795)
- Stictotarsus duodecimpustulatus (Fabricius, 1792)
- Stictotarsus multilineatus (Falkenström, 1922)
- Suphrodytes dorsalis (Fabricius, 1787)
- Hydrovatus clypealis Sharp, 1876
- Hygrotus confluens (Fabricius, 1787)
- Hygrotus impressopunctatus (Schaller, 1783)
- Hygrotus novemlineatus (Stephens, 1829)
- Hygrotus decoratus Gyllenhal, 1810
- Hygrotus inaequalis (Fabricius, 1777)
- Hygrotus quinquelineatus (Zetterstedt, 1828)
- Hygrotus versicolor (Schaller, 1783)
- Hygrotus parallellogrammus (Ahrens, 1812)
- Hyphydrus ovatus (Linnaeus, 1761)
- Laccornis oblongus (Stephens, 1835)
- Laccophilus hyalinus (DeGeer, 1774)
- Laccophilus minutus (Linnaeus, 1758)

=== Family Noteridae (burrowing water beetles) ===
- Noterus clavicornis (DeGeer, 1774)
- Noterus crassicornis (Müller, O.F 1776)

=== Family Haliplidae (crawling water beetles) ===
- Brychius elevatus (Panzer, 1794)
- Haliplus apicalis (Thomson, 1868)
- Haliplus confinis (Stephens, 1828)
- Haliplus flavicollis (Sturm, 1834)
- Haliplus fluviatilis (Aubé, 1836)
- Haliplus fulvus (Fabricius, 1801)
- Haliplus immaculatus (Gerhardt, 1877)
- Haliplus lineatocollis (Marsham, 1802)
- Haliplus lineolatus (Mannerheim, 1844)
- Haliplus obliquus (Fabricius, 1787)
- Haliplus ruficollis (DeGeer, 1774)
- Haliplus sibiricus Motschulsky, 1860
- Haliplus variegatus Sturm, 1834

=== Family Gyrinidae (whirligig beetles) ===
- Gyrinus aeratus (Stephens, 1835)
- Gyrinus caspius Ménétriés, 1832
- Gyrinus distinctus Aubé, 1838
- Gyrinus marinus Gyllenhal, 1808
- Gyrinus minutus Fabricius, 1798
- Gyrinus natator (Linnaeus, 1758)
- Gyrinus paykulli Ochs, 1927
- Gyrinus substriatus Stephens, 1828
- Gyrinus urinator Illiger, 1807
- Orectochilus villosus (Müller, 1776)

=== Family Hygrobiidae (screech-beetles) ===
1 species

- Hygrobia hermanni (Fabricius, 1775)

== Suborder Polyphaga ==
=== Infraorder Bostrichiformia ===
==== Family Ptinidae (woodworm, woodborers, spider beetles) ====
18 species Subfamily Anobiinae

- Anobium punctatum (DeGeer, 1774)
- Stegobium paniceum (Linnaeus, 1758)

Subfamily Dryophilinae

- Dryophilus pusillus (Gyllenhal, 1808)
- Grynobius planus (Fabricius, 1781)

Subfamily Ernobiinae

- Ernobius mollis (Linnaeus, 1758)
- Ochina ptinoides (Marsham, 1802)
- Xestobium rufovillosum (DeGeer, 1774)

Subfamily Eucradinae

- Ptinomorphus imperialis (Linnaeus, 1767)

Subfamily Ptilininae

- Ptilinus pectinicornis (Linnaeus, 1758)

Subfamily Ptininae

- Epauloecus unicolor (Piller & Mitterpacher, 1783)
- Mezium affine Boieldieu, 1856
- Niptus hololeucus (Faldermann, 1835)
- Pseudeurostus hilleri (Reitter, 1877)
- Ptinus clavipes Panzer, 1792
- Ptinus fur (Linnaeus, 1758)
- Ptinus subpilosus Sturm, 1837
- Ptinus tectus Boieldieu, 1856
- Trigonogenius globulum Solier, 1849

Subfamily Xyletininae

- Lasioderma serricorne (Fabricius, 1792)

==== Family Bostrichidae (horned powderpost beetles, powderpost beetles, branch and twig borers) ====
- Rhyzopertha dominica (Fabricius, 1792)
- Lyctus brunneus (Stephens, 1830)
- Lyctus linearis (Goeze, 1777)

==== Family Dermestidae (skin beetles) ====
Subfamily Attageninae

- Reesa vespulae (Millirin, 1939)
- Attagenus pellio (Linnaeus, 1758)
- Attagenus unicolor (Brahm, 1791)

Subfamily Dermestinae

- Dermestes ater DeGeer, 1774
- Dermestes carnivorus Fabricius, 1775
- Dermestes frischii Kugelann, 1792
- Dermestes haemorrhoidalis Küster, 1852
- Dermestes lardarius Linnaeus, 1758
- Dermestes maculatus DeGeer, 1774
- Dermestes murinus Linnaeus, 1758
- Dermestes peruvianus Laporte de Castelnau, 1840

Subfamily Megatominae

- Anthrenus fuscus Olivier, 1789
- Anthrenus verbasci (Linnaeus, 1767)
- Trogoderma granarium Everts, 1898

=== Infraorder Cucujiformia ===
==== Family Alexiidae (minute bark beetles) ====
- Sphaerosoma piliferum (Müller, 1821)

==== Family Anthicidae (ant-like flower beetles) ====
- Anthicus angustatus Curtis, 1838
- Anthicus constrictus Curtis, 1838
- Anthicus flavipes (Panzer 1797)
- Anthicus floralis (Linnaeus, 1758)
- Notoxus monoceros (Linnaeus, 1761)

==== Family Anthribidae (fungus weevils) ====
- Choragus sheppardi Kirby, 1819

==== Family Apionidae (seed weevils) ====
Subfamily Apioninae

- Apion cruentatum Walton, 1844
- Apion frumentarium (Linnaeus, 1758)
- Apion miniatum Germar, 1833
- Apion haematodes Kirby, 1808
- Apion rubens Stephens, 1839
- Apion onopordi Kirby, 1808
- Apion carduorum Kirby, 1808
- Apion gibbirostre Gyllenhal, 1813
- Apion aeneum (Fabricius, 1775)
- Apion radiolus (Marsham, 1802)
- Apion seniculus Kirby, 1808
- Apion gyllenhali Kirby, 1808
- Apion confluens Kirby, 1808
- Apion stolidum Germar, 1817
- Apion ervi Kirby, 1808
- Apion viciae (Paykull, 1800)
- Apion vorax Herbst, 1797
- Apion ulicis (Forster, 1771)
- Apion aethiops Herbst, 1797
- Apion pisi (Fabricius, 1801)
- Apion loti Kirby, 1808
- Apion modestum Germar, 1817
- Apion virens Herbst, 1797
- Apion cerdo Gerstäcker, 1854
- Apion craccae (Linnaeus, 1767)
- Apion subulatum Kirby, 1808
- Apion affine Kirby, 1808
- Apion curtirostre Germar, 1817
- Apion hydrolapathi (Marsham, 1802)
- Apion marchicum Herbst, 1797
- Apion violaceum Kirby, 1808
- Apion immune Kirby, 1808
- Apion apricans Herbst, 1797
- Apion assimile Kirby, 1808
- Apion fulvipes (Geoffroy, 1785)
- Apion nigritarse Kirby, 1808
- Apion ononicola Bach, 1854
- Apion trifolii (Linnaeus, 1768)
- Apion atratulum Germar, 1817
- Apion rufirostre (Fabricius, 1775)
- Apion scutellare Kirby, 1811
- Apion ebeninum Kirby, 1808

Subfamily Nanophyinae

- Nanophyes marmoratus (Goeze, 1777)

==== Family Bothrideridae (dry bark beetles) ====
- Anommatus duodecimstriatus (Müller, 1821)

==== Family Byturidae (fruitworms) ====
- Byturus tomentosus (DeGeer, 1774)
- Byturus ochraceus (Scriba, 1790)

==== Family Cerambycidae (longhorn beetles) ====
- Aromia moschata (Linnaeus, 1758)
- Callidium violaceum (Linnaeus, 1758)
- Clytus arietis (Linnaeus, 1758)
- Hylotrupes bajulus (Linnaeus, 1758)
- Nathrius brevipennis (Mulsant, 1839)
- Lamia textor (Linnaeus, 1758)
- Leiopus nebulosus (Linnaeus, 1758)
- Pogonocherus hispidulus (Piller & Mitterpacher, 1783)
- Pogonocherus hispidus (Linnaeus, 1758)
- Tetrops praeustus (Linnaeus, 1758)
- Alosterna tabacicolor (DeGeer, 1775)
- Grammoptera abdominalis (Stephens, 1831)
- Grammoptera ruficornis (Fabricius, 1781)
- Grammoptera ustulata Schaller, 1783
- Leptura aurulenta Fabricius, 1792
- Leptura quadrifasciata Linnaeus, 1758
- Leptura quadrifasciata Linnaeus, 1758
- Pseudovadonia livida (Fabricius, 1777)
- Rhagium bifasciatum Fabricius, 1775
- Rhagium mordax (DeGeer, 1775)
- Rutpela maculata Poda, 1761
- Stenurella melanura Linnaeus, 1758
- Asemum striatum (Linnaeus, 1758)

==== Family Chrysomelidae (leaf beetles) ====
- Bruchidius ater (Marsham, 1802)
- Bruchus atomarius (Linnaeus, 1761)
- Bruchus rufimanus Bohemann, 1833
- Chrysolina banksi (Fabricius, 1775)
- Chrysolina fastuosa (Scopoli, 1763)
- Chrysolina hyperici (Forster, 1771)
- Chrysolina oricalcia (Müller, 1776)
- Chrysolina polita (Linnaeus, 1758)
- Chrysolina sanguinolenta (Linnaeus, 1758)
- Chrysolina staphylaea (Linnaeus, 1758)
- Chrysolina varians (Schaller, 1783)
- Gastrophysa polygoni (Linnaeus, 1758)
- Gastrophysa viridula (DeGeer, 1775)
- Gonioctena olivacea (Forster, 1771)
- Gonioctena pallida (Linnaeus, 1758)
- Hydrothassa marginella (Linnaeus, 1758)
- Linaeida aenea Linnaeus, 1758
- Phaedon armoraciae (Linnaeus, 1758)
- Phaedon cochleariae (Fabricius, 1792)
- Phaedon tumidulus (Germar, 1824)
- Phratora laticollis (Suffrian, 1851)
- Phratora vitellinae (Linnaeus, 1758)
- Phratora vulgatissima (Linnaeus, 1758)
- Plagiodera versicolora (Laicharting, 1781)
- Prasocuris junci (Brahm, 1790)
- Prasocuris phellandrii (Linnaeus, 1758)
- Timarcha goettingensis (Linnaeus, 1758)
- Timarcha tenebricosa (Fabricius, 1775)
- Lema cyanella (Linnaeus, 1758)
- Lilioceris lilii (Scopoli, 1763)
- Oulema lichenis Voet, 1806
- Oulema melanopus (Linnaeus, 1758)
- Oulema septentrionis Weise, 1880
- Clytra quadripunctata (Linnaeus, 1758)
- Cryptocephalus aureolus Suffrian, 1847
- Cryptocephalus labiatus (Linnaeus, 1761)
- Cryptocephalus pusillus Fabricius, 1777
- Donacia aquatica (Linnaeus, 1758)
- Donacia bicolora Zschach, 1788
- Donacia cinerea Herbst, 1784
- Donacia clavipes Fabricius, 1792
- Donacia crassipes Fabricius, 1775
- Donacia dentata Hoppe, 1795
- Donacia impressa Paykull, 1799
- Donacia marginata Hoppe, 1795
- Donacia obscura Gyllenhal, 1813
- Donacia semicuprea Panzer, 1796
- Donacia simplex Fabricius, 1775
- Donacia thalassina Germar, 1811
- Donacia versicolorea (Brahm, 1790)
- Donacia vulgaris Zschach, 1788
- Macroplea appendiculata (Panzer, 1794)
- Plateumaris bracata (Scopoli, 1772)
- Plateumaris discolor (Panzer, 1795)
- Plateumaris rustica (Kunze, 1818)
- Plateumaris sericea (Linnaeus, 1758)
- Altica ericeti (Allard, 1869)
- Altica lythri Aubé, 1843
- Altica oleracea (Linnaeus, 1758)
- Altica palustris Weise, 1888
- Altica pusilla Duftschmid, 1825
- Aphthona atrovirens Förster, 1849
- Aphthona euphorbiae (Schrank, 1781)
- Aphthona lutescens (Gyllenhal, 1813)
- Aphthona melancholica Weise, 1888
- Aphthona nonstriata (Goeze, 1777)
- Apteropeda globosa (Illiger, 1794)
- Apteropeda orbiculata (Marsham, 1802)
- Apteropeda splendida Allard, 1860
- Batophila rubi (Paykull, 1799)
- Chaetocnema concinna (Marsham, 1802)
- Chaetocnema hortensis (Geoffroy, 1785)
- Chaetocnema sahlbergii (Gyllenhal, 1827)
- Crepidodera aurata (Marsham, 1802)
- Crepidodera aurea (Geoffroy, 1785)
- Crepidodera fulvicornis (Fabricius, 1792)
- Derocrepis rufipes (Linnaeus, 1758)
- Galeruca tanaceti (Linnaeus, 1758)
- Galerucella calmariensis (Linnaeus, 1767)
- Galerucella grisescens (de Joannis, 1865)
- Galerucella lineola (Fabricius, 1781)
- Galerucella nymphaeae (Linnaeus, 1758)
- Galerucella pusilla (Duftschmid, 1825)
- Galerucella sagittariae (Gyllenhal, 1813)
- Galerucella tenella (Linnaeus, 1761)
- Hermaeophaga mercurialis (Fabricius, 1792)
- Hippuriphila modeeri (Linnaeus, 1761)
- Lochmaea caprea (Linnaeus, 1758)
- Lochmaea crataegi (Forster, 1771)
- Lochmaea suturalis (Thomson, 1866)
- Longitarsus anchusae (Paykull, 1799)
- Longitarsus atricillus (Linnaeus, 1761)
- Longitarsus ballotae (Marsham, 1802)
- Longitarsus brunneus (Duftschmid, 1825)
- Longitarsus curtus (Allard, 1860)
- Longitarsus exoletus (Linnaeus, 1758)
- Longitarsus ferrugineus (Foudras, 1860)
- Longitarsus ganglbaueri Heikertinger, 1912
- Longitarsus gracilis Kutschera, 1864
- Longitarsus holsaticus (Linnaeus, 1758)
- Longitarsus jacobaeae (Waterhouse, 1858)
- Longitarsus kutscherai (Rye, 1872)
- Longitarsus luridus (Scopoli, 1763)
- Longitarsus melanocephalus (DeGeer, 1775)
- Longitarsus membranaceus (Foudras, 1860)
- Longitarsus nigerrimus (Gyllenhal, 1827)
- Longitarsus nigrofasciatus (Goeze, 1877)
- Longitarsus ochroleucus (Marsham, 1802)
- Longitarsus parvulus (Paykull, 1799)
- Longitarsus pellucidus (Foudras, 1860)
- Longitarsus pratensis (Panzer, 1794)
- Longitarsus rubiginosus (Foudras, 1860)
- Longitarsus succineus (Foudras, 1860)
- Longitarsus suturalis (Marsham, 1802)
- Longitarsus suturellus (Duftschmid, 1825)
- Lythraria salicariae (Paykull, 1800)
- Mantura chrysanthemi (Koch, 1803)
- Mniophila muscorum (Koch, 1803)
- Neocrepidodera ferruginea (Scopoli, 1763)
- Neocrepidodera transversa (Marsham, 1802)
- Ochrosis ventralis (Illiger, 1807)
- Phyllobrotica quadrimaculata (Linnaeus, 1758)
- Phyllotreta aerea Allard, 1859
- Phyllotreta atra (Fabricius, 1775)
- Phyllotreta consobrina (Curtis, 1837)
- Phyllotreta exclamationis (Thunberg, 1784)
- Phyllotreta flexuosa (Illiger, 1794)
- Phyllotreta nemorum (Linnaeus, 1758)
- Phyllotreta nigripes (Fabricius, 1775)
- Phyllotreta nodicornis (Marsham, 1802)
- Phyllotreta undulata Kutschera, 1860
- Phyllotreta vittula (Redtenbacher, 1849)
- Podagrica fuscipes (Fabricius, 1775)
- Psylliodes affinis (Paykull, 1799)
- Psylliodes attenuata (Koch, 1803)
- Psylliodes chrysocephala (Linnaeus, 1758)
- Psylliodes cuprea (Koch, 1803)
- Psylliodes dulcamarae (Koch, 1803)
- Psylliodes marcida (Illiger, 1807)
- Psylliodes napi (Fabricius, 1792)
- Psylliodes picina (Marsham, 1802)
- Pyrrhalta viburni (Paykull, 1799)
- Sermylassa halensis (Linnaeus, 1767)
- Sphaeroderma rubidum (Graëlls, 1858)
- Sphaeroderma testaceum (Fabricius, 1775)
- Cassida flaveola Thunberg, 1794
- Cassida hemisphaerica Herbst, 1799
- Cassida nobilis Linnaeus, 1758
- Cassida prasina Illiger, 1798
- Cassida rubiginosa Müller, 1776
- Cassida sanguinosa Suffrian, 1844
- Cassida vibex Linnaeus, 1767
- Cassida viridis Linnaeus, 1758
- Oomorphus concolor (Sturm, 1807)

==== Family Cleridae (chequered beetles) ====
- Thanasimus formicarius (Linnaeus, 1758)
- Necrobia ruficollis (Fabricius, 1775)
- Necrobia rufipes (DeGeer, 1775)
- Necrobia violacea (Linnaeus, 1758)
- Tillus elongatus (Linnaeus, 1758)

==== Family Colydiidae (cylindrical bark beetles) ====
- Pycnomerus depressiusculus (White, 1846)
- Pycnomerus fuliginosus Erichson, 1842

==== Family Corylophidae (minute fungus beetles) ====
- Corylophus cassidoides (Marsham, 1802)
- Corylophus sublaevipennis Jacquelin du Val, 1859
- Orthoperus atomus (Gyllenhal, 1808)
- Orthoperus nigrescens Stephens, 1829
- Sericoderus lateralis (Gyllenhal, 1827)

==== Family Endomychidae (handsome fungus beetles) ====
- Endomychus coccineus (Linnaeus, 1758)
- Mycetaea subterranea (Fabricius, 1801)

==== Family Phloiophilidae ====
- Phloiophilus edwardsi (Stephens, 1830)

==== Family Trogossitidae ====
- Tenebroides mauritanicus (Linnaeus, 1758)
- Thymalus limbatus (Fabricius, 1787)

==== Family Ciidae (minute tree-fungus beetles) ====
- Cis bidentatus (Olivier, 1790)
- Cis boleti (Scopoli, 1763)
- Cis fagi Waltl, 1839
- Cis hispidus (Paykull, 1798)
- Cis nitidus (Fabricius, 1792)
- Cis setiger Mellié, 1848
- Ennearthron cornutum (Gyllenhal, 1827)
- Octotemnus glabriculus (Gyllenhal, 1827)
- Orthocis alni (Gyllenhal, 1813)
- Orthocis festivus (Panzer, 1793)
- Orthocis vestitus Mellié, 1848

==== Family Coccinellidae (ladybirds) ====
- Chilocorus bipustulatus (Linnaeus, 1758)
- Coccidula rufa (Herbst, 1783)
- Rhyzobius litura (Fabricius, 1787)
- Adalia bipunctata (Linnaeus, 1758)
- Adalia decempunctata (Linnaeus, 1758)
- Henosepilachna argus (Geoffory in Fourcroy, 1762)
- Anatis ocellata (Linnaeus, 1758)
- Anisosticta novemdecimpunctata (Linnaeus, 1758)
- Aphidecta obliterata (Linnaeus, 1758)
- Calvia quatuordecimguttata (Linnaeus, 1758)
- Coccinella hieroglyphica Linnaeus, 1758
- Coccinella septempunctata Linnaeus, 1758
- Coccinella undecimpunctata Linnaeus, 1758
- Halyzia sedecimguttata (Linnaeus, 1758)
- Hippodamia tredecimpunctata (Linnaeus, 1758)
- Myrrha octodecimguttata (Linnaeus, 1758)
- Myzia oblongoguttata (Linnaeus, 1758)
- Propylea quatuordecimpunctata (Linnaeus, 1758)
- Psyllobora vigintiduopunctata (Linnaeus, 1758)
- Tytthaspis sedecimpunctata (Linnaeus, 1761)
- Subcoccinella vigintiquatuorpunctata (Linnaeus, 1758)
- Hyperaspis pseudopustulata Mulsant, 1853
- Nephus quadrimaculatus (Herbst, 1783)
- Nephus redtenbacheri (Mulsant, 1846)
- Scymnus auritus Thunberg, 1795
- Scymnus limbatus Stephens, 1832
- Scymnus suturalis Thunberg, 1795
- Scymnus nigrinus Kugelann, 1794
- Scymnus schmidti Fürsch, 1967

==== Family Cryptophagidae (silken fungus beetles) ====
Subfamily Atomariinae

- Atomaria lewisi Reitter, 1877
- Atomaria procerula Erichson, 1846
- Atomaria atricapilla Stephens, 1830
- Atomaria apicalis Erichson, 1846
- Atomaria basalis Erichson, 1846
- Atomaria clavigera Ganglbauer, 1899
- Atomaria fuscata (Schönherr, 1808)
- Atomaria fuscipes (Gyllenhal, 1808)
- Atomaria gutta Newman, 1834
- Atomaria mesomela (Herbst, 1792)
- Atomaria munda Erichson, 1846
- Atomaria nitidula (Marsham, 1802)
- Atomaria peltata Kraatz, 1853
- Atomaria pusilla (Paykull, 1798)
- Atomaria rubella Heer, 1841
- Atomaria rubricollis Brisout, 1863
- Atomaria testacea Stephens, 1830
- Atomaria zetterstedti (Zetterstedt, 1838)
- Atomaria turgida Erichson, 1846
- Atomaria barani Brisout, 1863
- Atomaria fimetarii (Fabricius, 1792)
- Atomaria linearis Stephens, 1830
- Atomaria nigrirostris Stephens, 1830
- Atomaria nigriventris Stephens, 1830
- Atomaria strandi Johnson, 1967
- Atomaria umbrina (Gyllenhal, 1827)
- Atomaria wollastoni Sharp, 1867
- Ephistemus globulus (Paykull, 1798)
- Ootypus globosus (Waltl, 1838)

Subfamily Cryptophaginae

- Antherophagus canescens Grouvelle, 1916
- Antherophagus nigricornis (Fabricius, 1787)
- Antherophagus pallens (Linnaeus, 1758)
- Caenoscelis ferruginea (Sahlberg, 1820)
- Cryptophagus acutangulus (Gyllenhal, 1827)
- Cryptophagus cellaris (Scopoli, 1763)
- Cryptophagus dentatus (Herbst, 1793)
- Cryptophagus distinguendus Sturm, 1845
- Cryptophagus laticollis Lucas, 1846
- Cryptophagus lycoperdi (Scopoli, 1763)
- Cryptophagus pallidus Sturm, 1845
- Cryptophagus pilosus Gyllenhal, 1827
- Cryptophagus pseudodentatus Bruce, 1934
- Cryptophagus pubescens Sturm, 1845
- Cryptophagus ruficornis Stephens, 1830
- Cryptophagus saginatus Sturm, 1845
- Cryptophagus scanicus (Linnaeus, 1758)
- Cryptophagus schmidti Sturm, 1845
- Cryptophagus scutellatus Newman, 1834
- Cryptophagus setulosus Sturm, 1845
- Cryptophagus subfumatus Kraatz, 1856
- Henoticus californicus (Mannerheim, 1843)
- Henoticus serratus (Gyllenhal, 1808)
- Micrambe bimaculata (Panzer, 1798)
- Micrambe villosa (Heer, 1841)
- Micrambe vini (Panzer, 1797)
- Paramecosoma melanocephalum (Herbst, 1793)
- Telmatophilus caricis (Olivier, 1790)
- Telmatophilus schoenherrii (Gyllenhal, 1808)
- Telmatophilus typhae (Fallén, 1802)

==== Family Curculionidae (true weevils) ====
Subfamily Baridinae

- Parethelcus pollinarius (Forster, 1771)

Subfamily Entiminae

- Alophus triguttatus (Fabricius, 1792)
- Attacta plumbeus (Marsham, 1802)
- Barynotus moerens (Fabricius, 1792)
- Barynotus obscurus (Fabricius, 1775)
- Barynotus squamosus Germar, 1824
- Barypeithes araneiformis (Schrank, 1781)
- Barypeithes curvimanus (Jacquelin du Val, 1855)
- Barypeithes pellucidus (Boheman, 1834)
- Barypeithes pyrenaeus Seidlitz, 1868
- Barypeithes sulcifrons (Boheman, 1843)
- Brachysomus echinatus (Bonsdorff, 1785)
- Caenopsis fissirostris (Walton, 1847)
- Caenopsis waltoni (Boheman, 1843)
- Liophloeus tessulatus (Müller, 1776)
- Neliocarus nebulosus Stephens, 1831
- Neliocarus sus Stephens, 1831
- Otiorhynchus arcticus (Fabricius, 1780)
- Otiorhynchus atroapterus (DeGeer, 1775)
- Otiorhynchus auropunctatus Gyllenhal, 1834
- Otiorhynchus clavipes (Bonsdorff, 1785)
- Otiorhynchus desertus Rosenhauer, 1847
- Otiorhynchus ligneus (Olivier, 1807)
- Otiorhynchus nodosus (Müller, 1764)
- Otiorhynchus ovatus (Linnaeus, 1758)
- Otiorhynchus porcatus (Herbst, 1795)
- Otiorhynchus rugifrons (Gyllenhal, 1813)
- Otiorhynchus rugostriatus (Goeze, 1777)
- Otiorhynchus singularis (Linnaeus, 1767)
- Otiorhynchus sulcatus (Fabricius, 1775)
- Otiorhynchus uncinatus Germar, 1824
- Philopedon plagiatum (Schaller, 1783)
- Phyllobius argentatus (Linnaeus, 1758)
- Phyllobius glaucus (Scopoli 1763)
- Phyllobius maculicornis Germar, 1824
- Phyllobius oblongus (Linnaeus, 1758)
- Phyllobius pomaceus Gyllenhal, 1834
- Phyllobius pyri (Linnaeus, 1758)
- Phyllobius roboretanus Gredler, 1882
- Phyllobius virideaeris (Laicharting 1781)
- Polydrusus cervinus (Linnaeus, 1758)
- Polydrusus mollis (Ström, 1768)
- Polydrusus pilosus Gredler, 1866
- Polydrusus pterygomalis Boheman, 1840
- Polydrusus pulchellus Stephens, 1831
- Polydrusus tereticollis (DeGeer 1775)
- Polydrusus tereticollis (De Geer 1775)
- Polydrusus formosus (Mayer, 1779)
- Sciaphilus asperatus (Bonsdorff, 1785)
- Sitona ambiguus Gyllenhal, 1834
- Sitona cylindricollis Fåhraeus 1840
- Sitona griseus (Fabricius, 1775)
- Sitona hispidulus (Fabricius, 1777)
- Sitona lepidus Gyllenhal, 1834
- Sitona lineatus (Linnaeus, 1758)
- Sitona lineellus (Bonsdorff, 1785)
- Sitona macularius (Marsham 1802)
- Sitona ononidis Sharp, 1866
- Sitona puberulus Reitter, 1903
- Sitona puncticollis Stephens, 1831
- Sitona regensteinensis (Herbst, 1797)
- Sitona striatellus Gyllenhal, 1834
- Sitona sulcifrons (Thunberg, 1798)
- Sitona suturalis Stephens, 1831
- Sitona waterhousei Walton, 1846
- Strophosoma capitatum (DeGeer, 1775)
- Strophosoma melanogrammum (Forster, 1771)
- Trachyphloeus angustisetulus Hansen, 1915
- Trachyphloeus asperatus Boheman 1843
- Trachyphloeus scabriculus (Linnaeus, 1771)
- Tropiphorus obtusus (Bonsdorff, 1785)
- Tropiphorus terricola (Newman, 1838)

Subfamily Hyperinae

- Hypera arator (Linnaeus, 1758)
- Hypera dauci (Olivier, 1807)
- Hypera fuscocinerea (Marsham, 1802)
- Hypera nigrirostris (Fabricius, 1775)
- Hypera plantaginis (DeGeer, 1775)
- Hypera pollux (Fabricius 1801)
- Hypera postica (Gyllenhal, 1813)
- Hypera rumicis (Linnaeus, 1758)
- Hypera suspiciosa (Herbst, 1795)
- Hypera venusta (Fabricius, 1781)
- Hypera zoilus (Scopoli, 1763)

Subfamily Cossoninae

- Euophryum confine (Broun, 1881)
- Euophryum rufum (Broun, 1880)
- Pentarthrum huttoni Wollaston, 1854
- Pselactus spadix (Herbst, 1795)
- Pseudophloeophagus aeneopiceus Boheman, 1845
- Rhopalomesites tardyi (Curtis, 1825)

Subfamily Curculioninae

- Acalles misellus Boheman, 1844
- Acalles ptinoides (Marsham, 1802)
- Acalles roboris Curtis, 1835
- Anoplus plantaris (Naezen, 1794)
- Anoplus roboris Suffrian, 1840
- Anthonomus bituberculatus Thomson, 1868
- Anthonomus brunnipennis Curtis, 1840
- Anthonomus pedicularius (Linnaeus, 1758)
- Anthonomus pomorum (Linnaeus, 1758)
- Anthonomus rubi (Herbst, 1795)
- Anthonomus rufus Gyllenhal, 1836
- Anthonomus ulmi (DeGeer, 1775)
- Archarius pyrrhoceras Marsham, 1802
- Archarius salicivorus Paykull, 1792
- Bagous brevis Gyllenhal, 1836
- Bagous collignensis (Herbst, 1797)
- Bagous glabrirostris (Herbst, 1795)
- Bagous limosus (Gyllenhal, 1827)
- Bagous lutulentus (Gyllenhal, 1813)
- Bagous alismatis (Marsham, 1802)
- Calosirus terminatus (Herbst, 1795)
- Ceutorhynchus cakilis (Hansen, 1917)
- Ceutorhynchus chalybaeus Germar, 1824
- Ceutorhynchus cochleariae (Gyllenhal, 1813)
- Ceutorhynchus erysimi (Fabricius, 1787)
- Ceutorhynchus hirtulus Germar, 1824
- Ceutorhynchus minutus (Reich 1797)
- Ceutorhynchus obstrictus (Marsham, 1802)
- Ceutorhynchus pallidactylus (Marsham, 1802)
- Ceutorhynchus pyrrhorhynchus (Marsham, 1802)
- Ceutorhynchus typhae (Herbst 1795)
- Ceutorhynchus unguicularis Thomson, C.G 1871
- Cionus alauda (Herbst, 1784)
- Cionus hortulanus (Geoffroy, 1785)
- Cionus scrophulariae (Linnaeus 1758)
- Cleonis pigra (Scopoli, 1763)
- Cleopus pulchellus (Herbst, 1795)
- Coeliodes rana (Fabricius 1787)
- Coeliodes ruber (Marsham, 1802)
- Coeliodes transversealbofasciatus (Goeze 1777)
- Cryptorhynchus lapathi (Linnaeus, 1758)
- Curculio betulae (Stephens, 1831)
- Dorytomus hirtipennis Bedel 1884
- Dorytomus melanophthalmus (Paykull, 1792)
- Dorytomus rufatus (Bedel, 1888)
- Dorytomus taeniatus (Fabricius, 1781)
- Dorytomus tortrix (Linnaeus, 1761)
- Ellescus bipunctatus (Linnaeus, 1758)
- Eubrychius velutus (Beck, 1817)
- Glocianus distinctus Brisout, 1870
- Glocianus punctiger (Sahlberg, 1835)
- Gymnetron antirrhini (Paykull, 1800)
- Gymnetron beccabungae (Linnaeus, 1761)
- Gymnetron labile (Herbst, 1795)
- Gymnetron pascuorum (Gyllenhal, 1813)
- Gymnetron villosulum Gyllenhal, 1838
- Hylobius abietis (Linnaeus, 1758)
- Leiosoma deflexum (Panzer, 1795)
- Leiosoma oblongulum Boheman, 1842
- Leiosoma troglodytes (Rye, 1873)
- Limnobaris dolorosa (Goeze, 1777)
- Magdalis armigera (Geoffroy, 1785)
- Magdalis carbonaria (Linnaeus, 1758)
- Mecinus collaris Germar, 1821
- Mecinus pyraster (Herbst, 1795)
- Miarus campanulae (Linnaeus, 1767)
- Micrelus ericae (Gyllenhal, 1813)
- Nedyus quadrimaculatus (Linnaeus, 1758)
- Orchestes alni (Linnaeus, 1758)
- Orchestes calceatus (Germar, 1821)
- Orchestes fagi (Linnaeus, 1758)
- Orchestes foliorum (Müller, 1764)
- Orchestes pilosus (Fabricius, 1781)
- Orchestes quercus (Linnaeus, 1758)
- Orchestes rusci (Herbst, 1795)
- Orchestes testaceus (Müller, 1776)
- Orobitis cyaneus (Linnaeus, 1758)
- Orthochaetes insignis (Aubé, 1863)
- Orthochaetes setiger (Beck, 1817)
- Pelenomus canaliculatus (Fåhraeus, 1843)
- Pelenomus comari (Herbst, 1795)
- Pelenomus quadrituberculatus (Fabricius, 1787)
- Phytobius leucogaster (Marsham, 1802)
- Pissodes castaneus (DeGeer, 1775)
- Pissodes pini (Linnaeus, 1758)
- Poophagus sisymbrii (Fabricius, 1777)
- Rhamphus oxyacanthae (Marsham, 1802)
- Rhamphus pulicarius (Herbst, 1795)
- Rhinoncus castor (Fabricius, 1792)
- Rhinoncus inconspectus (Herbst, 1795)
- Rhinoncus pericarpius (Linnaeus, 1758)
- Rhinoncus perpendicularis (Reich, 1797)
- Sirocalodes mixtus (Mulsant & Rey, 1858)
- Stenocarus ruficornis (Stephens, 1831)
- Syagrius intrudens Waterhouse, 1903
- Tachyerges salicis (Linnaeus, 1758)
- Tachyerges stigma (Germar, 1821)
- Tanysphyrus lemnae (Paykull, 1792)
- Thamiocolus viduatus (Gyllenhal, 1813)
- Trichosirocalus dawsoni (Brisout, 1869)
- Trichosirocalus troglodytes (Fabricius, 1787)
- Tychius junceus (Reich, 1797)
- Tychius picirostris (Fabricius, 1787)
- Tychius squamulatus Gyllenhal, 1836
- Tychius stephensi Gyllenhal, 1836
- Tychius tibialis Boheman, 1843

Subfamily Molytinae

- Liparus coronatus (Goeze 1777)

Subfamily Scolytinae

- Dryocoetes autographus (Ratzeburg, 1837)
- Dryocoetes villosus (Fabricius 1792)
- Hylastes brunneus Erichson, 1836
- Hylastes cunicularius Erichson, 1836
- Hylastes opacus Erichson, 1836
- Hylastinus obscurus (Marsham, 1802)
- Hylesinus crenatus (Fabricius, 1787)
- Hylesinus fraxini (Panzer 1779)
- Hylurgops palliatus (Gyllenhal, 1813)
- Orthotomicus laricis (Fabricius, 1792)
- Phloeotribus rhododactylus (Marsham, 1802)
- Pityogenes bidentatus (Herbst, 1783)
- Pityophthorus pubescens (Marsham, 1802)
- Pteleobius vittatus Fabricius, 1787
- Scolytus multistriatus (Marsham, 1802)
- Scolytus scolytus (Fabricius, 1775)
- Tomicus piniperda (Linnaeus, 1758)
- Trypodendron domesticum (Linnaeus, 1758)
- Trypophloeus asperatus (Gyllenhal, 1813)

==== Family Attelabidae (leaf-rolling weevils) ====
- Apoderus coryli (Linnaeus, 1758)

==== Family Erirhinidae (wetland weevils) ====
- Grypus equiseti (Fabricius, 1775)
- Notaris acridulus (Linnaeus, 1758)
- Notaris aethiops (Fabricius, 1792)
- Notaris scirpi (Fabricius, 1792)
- Thryogenes festucae (Herbst, 1795)
- Thryogenes nereis (Paykull, 1800)
- Tournotaris bimaculata (Fabricius, 1787)

==== Family Dryophthoridae (palm weevils) ====
- Sitophilus granarius (Linnaeus, 1758)
- Sitophilus zeamais (Motschulsky), 1855
- Sitophilus oryzae (Linnaeus, 1763)

==== Family Cerylonidae ====
- Cerylon fagi Brisout, 1867
- Cerylon ferrugineum Stephens, 1830
- Cerylon histeroides (Fabricius, 1792)

==== Family Erotylidae (pleasing fungus beetles) ====
- Dacne bipustulata (Thunberg, 1781)

==== Family Kateretidae (short-winged flower beetles) ====
- Brachypterus glaber (Stephens, 1835)
- Brachypterus urticae (Fabricius, 1792)
- Kateretes pedicularius (Linnaeus, 1758)
- Kateretes pusillus Thunberg, 1794
- Kateretes rufilabris (Latreille, 1807)

==== Family Laemophloeidae (lined flat bark beetles) ====
- Cryptolestes ferrugineus (Stephens, 1831)
- Cryptolestes pusillus (Schönherr, 1817)

==== Family Latridiidae (minute brown scavenger beetles) ====
Subfamily Corticariinae

- Corticaria crenulata (Gyllenhal, 1827)
- Corticaria elongata (Gyllenhal, 1827)
- Corticaria ferruginea Marsham, 1802
- Corticaria fulva (Comolli, 1837)
- Corticaria impressa (Olivier, 1790)
- Corticaria inconspicua Wollaston, 1860
- Corticaria punctulata (Marsham, 1802)
- Corticaria serrata (Paykull, 1798)
- Corticaria umbilicata (Beck, 1817)
- Corticarina fuscula (Gyllenhal, 1827)
- Corticarina similata (Gyllenhal, 1827)
- Cortinicara gibbosa (Herbst, 1793)
- Melanophthalma transversalis auctt.

Subfamily Latridiinae

- Adistemia watsoni (Wollaston, 1871)
- Cartodere bifasciata (Reitter, 1877)
- Cartodere nodifer (Westwood, 1839)
- Dienerella filiformis (Gyllenhal, 1827)
- Dienerella filum (Aubé, 1850)
- Dienerella ruficollis (Marsham, 1802)
- Enicmus histrio Joy & Tomlin, 1910
- Enicmus testaceus (Stephens, 1830)
- Enicmus transversus (Olivier, 1790)
- Latridius anthracinus Mannerheim, 1844
- Latridius minutus (Linnaeus, 1767)
- Latridius pseudominutus (Strand, 1958)
- Stephostethus lardarius (DeGeer, 1775)
- Thes bergrothi (Reitter, 1880)

==== Family Lymexylidae (ship-timber beetles) ====
- Hylecoetus dermestoides (Linnaeus, 1761)

==== Family Melandryidae (false darkling beetles) ====
Subfamily Hallomeninae

- Hallomenus binotatus (Quensel, 1790)

Subfamily Melandryinae

- Abdera flexuosa (Paykull, 1799)
- Melandrya caraboides (Linnaeus, 1761)
- Orchesia micans (Panzer, 1791)
- Orchesia minor Walker, 1837
- Orchesia undulata Kraatz, 1853

Subfamily Osphyinae

- Conopalpus testaceus (Olivier, 1790)

==== Family Mycetophagidae (hairy fungus beetles) ====
- Litargus connexus (Geoffroy, 1785)
- Typhaea stercorea (Linnaeus, 1758)

==== Family Pyrochroidae (fire-coloured beetles) ====
- Pyrochroa serraticornis (Scopoli, 1763)

==== Family Salpingidae (narrow-waisted bark beetles) ====
Subfamily Agleninae

- Aglenus brunneus (Gyllenhal, 1813)

Subfamily Salpinginae

- Lissodema denticolle (Gyllenhal, 1813)
- Lissodema quadripustulata (Marsham, 1802)nec (Fabricius, 1775)
- Rabocerus foveolatus (Ljungh, 1823)
- Rabocerus gabrieli (Gerhardt, 1901)
- Salpingus planirostris (Fabricius, 1787)
- Salpingus ruficollis (Linnaeus, 1761)
- Sphaeriestes ater (Paykull, 1798)
- Sphaeriestes castaneus (Panzer, 1796)
- Sphaeriestes reyi (Abeille de Perrin, 1874)
- Vincenzellus ruficollis (Panzer, 1794)

==== Family Tetratomidae (polypore fungus beetles) ====
- Tetratoma ancora Fabricius, 1790
- Tetratoma fungorum Fabricius, 1790

==== Family Tenebrionidae (darkling beetles) ====
Subfamily Alleculinae

- Gonodera luperus (Herbst, 1783)

Subfamily Diaperinae

- Crypticus quisquilius (Linnaeus, 1761)
- Gnatocerus cornutus (Fabricius, 1798)
- Phaleria cadaverina (Fabricius, 1792)

Subfamily Lagriinae

- Lagria hirta (Linnaeus, 1758)

Subfamily Tenebrioninae

- Alphitobius diaperinus (Panzer, 1797)
- Blaps lethifera Marsham, 1802
- Blaps mucronata Latreille, 1804
- Melanimon tibialis (Fabricius, 1781)
- Nalassus laevioctostriatus (Goeze, 1777)
- Opatrum sabulosum (Linnaeus, 1761)
- Palorus ratzeburgi (Wissmann, 1848)
- Palorus subdepressus (Wollaston, 1864)
- Phylan gibbus (Fabricius, 1775)
- Tenebrio molitor Linnaeus, 1758
- Tenebrio obscurus Fabricius, 1792
- Tribolium castaneum (Herbst, 1797)
- Tribolium confusum Jacquelin du Val, 1863
- Xanthomus pallidus (Curtis, 1830)

==== Family Meloidae (blister beetles) ====
- Lytta vesicatoria (Linnaeus, 1758)
- Meloe proscarabaeus Linnaeus, 1758
- Meloe violaceus Marsham, 1802

==== Family Melyridae (soft-wing flower beetles) ====
Subfamily Dasytinae

- Dasytes aeratus (Stephens, 1830)
- Psilothrix viridicoeruleus (Geoffroy, 1785)

Subfamily Malachiinae

- Anthocomus fasciatus (Linnaeus, 1758)
- Malachius bipustulatus (Linnaeus, 1758)

==== Family Mordellidae (tumbling flower beetles) ====
- Mordellistena neuwaldeggiana (Panzer, 1796)

==== Family Monotomidae (root-eating beetles) ====
- Monotoma angusticollis (Stephens, 1835)
- Monotoma angusticollis (Gyllenhal, 1827)
- Monotoma bicolor Villa, 1835
- Monotoma conicicollis Aubé, 1837
- Monotoma longicollis (Gyllenhal, 1827)
- Monotoma picipes Herbst, 1793
- Monotoma spinicollis Aubé, 1837
- Monotoma quadricollis Aubé, 1837
- Rhizophagus cribratus Gyllenhal, 1827
- Rhizophagus depressus (Fabricius, 1792)
- Rhizophagus dispar (Paykull, 1800)
- Rhizophagus ferrugineus (Paykull, 1800)
- Rhizophagus parallelocollis Gyllenhal, 1827
- Rhizophagus perforatus Erichson, 1845

==== Family Nitidulidae (sap beetles) ====
Subfamily Carpophilinae

- Carpophilus hemipterus (Linnaeus, 1758)
- Epuraea adumbrata Mannerheim, 1852
- Epuraea aestiva (Linnaeus, 1758)
- Epuraea angustula Sturm, 1844
- Epuraea deleta Erichson, 1843
- Epuraea longula Erichson, 1845
- Epuraea marseuli Reitter, 1872
- Epuraea melanocephala (Marsham, 1802)
- Epuraea melina Erichson, 1843
- Epuraea pallescens (Stephens, 1832)
- Epuraea rufomarginata (Stephens, 1830)
- Epuraea silacea (Herbst, 1784)
- Epuraea thoracica Tournier, 1872
- Epuraea unicolor (Olivier, 1790)

Subfamily Cryptarchinae

- Glischrochilus hortensis (Geoffroy, 1785)
- Glischrochilus quadriguttatus (Fabricius, 1776)
- Glischrochilus quadripunctatus (Linnaeus, 1758)
- Pityophagus ferrugineus (Linnaeus, 1761)

Subfamily Meligethinae

- Laria dulcamarae Scopoli, 1763
- Meligethes aeneus (Fabricius, 1775)
- Meligethes atratus (Olivier, 1790)
- Meligethes bidens Brisout, 1863
- Meligethes brunnicornis Sturm, 1845
- Meligethes carinulatus Förster, 1849
- Meligethes difficilis (Heer, 1841)
- Meligethes exilis Sturm, 1845
- Meligethes flavimanus Stephens, 1830
- Meligethes nigrescens Stephens, 1830
- Meligethes obscurus Erichson, 1845
- Meligethes ovatus Sturm, 1845
- Meligethes pedicularius (Gyllenhal, 1808)
- Meligethes persicus Faldermann, 1837
- Meligethes ruficornis (Marsham, 1802)
- Meligethes viridescens (Fabricius, 1787)

Subfamily Nitidulinae

- Cychramus luteus (Fabricius, 1787)
- Nitidula bipunctata (Linnaeus, 1758)
- Omosita colon (Linnaeus, 1758)
- Omosita depressa (Linnaeus, 1758)
- Omosita discoidea (Fabricius, 1775)
- Pocadius ferrugineus (Fabricius, 1775)
- Soronia grisea (Linnaeus, 1758)
- Soronia punctatissima (Illiger, 1794)

==== Family Oedemeridae (pollen-feeding beetles) ====
- Ischnomera sanguinicollis (Fabricius, 1787)
- Nacerdes melanura (Linnaeus, 1758)
- Oedemera lurida (Marsham, 1802)

==== Family Phalacridae (shining flower beetles) ====
- Olibrus aeneus (Fabricius, 1792)
- Olibrus aeneus (Fabricius, 1792)
- Olibrus liquidus Erichson, 1845
- Phalacrus caricis Sturm, 1807
- Phalacrus corruscus (Panzer, 1797)
- Phalacrus substriatus Gyllenhal, 1813

==== Family Rhynchitidae (tooth-nosed snout weevils) ====
- Deporaus betulae (Linnaeus, 1758)
- Neocoenorrhinus aeneovirens (Marsham, 1802)
- Neocoenorrhinus germanicus (Herbst, 1797)
- Rhynchites olivaceus (Gyllenhal, 1833)
- Temnocerus tomentosus (Gyllenhal, 1839)

==== Family Ripiphoridae (wedge-shaped beetles) ====
- Metoecus paradoxus (Linnaeus, 1761)

==== Family Scraptiidae (false flower beetles) ====
- Anaspis fasciata (Forster, 1771)
- Anaspis frontalis (Linnaeus, 1758)
- Anaspis garneysi Fowler, 1889
- Anaspis lurida Stephens, 1832
- Anaspis maculata Geoffroy, 1785
- Anaspis regimbarti Schilsky, 1895
- Anaspis rufilabris (Gyllenhal, 1827)
- Anaspis thoracica (Linnaeus, 1758)

==== Family Sphindidae (dry-fungus beetles) ====
- Aspidiphorus orbiculatus (Gyllenhal, 1808)

==== Family Silvanidae (silvan flat bark beetles) ====
- Rhyzopertha dominica (Fabricius, 1792)
- Oryzaephilus surinamensis (Linnaeus, 1758)

=== Infraorder Elateriformia ===
==== Family Dascillidae ====
- Dascillus cervinus (Linnaeus, 1758)

==== Family Byrrhidae (pill beetles) ====
- Byrrhus arietinus Steffahny, 1842
- Byrrhus fasciatus (Forster, 1771)
- Byrrhus pilula (Linnaeus, 1758)
- Byrrhus pustulatus (Forster, 1771)
- Cytilus sericeus (Forster, 1771)
- Morychus aeneus (Fabricius, 1775)
- Simplocaria semistriata (Fabricius, 1794)

==== Family Dryopidae (long-toed water beetles) ====
- Dryops ernesti Des Gozis, 1886
- Dryops luridus (Erichson, 1847)
- Dryops similaris Bollow, 1936

==== Family Elmidae (riffle beetles) ====
- Elmis aenea (Müller, 1806)
- Esolus parallelepipedus (Müller, 1806)
- Limnius volckmari (Panzer, 1793)
- Oulimnius tuberculatus (Müller, 1806)

==== Family Heteroceridae (variegated mud-loving beetles) ====
- Augyles maritimus (Guérin-Méneville, 1844)
- Heterocerus fenestratus (Thunberg, 1784)
- Heterocerus flexuosus Stephens, 1828
- Heterocerus fossor Kiesenwetter, 1843
- Heterocerus marginatus (Fabricius, 1787)

==== Family Elateridae (click beetles) ====
- Agrypnus murinus (Linnaeus, 1758)
- Actenicerus sjaelandicus (Müller, 1764)
- Aplotarsus incanus (Gyllenhal, 1827)
- Athous campyloides Newman, 1833
- Athous haemorrhoidalis (Fabricius, 1801)
- Athous subfuscus (Müller, O.F 1764)
- Calambus bipustulatus (Linnaeus, 1767)
- Ctenicera cuprea (Fabricius, 1775)
- Denticollis linearis (Linnaeus, 1758)
- Hemicrepidius hirtus (Herbst, 1784)
- Prosternon tessellatum (Linnaeus, 1758)
- Selatosomus aeneus (Linnaeus, 1758)
- Selatosomus melancholicus (Fabricius, 1798)
- Adrastus pallens (Fabricius, 1792)
- Agriotes lineatus (Linnaeus, 1767)
- Agriotes obscurus (Linnaeus, 1758)
- Agriotes pallidulus (Illiger, 1807)
- Ampedus balteatus (Linnaeus, 1758)
- Ampedus pomonae (Stephens, 1830)
- Ampedus pomorum (Herbst, 1784)
- Dalopius marginatus (Linnaeus, 1758)
- Melanotus villosus (Geoffroy, 1785)
- Sericus brunneus (Linnaeus, 1758)
- Hypnoidus riparius (Fabricius, 1792)
- Zorochros minimus (Lacordaire, 1835)

==== Family Cantharidae (soldier beetles / leatherwings) ====
- Cantharis cryptica (Ashe, 1947)
- Cantharis figurata Mannerheim, 1843
- Cantharis lateralis Linnaeus, 1758
- Cantharis nigra (DeGeer, 1774)
- Cantharis nigricans (Müller, O.F 1776)
- Cantharis pallida Goeze, 1777
- Cantharis paludosa Fallén, 1807
- Cantharis pellucida Fabricius, 1792
- Cantharis rufa Linnaeus, 1758
- Cantharis thoracica (Olivier, 1790)
- Crudosilis ruficollis (Fabricius, 1775)
- Podabrus alpinus (Paykull, 1798)
- Rhagonycha femoralis (Brullé, 1832)
- Rhagonycha fulva (Scopoli, 1763)
- Rhagonycha lignosa (Müller, 1764)
- Rhagonycha lutea (Müller, 1764)
- Rhagonycha translucida (Krynicki, 1832)
- Malthinus balteatus Suffrian, 1851
- Malthinus punctatus (Geoffroy, 1785)
- Malthinus seriepunctatus Kiesenwetter, 1852
- Malthodes dispar (Germar, 1824)
- Malthodes flavoguttatus Kiesenwetter, 1852
- Malthodes fuscus (Waltl, 1838)
- Malthodes guttifer Kiesenwetter, 1852
- Malthodes marginatus (Latreille, 1806)
- Malthodes minimus (Linnaeus, 1758)
- Malthodes pumilus (Brébisson, 1835)

==== Family Eucnemidae (false click beetles) ====
- Melasis buprestoides (Linnaeus, 1761)

==== Family Lycidae ====
- Pyropterus nigroruber (DeGeer, 1774)

==== Throscidae (false metallic wood-boring beetles) ====
- Trixagus dermestoides (Linnaeus, 1767)

==== Family Clambidae (minute beetle or fringe-winged beetles) ====
- Calyptomerus dubius (Marsham, 1802)
- Clambus armadillo (DeGeer, 1774)
- Clambus evae Endrödi-Younga, 1960
- Clambus pallidulus Reitter, 1911
- Clambus pubescens Redtenbacher, 1849
- Clambus punctulus (Beck, 1817)

==== Family Scirtidae (marsh beetles) ====
- Cyphon coarctatus Paykull, 1799
- Cyphon hilaris Nyholm, 1944
- Cyphon kongsbergensis Munster, 1924
- Cyphon laevipennis Tournier, 1868
- Cyphon ochraceus Stephens, 1830
- Cyphon padi (Linnaeus, 1758)
- Cyphon palustris Thomson, C.G 1855
- Cyphon pubescens (Fabricius, 1792)
- Cyphon punctipennis Sharp, 1873
- Cyphon variabilis (Thunberg, 1787)
- Elodes elongata Tournier 1868
- Hydrocyphon deflexicollis (Müller, P.W.J 1821)
- Microcara testacea (Linnaeus, 1767)
- Odeles marginata (Fabricius, 1798)
- Prionocyphon serricornis (Müller, 1821)
- Scirtes hemisphaericus (Linnaeus, 1758)
- Scirtes orbicularis (Panzer, 1793)

=== Infraorder Scarabaeiformia (scarab beetles) ===
==== Family Scarabaeidae ====
- Aegialia arenaria (Fabricius, 1787)
- Aphodius ater (DeGeer, 1774)
- Aphodius borealis Gyllenhal, 1827
- Aphodius conspurcatus (Linnaeus, 1758)
- Aphodius constans Duftscmid, 1805
- Aphodius contaminatus (Herbst, 1783)
- Aphodius depressus (Kugelann, 1792)
- Aphodius erraticus (Linnaeus, 1758)
- Aphodius fasciatus (Olivier, 1789) nec (Linnaeus, 1758)
- Aphodius fimetarius (Linnaeus, 1758
- Aphodius foetens (Fabricius, 1787)
- Aphodius foetidus (Herbst, 1783)
- Aphodius fossor (Linnaeus, 1758)
- Aphodius granarius (Linnaeus, 1767)
- Aphodius ictericus (Laicharting, 1781)
- Aphodius lapponum Gyllenhal, 1806
- Aphodius luridus (Fabricius, 1775)
- Aphodius merdarius (Fabricius, 1775)
- Aphodius plagiatus (Linnaeus, 1767)
- Aphodius porcus (Fabricius, 1792)
- Aphodius prodromus (Brahm, 1790)
- Aphodius pusillus (Herbst, 1789)
- Aphodius rufipes (Linnaeus, 1758)
- Aphodius scybalarius (Fabricius, 1781)
- Aphodius sordidus (Fabricius, 1775)
- Aphodius sphacelatus (Panzer, 1798)
- Aphodius subterraneus (Linnaeus, 1758)
- Aphodius sticticus (Panzer 1798
- Cetonia aurata (Linnaeus, 1758
- Melolontha hippocastani Fabricius, 1801
- Melolontha melolontha (Linnaeus, 1758
- Serica brunnea (Linnaeus, 1758
- Phyllopertha horticola (Linnaeus, 1758
- Onthophagus nuchicornis (Linnaeus, 1758
- Onthophagus similis (Scriba, 1790

==== Family Trogidae ====
- Trox scaber (Linnaeus, 1767)

==== Family Geotrupidae (earth-boring dung beetles) ====
- Anoplotrupes stercorosus (Scriba, 1791)
- Geotrupes spiniger (Marsham, 1802)
- Geotrupes stercorarius (Linnaeus, 1758)
- Trypocopris vernalis (Linnaeus, 1758)
- Typhaeus typhoeus (Linnaeus, 1758)

==== Family Lucanidae ====
- Dorcus parallelipipedus (Linnaeus, 1758)
- Sinodendron cylindricum (Linnaeus, 1758)

=== Infraorder Staphyliniformia ===
==== Family Histeridae (clown beetles) ====
Subfamily Abraeinae

- Abraeus perpusillus (Marsham, 1802)
- Acritus nigricornis (Hoffmann, 1803)

Subfamily Histerinae

- Atholus duodecimstriatus (Schrank, 1781)
- Atholus bimaculatus (Linnaeus, 1758)
- Hister bisexstriatus Fabricius, 1801
- Hister unicolor Linnaeus, 1758
- Margarinotus brunneus (Fabricius, 1775)
- Margarinotus neglectus (Germar, 1813)
- Margarinotus purpurascens (Herbst, 1792)
- Margarinotus striola (Sahlberg, C.R 1819)
- Margarinotus ventralis (Marseul 1854)

Subfamily Onthophilinae

- Onthophilus striatus (Forster, 1771)

Subfamily Saprininae

- Carcinops pumilio (Erichson, 1834)
- Gnathoncus nannetensis (Marseul, 1862)
- Gnathoncus rotundatus (Kugelann, 1792)
- Hypocaccus dimidiatus (Illiger, 1807)subspecies maritimus (Stephens, 1830)
- Hypocaccus rugiceps (Duftschmid, 1805)
- Hypocaccus rugifrons (Paykull, 1798)
- Saprinus aeneus (Fabricius, 1775)
- Saprinus immundus (Gyllenhal, 1827)
- Saprinus semistriatus (Scriba, 1790)

==== Family Silphidae (large carrion beetles, burying beetles) ====
- Nicrophorus humator (Gleditsch, 1767)
- Nicrophorus interruptus Stephens, 1830
- Nicrophorus investigator Zetterstedt, 1824
- Nicrophorus vespillo (Linnaeus, 1758)
- Nicrophorus vespilloides Herbst, 1783
- Aclypea opaca (Linnaeus, 1758)
- Dendroxena quadrimaculata (Scopoli, 1772)
- Necrodes littoralis (Linnaeus, 1758)
- Phosphuga atrata (Linnaeus, 1758)subspecies subrotundata (Leach, 1817)
- Silpha tristis Illiger, 1798
- Silpha tyrolensis Laicharting, 1781
- Thanatophilus dispar (Herbst, 1793)
- Thanatophilus rugosus (Linnaeus, 1758)

==== Ptiliidae (featherwing beetles) ====
Subfamily Acrotrichinae

- Acrotrichis atomaria (DeGeer, 1774)
- Acrotrichis brevipennis (Erichson, 1845)
- Acrotrichis chevrolatii (Allibert, 1844)
- Acrotrichis cognata (Matthews, 1877)
- Acrotrichis danica Sundt, 1958
- Acrotrichis dispar (Matthews, 1865)
- Acrotrichis fascicularis (Herbst, 1793)
- Acrotrichis grandicollis (Mannerheim, 1844)
- Acrotrichis insularis (Mäklin, 1852)
- Acrotrichis intermedia (Gillmeister, 1845)
- Acrotrichis lucidula Rosskothen, 1935
- Acrotrichis montandonii (Allibert, 1844)
- Acrotrichis parva Rosskothen, 1935
- Acrotrichis rosskotheni Sundt, 1971
- Acrotrichis rugulosa Rosskothen, 1935
- Acrotrichis sericans (Heer, 1841)
- Acrotrichis sitkaensis (Motschulsky, 1845)
- Acrotrichis strandi Sundt, 1958
- Acrotrichis thoracica (Waltl, 1838)
- Baeocrara variolosa (Mulsant & Rey, 1873)
- Nephanes titan (Newman, 1834)

Subfamily Ptiliinae

- Actidium aterrimum (Motschulsky, 1845)
- Actidium coarctatum (Haliday, 1855)
- Actinopteryx fucicola (Allibert, 1844)
- Nossidium pilosellum (Marsham, 1802)
- Oligella foveolata (Allibert, 1844)
- Ptenidium formicetorum Kraatz, 1851
- Ptenidium fuscicorne Erichson, 1845
- Ptenidium intermedium Wankowicz, 1869
- Ptenidium laevigatum Erichson, 1845
- Ptenidium nitidum (Heer, 1841)
- Ptenidium punctatum (Gyllenhal, 1827)
- Ptenidium pusillum (Gyllenhal, 1808)
- Pteryx suturalis (Heer, 1841)
- Ptiliola kunzei (Heer, 1841)
- Ptiliolum fuscum (Erichson, 1845)
- Ptiliolum spencei (Allibert, 1844)
- Ptinella aptera (Guérin-Méneville, 1839)
- Ptinella cavelli (Broun, 1893)
- Ptinella denticollis (Fairmaire, 1858)
- Ptinella errabunda Johnson, 1975
- Ptinella limbata (Heer, 1841)
- Ptinella taylorae Johnson, 1977

==== Family Hydraenidae (minute moss beetles) ====
- Hydraena britteni (Joy, 1907)
- Hydraena flavipes Sturm 1836
- Hydraena gracilis Germar, 1824
- Hydraena nigrita Germar, 1824
- Hydraena pulchella Germar, 1824
- Hydraena pygmaea Waterhouse, 1833
- Hydraena riparia Kugelann, 1794
- Hydraena rufipes Curtis, 1830
- Hydraena testacea Curtis, 1830
- Limnebius nitidus (Marsham, 1802)
- Limnebius truncatellus (Thunberg, 1794)
- Enicocerus exsculptus (Germar, 1824)
- Ochthebius auriculatus Rey, 1886
- Ochthebius bicolon Germar, 1824
- Ochthebius dilatatus Stephens, 1829
- Ochthebius lejolisii Mulsant & Rey, 1861
- Ochthebius marinus (Paykull, 1798)
- Ochthebius minimus (Fabricius, 1792)
- Ochthebius punctatus Stephens, 1829
- Ochthebius viridis Peyron, 1858

==== Family Hydrophilidae (water scavenger beetles) ====
Subfamily Hydrophilinae

- Anacaena globulus (Paykull, 1798)
- Anacaena limbata (Fabricius, 1792)
- Anacaena lutescens (Stephens, 1829)
- Berosus luridus (Linnaeus, 1761)
- Berosus signaticollis (Charpentier, 1825)
- Chaetarthria seminulum (Herbst, 1797)
- Chaetarthria simillima Vorst & Cuppen, 2003
- Cymbiodyta marginellus (Fabricius, 1792)
- Enochrus affinis (Thunberg, 1794)
- Enochrus bicolor (Fabricius, 1792)
- Enochrus coarctatus (Gredler, 1863)
- Enochrus fuscipennis (Thomson, 1884)
- Enochrus halophilus (Bedel, 1878)
- Enochrus melanocephalus (Olivier, 1792)
- Enochrus ochropterus (Marsham, 1802)
- Enochrus testaceus (Fabricius, 1801)
- Helochares punctatus Sharp 1869
- Hydrobius fuscipes (Linnaeus, 1758)
- Laccobius atratus (Rottenberg, 1874)
- Laccobius bipunctatus (Fabricius, 1775)
- Laccobius colon (Stephens, 1829)
- Laccobius minutus (Linnaeus, 1758)
- Laccobius sinuatus Motschulsky, 1849
- Laccobius striatulus (Fabricius, 1801)
- Laccobius ytenensis Sharp, 1910
- Paracymus scutellaris (Rosenhauer, 1856)

Subfamily Sphaeridiinae

- Cercyon analis (Paykull, 1798)
- Cercyon convexiusculus Stephens, 1829
- Cercyon depressus Stephens, 1829
- Cercyon haemorrhoidalis (Fabricius, 1775)
- Cercyon impressus (Sturm, 1807)
- Cercyon lateralis (Marsham, 1802)
- Cercyon littoralis (Gyllenhal, 1808)
- Cercyon marinus Thomson, 1853
- Cercyon melanocephalus (Linnaeus, 1758)
- Cercyon nigriceps (Marsham, 1802)
- Cercyon obsoletus (Gyllenhal, 1808)
- Cercyon pygmaeus (Illiger, 1801)
- Cercyon quisquilius (Linnaeus, 1761)
- Cercyon sternalis (Sharp, 1918)
- Cercyon terminatus (Marsham, 1802)
- Cercyon tristis (Illiger, 1801)
- Cercyon unipunctatus (Linnaeus, 1758)
- Cercyon ustulatus (Preyssler, 1790)
- Coelostoma orbiculare (Fabricius, 1775)
- Cryptopleurum minutum (Fabricius, 1775)
- Cryptopleurum subtile Sharp, 1884
- Megasternum concinnum (Marsham, 1802)
- Sphaeridium lunatum Fabricius, 1792
- Sphaeridium marginatum Fabricius, 1787
- Sphaeridium scarabaeoides (Linnaeus, 1758)

==== Family Georissidae ====
- Georissus crenulatus (Rossi, 1794)

==== Family Hydrochidae ====
- Hydrochus brevis (Herbst, 1793)
- Hydrochus ignicollis Motschulsky, 1860

==== Family Helophoridae ====
- Helophorus aequalis Thomson, 1868
- Helophorus alternans Gené, 1836
- Helophorus arvernicus Mulsant, 1846
- Helophorus brevipalpis Bedel, 1881
- Helophorus flavipes Fabricius, 1792
- Helophorus fulgidicollis Motschulsky, 1860
- Helophorus grandis Illiger, 1798
- Helophorus granularis (Linnaeus, 1761)
- Helophorus griseus Herbst, 1793
- Helophorus minutus Fabricius, 1775
- Helophorus nanus Sturm, 1836
- Helophorus nubilus Fabricius, 1777
- Helophorus obscurus Mulsant, 1844
- Helophorus porculus Bedel, 1881
- Helophorus rufipes (Bosc d'Antic, 1791)
- Helophorus strigifrons Thomson, 1868

==== Family Leiodidae (round fungus beetles) ====
Subfamily Cholevinae

- Catops chrysomeloides (Panzer, 1798)
- Catops fuliginosus Erichson, 1837
- Catops fuscus (Panzer, 1794)
- Catops grandicollis Erichson, 1837
- Catops kirbii (Spence, 1815)
- Catops longulus Kellner, 1846
- Catops morio (Fabricius, 1787)
- Catops nigricans (Spence, 1815)
- Catops nigrita Erichson, 1837
- Catops tristis (Panzer, 1793)
- Choleva agilis (Illiger, 1798)
- Choleva angustata (Fabricius, 1781)
- Choleva cisteloides (Frölich, 1799)
- Nargus velox (Spence, 1815)
- Nargus wilkinii (Spence, 1815)
- Parabathyscia wollastoni (Jansen, 1857)
- Ptomaphagus medius Rey, 1889
- Ptomaphagus subvillosus (Goeze, 1777)
- Ptomaphagus variicornis (Rosenhauer, 1847)
- Sciodrepoides watsoni (Spence, 1815)

Subfamily Coloninae

- Colon angulare Erichson, 1837
- Colon appendiculatum (Sahlberg, 1822)
- Colon brunneum (Latreille, 1807)
- Colon dentipes (Sahlberg, 1822)
- Colon serripes (Sahlberg, 1822)
- Colon viennense Herbst, 1797

Subfamily Leiodinae

- Agathidium atrum (Paykull 1798)
- Agathidium confusum Brisout, 1863
- Agathidium convexum Sharp, 1866
- Agathidium laevigatum Erichson, 1845
- Agathidium marginatum Sturm, 1807
- Agathidium nigripenne (Fabricius, 1792)
- Agathidium rotundatum Gyllenhal, 1827
- Agathidium seminulum (Linnaeus, 1758)
- Agathidium varians Beck, 1817
- Amphicyllis globus (Fabricius, 1792)
- Anisotoma humeralis (Fabricius, 1792)
- Anisotoma orbicularis (Herbst, 1792)
- Colenis immunda (Sturm, 1807)
- Leiodes badia (Sturm, 1807)
- Leiodes calcarata Erichson, 1845
- Leiodes cinnamonea (Panzer, 1793)
- Leiodes ferruginea (Fabricius, 1787)
- Leiodes gyllenhalii Stephens, 1829
- Leiodes litura Stephens, 1835
- Leiodes longipes (Schmidt, 1841)
- Leiodes lucens (Fairmaire, 1855)
- Leiodes nigrita (Schmidt, 1841)
- Leiodes obesa (Schmidt, 1841)
- Leiodes triepkei (Schmidt, 1841)

==== Family Staphylinidae (rove beetles) ====
Subfamily Aleocharinae

- Acrotona aterrima (Gravenhorst, 1802)
- Acrotona muscorum (Brisout, 1860)
- Acrotona parvula (Mannerheim, 1830)
- Acrotona pygmaea (Gravenhorst, 1802)
- Alaobia gagatina (Baudi, 1848)
- Alaobia pallidicornis (Thomson, 1856)
- Alaobia sodalis (Erichson, 1837)
- Alaobia trinotata (Kraatz, 1856)
- Aleochara bilineata Gyllenhal, 1810
- Aleochara bipustulata (Linnaeus, 1761)
- Aleochara brevipennis Gravenhorst, 1806
- Aleochara cuniculorum Kraatz, 1858
- Aleochara curtula (Goeze, 1777)
- Aleochara funebris Wollaston, 1864
- Aleochara intricata Mannerheim, 1830
- Aleochara lanuginosa Gravenhorst, 1802
- Aleochara moerens Gyllenhal, 1827
- Aleochara moesta Gravenhorst, 1802
- Aleochara sparsa Heer, 1839
- Aleochara villosa Mannerheim, 1830
- Alevonota rufotestacea (Kraatz, 1856)
- Alianta incana (Erichson, 1837)
- Aloconota cambrica (Wollaston, 1855)
- Aloconota currax (Kraatz, 1856)
- Aloconota gregaria (Erichson, 1839)
- Aloconota insecta (Thomson, 1856)
- Aloconota planifrons (Waterhouse, 1864)
- Aloconota sulcifrons (Stephens, 1832)
- Amidobia talpa (Heer, 1841)
- Amischa analis (Gravenhorst, 1802)
- Amischa bifoveolata (Mannerheim, 1830)
- Amischa decipiens (Sharp, 1869)
- Amischa nigrofusca (Stephens, 1832)
- Anomognathus cuspidatus (Erichson, 1839)
- Anopleta corvina (Thomson, 1856)
- Atheta crassicornis (Fabricius, 1792)
- Atheta paracrassicornis Brundin, 1954
- Atheta basicornis (Mulsant & Rey, 1852)
- Atheta britanniae Bernhauer & Scheerpeltz, 1926
- Atheta brunneipennis (Thomson, 1852)
- Atheta castanoptera (Mannerheim, 1830)
- Atheta cauta (Erichson, 1837)
- Atheta coriaria (Kraatz, 1856)
- Atheta divisa (Märkel, 1844)
- Atheta euryptera (Stephens, 1832)
- Atheta fungicola (Thomson, 1852)
- Atheta graminicola (Gravenhorst, 1806)
- Atheta harwoodi Williams, 1930
- Atheta hypnorum (Kiesenwetter, 1850)
- Atheta incognita (Sharp, 1869)
- Atheta nigricornis (Thomson, 1852)
- Atheta nigritula (Gravenhorst, 1802)
- Atheta pilicornis (Thomson, 1852)
- Atheta ravilla (Erichson, 1839)
- Atheta setigera (Sharp, 1869)
- Atheta strandiella Brundin, 1954
- Atheta triangulum (Kraatz, 1856)
- Atheta xanthopus (Thomson, 1856)
- Atheta aeneicollis (Sharp, 1869)
- Atheta aquatica (Thomson, 1852)
- Atheta aquatilis (Thomson, 1867)
- Autalia impressa (Olivier, 1795)
- Autalia rivularis (Gravenhorst, 1802)
- Badura macrocera (Thomson, 1856)
- Bessobia excellens (Kraatz, 1856)
- Bessobia fungivora (Thomson, 1867)
- Bessobia monticola (Thomson, 1852)
- Bessobia occulta (Erichson, 1837)
- Bolitochara lucida (Gravenhorst, 1802)
- Bolitochara obliqua Erichson, 1837
- Boreophilia eremita (Rye, 1866)
- Brundinia marina (Mulsant & Rey, 1853)
- Brundinia meridionalis (Mulsant & Rey, 1853)
- Cadaverota cadaverina (Brisout, 1860)
- Callicerus obscurus Gravenhorst, 1802
- Callicerus rigidicornis Erichson, 1839
- Calodera aethiops (Gravenhorst, 1802)
- Calodera nigrita Mannerheim, 1830
- Calodera protensa Mannerheim, 1830
- Calodera riparia Erichson, 1837
- Ceritaxa testaceipes (Heer, 1839)
- Chaetida longicornis (Gravenhorst, 1802)
- Chilomorpha longitarsis (Thomson 1867)
- Cordalia obscura (Gravenhorst, 1802)
- Crataraea suturalis (Mannerheim, 1830)
- Cypha hanseni (Palm, 1949)
- Cypha laeviuscula (Mannerheim, 1830)
- Cypha longicornis (Paykull, 1800)
- Cypha ovulum (Heer, 1839)
- Cypha punctum (Motschulsky, 1857)
- Cypha seminulum (Erichson, 1839)
- Cypha tarsalis (Luze, 1902)
- Dacrila fallax (Kraatz, 1856)
- Dadobia immersa (Erichson, 1837)
- Datomicra canescens (Sharp, 1869)
- Datomicra celata (Erichson, 1837)
- Datomicra nigra (Kraatz, 1856)
- Datomicra sordidula (Erichson, 1837)
- Datomicra zosterae (Thomson, 1856)
- Diglotta mersa (Haliday, 1837)
- Diglotta sinuaticollis (Mulsant & Rey, 1871)
- Dilacra luteipes (Erichson, 1837)
- Dilacra vilis (Erichson, 1837)
- Dimetrota aeneipennis (Thompson, 1856)
- Dimetrota atramentaria (Gyllenhal, 1810)
- Dimetrota cinnamoptera (Thomson, 1856)
- Dimetrota intermedia (Thomson, 1852)
- Dimetrota ischnocera Thomson, 1870
- Dimetrota laevana (Mulsant & Rey, 1852)
- Dimetrota marcida (Erichson, 1837)
- Dimetrota nigripes (Thomson, 1856)
- Dinaraea aequata (Erichson, 1837)
- Dinaraea angustula (Gyllenhal, 1810)
- Dinaraea linearis (Gravenhorst, 1802)
- Disopora coulsoni (Last, 1952)
- Disopora longicollis (Mulsant & Rey, 1852)
- Dochmonota clancula (Erichson, 1837)
- Drusilla canaliculata (Fabricius, 1787)
- Emplenota obscurella (Gravenhorst, 1806)
- Enalodroma hepatica (Erichson, 1839)
- Encephalus complicans Kirby, 1832
- Falagria caesa (Erichson, 1837)
- Falagrioma thoracica (Stephens, 1832)
- Geostiba circellaris (Gravenhorst, 1806)
- Gnypeta caerulea (Sahlberg, 1831)
- Gnypeta carbonaria (Mannerheim, 1830)
- Gymnusa brevicollis (Paykull, 1800)
- Gymnusa variegata Kiesenwetter, 1845
- Gyrophaena affinis (Sahlberg, 1830)
- Gyrophaena angustata (Stephens, 1832)
- Gyrophaena bihamata Thomson, 1867
- Gyrophaena fasciata (Marsham, 1802)
- Gyrophaena gentilis Erichson, 1839
- Gyrophaena hanseni Strand, 1946
- Gyrophaena joyi Wendeler, 1924
- Gyrophaena latissima (Stephens, 1832)
- Gyrophaena minima Erichson, 1837
- Gyrophaena nana (Paykull, 1800)
- Gyrophaena poweri Crotch, 1866
- Gyrophaena pulchella Heer, 1839
- Gyrophaena strictula Erichson, 1839
- Halobrecta algae (Hardy, 1851)
- Halobrecta flavipes Thomson, 1861
- Heterota plumbea (Waterhouse, 1858)
- Holobus apicatus (Erichson, 1837)
- Homalota plana (Gyllenhal, 1810)
- Hydrosmecta delicatula (Sharp, 1869)
- Hydrosmecta eximia (Sharp, 1869)
- Hydrosmecta fragilis (Kraatz, 1854)
- Hydrosmecta longula (Heer 1839)
- Hydrosmecta septentrionum (Benick, 1969)
- Hygronoma dimidiata (Gravenhorst, 1806)
- Hygropora cunctans (Erichson, 1837)
- Ilyobates nigricollis (Paykull, 1800)
- Ischnoglossa prolixa (Gravenhorst, 1802)
- Ischnopoda atra (Gravenhorst, 1806)
- Ischnopoda constricta (Erichson, 1837)
- Ischnopoda leucopus (Marsham, 1802)
- Ischnopoda umbratica (Erichson, 1837)
- Leptusa fumida (Erichson, 1839)
- Leptusa norvegica Strand, 1941
- Leptusa pulchella (Mannerheim, 1830)
- Liogluta alpestris (Heer, 1839)
- Liogluta longiuscula (Gravenhorst, 1802)
- Liogluta microptera (Thomson, 1867)
- Liogluta pagana (Erichson, 1839)
- Meotica apicalis Benick, 1953
- Meotica exilis (Knoch, 1806)
- Meotica exillima Sharp, 1915
- Microdota amicula (Stephens, 1832)
- Microdota atricolor (Sharp, 1869)
- Microdota benickiella Brundin, 1948
- Microdota indubia (Sharp, 1869)
- Microdota liliputana (Brisout, 1860)
- Microdota subtilis (Scriba, 1866)
- Mocyta amplicollis (Mulsant & Rey, 1873)
- Mocyta clientula (Erichson, 1839)
- Mocyta fungi (Gravenhorst, 1806)
- Mocyta orbata (Erichson, 1837)
- Mocyta orphana (Erichson, 1837)
- Mycetota laticollis (Stephens, 1832)
- Myllaena brevicornis (Matthews, 1838)
- Myllaena dubia (Gravenhorst, 1806)
- Myllaena gracilicornis Fairmaire & Brisout, 1859
- Myllaena gracilis (Matthews, 1838)
- Myllaena infuscata Kraatz, 1853
- Myllaena intermedia Erichson, 1837
- Myllaena kraatzi Sharp, 1871
- Myllaena minuta (Gravenhorst, 1806)
- Myrmecopora brevipes Butler, 1909
- Myrmecopora sulcata (Kiesenwetter, 1850)
- Myrmecopora uvida (Erichson, 1840)
- Nehemitropia lividipennis Mannerheim, 1830
- Neohilara subterranea (Mulsant & Rey, 1853)
- Notothecta flavipes (Gravenhorst, 1806)
- Ocalea latipennis Sharp, 1870
- Ocalea picata (Stephens, 1832)
- Ocalea rivularis Miller, 1851
- Ocyusa maura (Erichson, 1837)
- Ocyusa picina (Aubé, 1850)
- Oligota granaria Erichson, 1837
- Oligota inflata (Mannerheim, 1830)
- Oligota parva Kraatz, 1862
- Oligota pumilio Kiesenwetter, 1858
- Oligota punctulata Heer, 1839
- Oligota pusillima (Gravenhorst, 1806)
- Oreostiba tibialis (Heer, 1839)
- Oxypoda acuminata (Stephens 1832)
- Oxypoda alternans (Gravenhorst, 1802)
- Oxypoda annularis Mannerheim, 1830
- Oxypoda brachyptera (Stephens, 1832)
- Oxypoda brevicornis (Stephens 1832)
- Oxypoda carbonaria (Heer 1841)
- Oxypoda elongatula Aubé, 1850
- Oxypoda exoleta Erichson, 1839
- Oxypoda flavicornis Kraatz, 1856
- Oxypoda formiceticola Märkel, 1841
- Oxypoda haemorrhoa (Mannerheim, 1830)
- Oxypoda induta Mulsant & Rey, 1861
- Oxypoda lentula Erichson, 1837
- Oxypoda lurida Wollaston, 1857
- Oxypoda opaca (Gravenhorst, 1802)
- Oxypoda procerula Mannerheim, 1830
- Oxypoda tirolensis Gredler, 1863
- Oxypoda umbrata (Gyllenhal, 1810)
- Oxypoda vittata Märkel, 1842
- Pachnida nigella (Erichson, 1837)
- Pachyatheta mortuorum Thomson, 1867
- Parameotica difficilis (Brisout, 1860)
- Parocyusa longitarsis (Erichson, 1839)
- Philhygra arctica (Thomson, 1856)
- Philhygra debilis (Erichson, 1837)
- Philhygra elongatula (Gravenhorst, 1802)
- Philhygra fallaciosa (Sharp, 1869)
- Philhygra gyllenhalii (Thomson, 1856)
- Philhygra hygrobia (Thomson, 1856)
- Philhygra hygrotopora (Kraatz, 1856)
- Philhygra luridipennis (Mannerheim, 1830)
- Philhygra malleus (Joy, 1913)
- Philhygra melanocera (Thomson, 1856)
- Philhygra obtusangula (Joy, 1913)
- Philhygra palustris (Kiesenwetter, 1844)
- Philhygra terminalis (Gravenhorst, 1806)
- Philhygra volans (Scriba, 1859)
- Phloeopora testacea (Mannerheim, 1830)
- Phytosus balticus Kraatz, 1859
- Phytosus nigriventris (Chevrolat, 1843)
- Phytosus spinifer Curtis, 1838
- Plataraea brunnea (Fabricius, 1798)
- Polystomota grisea (Kraatz, 1856)
- Polystomota punctatella (Motschulsky, 1858)
- Schistoglossa aubei (Brisout, 1860)
- Schistoglossa gemina (Erichson, 1837)
- Thamiaraea hospita (Märkel, 1844)
- Thiasophila angulata (Erichson, 1837)
- Thinobaena vestita (Gravenhorst, 1806)
- Tinotus morion (Gravenhorst, 1802)
- Traumoecia picipes (Thomson, 1856)
- Zyras collaris (Paykull, 1800)
- Zyras limbatus (Paykull, 1789)
- Haploglossa nidicola (Fairmaire, 1852)
- Haploglossa villosula (Stephens, 1832)

Subfamily Euaesthetinae

- Euaesthetus bipunctatus (Ljungh, 1804)
- Euaesthetus laeviusculus Mannerheim, 1844
- Euaesthetus ruficapillus Lacordaire, 1835

Subfamily Habrocerinae

- Habrocerus capillaricornis (Gravenhorst, 1806)

Subfamily Micropeplinae

- Micropeplus caelatus Erichson, 1839
- Micropeplus fulvus Erichson, 1840
- Micropeplus porcatus (Paykull, 1789)
- Micropeplus staphylinoides (Marsham, 1802)
- Micropeplus tesserula Curtis, 1828

Subfamily Omaliinae

- Acidota crenata (Fabricius, 1792)
- Acidota cruentata Mannerheim, 1830
- Acrolocha sulcula (Stephens, 1834)
- Acrulia inflata (Gyllenhal, 1813)
- Anthobium atrocephalum (Gyllenhal, 1827)
- Anthobium unicolor (Marsham, 1802)
- Anthophagus alpinus (Paykull, 1790)
- Coryphium angusticolle Stephens, 1834
- Deliphrum tectum (Paykull, 1789)
- Eucnecosum brachypterum (Gravenhorst, 1802)
- Eusphalerum luteum (Marsham, 1802)
- Eusphalerum minutum (Fabricius, 1792)
- Eusphalerum primulae (Stephens, 1834)
- Geodromicus nigrita (Müller, 1821)
- Hapalaraea pygmaea (Paykull, 1800)
- Lesteva hanseni Lohse, 1953
- Lesteva longoelytrata (Goeze, 1777)
- Lesteva monticola Kiesenwetter, 1847
- Lesteva pubescens Mannerheim, 1830
- Lesteva punctata Erichson, 1839
- Lesteva sicula Erichson, 1840
- Lesteva heeri Fauvel, 1872
- Micralymma marina (Ström, 1783)
- Olophrum fuscum (Gravenhorst, 1806)
- Olophrum piceum (Gyllenhal, 1810)
- Omalium allardi Fairmaire & Brisout, 1859
- Omalium caesum Gravenhorst, 1806
- Omalium excavatum Stephens, 1834
- Omalium exiguum Gyllenhal, 1810
- Omalium italicum Bernhauer, 1902
- Omalium laeviusculum Gyllenhal, 1827
- Omalium oxyacanthae Gravenhorst, 1806
- Omalium riparium Thomson, 1857
- Omalium rivulare (Paykull, 1789)
- Omalium rugatum Rey, 1880
- Omalium rugulipenne Rye, 1864
- Omalium septentrionis Thomson, 1857
- Philorinum sordidum (Stephens, 1832)
- Phloeonomus punctipennis Thomson, 1867
- Phloeonomus pusillus (Gravenhorst, 1806)
- Phloeostiba plana (Paykull, 1792)
- Phyllodrepa devillei (Bernhauer, 1902)
- Phyllodrepa gracilicornis (Fairmaire & Laboulbène, 1856)
- Phyllodrepa ioptera (Stephens, 1834)
- Phyllodrepa vilis (Erichson, 1840)
- Phyllodrepa floralis (Paykull, 1789)
- Phyllodrepa puberula Bernhauer, 1903
- Phyllodrepoidea crenata (Gravenhorst, 1802)
- Xylodromus brunnipennis (Stephens, 1832)
- Xylodromus depressus (Gravenhorst, 1802)

Subfamily Oxytelinae

- Anotylus complanatus (Erichson, 1839)
- Anotylus insecatus (Gravenhorst, 1806)
- Anotylus inustus (Gravenhorst, 1806)
- Anotylus maritimus (Thomson, 1861)
- Anotylus nitidulus (Gravenhorst, 1802)
- Anotylus rugosus (Fabricius, 1775)
- Anotylus sculpturatus (Gravenhorst, 1806)
- Anotylus tetracarinatus (Block, 1799)
- Bledius annae Sharp, 1911
- Bledius erraticus Erichson, 1839
- Bledius femoralis Gyllenhal, 1827
- Bledius fergussoni Joy, 1912
- Bledius furcatus (Olivier, 1812)
- Bledius fuscipes Rye, 1865
- Bledius gallicus (Gravenhorst, 1806)
- Bledius limicola Tottenham, 1940
- Bledius longulus Erichson, 1839
- Bledius occidentalis Bondroit, 1907
- Bledius opacus (Block, 1799)
- Bledius praetermissus Williams, 1929
- Bledius subniger Schneider, 1900
- Bledius subterraneus Erichson, 1839
- Bledius unicornis (Germar, 1825)
- Carpelimus bilineatus Stephens, 1834
- Carpelimus corticinus (Gravenhorst, 1806)
- Carpelimus elongatulus (Erichson, 1839)
- Carpelimus fuliginosus (Gravenhorst, 1802)
- Carpelimus gracilis (Mannerheim, 1830)
- Carpelimus impressus (Lacordaire, 1835)
- Carpelimus obesus (Kiesenwetter, 1844)
- Carpelimus pusillus (Gravenhorst, 1802)
- Carpelimus rivularis (Motschulsky, 1860)
- Carpelimus similis Smetana, 1967
- Carpelimus subtilicornis (Roubal, 1946)
- Coprophilus striatulus (Fabricius, 1792)
- Deleaster dichrous (Gravenhorst, 1802)
- Ochthephilus aureus (Fauvel, 1871)
- Ochthephilus omalinus (Erichson, 1840)
- Oxytelus laqueatus (Marsham, 1802)
- Oxytelus sculptus Gravenhorst, 1806
- Platystethus arenarius (Geoffroy, 1785)
- Platystethus cornutus (Gravenhorst, 1802)
- Platystethus nodifrons Mannerheim, 1830
- Syntomium aeneum (Müller, 1821)
- Teropalpus unicolor (Sharp, 1900)
- Thinobius bicolor Joy, 1911
- Thinobius longipennis sensu lato
- Thinodromus arcuatus (Stephens, 1834)

Subfamily Paederinae

- Astenus lyonessius (Joy, 1908)
- Lathrobium angusticolle Lacordaire, 1835
- Lathrobium boreale Hochhuth, 1851
- Lathrobium brunnipes (Fabricius, 1792)
- Lathrobium elongatum (Linnaeus, 1767)
- Lathrobium fovulum Stephens, 1833
- Lathrobium fulvipenne Gravenhorst, 1806
- Lathrobium impressum Heer, 1841
- Lathrobium longulum Gravenhorst, 1802
- Lathrobium multipunctum Gravenhorst, 1802
- Lathrobium pallidipenne Hochhuth 1851
- Lathrobium quadratum (Paykull, 1789)
- Lathrobium rufipenne Gyllenhal, 1813
- Lathrobium terminatum Gravenhorst, 1802
- Lathrobium zetterstedti Rye, 1872
- Lithocharis nigriceps Kraatz, 1859
- Lithocharis ochracea (Gravenhorst, 1802)
- Medon ripicola (Kraatz, 1854)
- Ochthephilum fracticorne (Paykull, 1800)
- Paederus caligatus Erichson, 1840
- Paederus fuscipes Curtis, 1826
- Paederus riparius (Linnaeus, 1758)
- Pseudomedon obsoleta (Nordmann, 1837)
- Rugilus erichsoni (Fauvel, 1867)
- Rugilus geniculatus (Erichson, 1839)
- Rugilus orbiculatus (Paykull, 1789)
- Rugilus rufipes Germar, 1836
- Rugilus similis (Erichson, 1839)
- Scopaeus gracilis (Sperk, 1835)
- Scopaeus sulcicollis (Stephens, 1833)
- Sunius melanocephalus (Fabricius, 1792)
- Sunius propinquus (Brisout, 1847)

Subfamily Phloeocharinae

- Phloeocharis subtilissima Mannerheim, 1830

Subfamily Piestinae

- Siagonium quadricorne Kirby, 1815

Subfamily Proteininae

- Megarthrus bellevoyi (Saulcy 1862)
- Megarthrus denticollis (Beck, 1817)
- Megarthrus depressus (Paykull, 1789)
- Metopsia clypeata (Müller 1821)
- Proteinus atomarius Erichson, 1840
- Proteinus brachypterus (Fabricius, 1792)
- Proteinus laevigatus Hochhuth, 1871
- Proteinus ovalis Stephens, 1834

Subfamily Pseudopsinae

- Pseudopsis sulcata Newman, 1834

Subfamily Staphylininae

- Atrecus affinis (Paykull, 1789)
- Bisnius cephalotes (Gravenhorst, 1802)
- Bisnius fimetarius (Gravenhorst, 1802)
- Bisnius nigriventris Thomson, 1867
- Bisnius puella Nordmann, 1837
- Bisnius sordidus (Gravenhorst, 1802)
- Cafius fucicola Curtis, 1830
- Cafius sericeus (Holme, 1837)
- Cafius xantholoma (Gravenhorst, 1806)
- Creophilus maxillosus (Linnaeus, 1758)
- Dinothenarus pubescens (DeGeer, 1774)
- Erichsonius cinerascens (Gravenhorst, 1802)
- Gabrius bishopi Sharp, 1910
- Gabrius breviventer (Sperk 1835)
- Gabrius keysianus Sharp, 1910
- Gabrius nigritulus (Gravenhorst, 1802)
- Gabrius osseticus (Kolenati, 1846)
- Gabrius piliger Mulsant & Rey, 1876
- Gabrius splendidulus (Gravenhorst, 1802)
- Gabrius subnigritulus (Reitter, 1909)
- Gabrius trossulus (Nordmann, 1837)
- Gabrius velox Sharp, 1910
- Gabronthus thermarum (Aubé, 1850)
- Gauropterus fulgidus (Fabricius, 1787)
- Gyrohypnus angustatus Stephens, 1833
- Gyrohypnus fracticornis (Müller, 1776)
- Gyrohypnus punctulatus (Paykull, 1789)
- Heterothops binotatus (Gravenhorst, 1802)
- Heterothops minutus Wollaston, 1860
- Heterothops niger Kraatz, 1868
- Heterothops praevius Erichson, 1839
- Leptacinus batychrus (Gyllenhal, 1827)
- Leptacinus pusillus (Stephens, 1833)
- Megalinus glabratus (Gravenhorst, 1802)
- Neobisnius lathrobioides (Baudi, 1848)
- Neobisnius procerulus (Gravenhorst, 1806)
- Neobisnius villosulus (Stephens, 1833)
- Ocypus aeneocephalus (DeGeer, 1774)
- Ocypus ater (Gravenhorst, 1802)
- Ocypus brunnipes (Fabricius, 1781)
- Ocypus fortunatarum (Wollaston, 1871)
- Ocypus globulifer Geoffroy, 1785)
- Ocypus melanarius (Heer, 1839)
- Ocypus morsitans (Rossi, 1790)
- Ocypus olens (Müller, 1764)
- Ocypus nitens (Schrank 1781)
- Ontholestes murinus (Linnaeus, 1758)
- Ontholestes tesselatus Stephens, 1829
- Othius angustus Stephens, 1833
- Othius laeviusculus Stephens, 1833
- Othius punctulatus (Goeze, 1777)
- Othius subuliformis Stephens 1833
- Phacophallus parumpunctatus (Gyllenhal, 1827)
- Philonthus addendus Sharp, 1867
- Philonthus albipes (Gravenhorst, 1802)
- Philonthus carbonarius (Gravenhorst, 1802)
- Philonthus cognatus Stephens, 1832
- Philonthus concinnus (Gravenhorst, 1802)
- Philonthus corvinus Erichson, 1839
- Philonthus cruentatus (Gmelin, 1790)
- Philonthus debilis (Gravenhorst, 1802)
- Philonthus decorus (Gravenhorst, 1802)
- Philonthus discoideus (Gravenhorst, 1802)
- Philonthus ebeninus (Gravenhorst, 1802)
- Philonthus fumarius (Gravenhorst, 1806)
- Philonthus furcifer Renkonen, 1937
- Philonthus intermedius (Lacordaire, 1835)
- Philonthus jurgans Tottenham, 1937
- Philonthus laminatus (Creutzer, 1799)
- Philonthus lepidus (Gravenhorst, 1802)
- Philonthus longicornis Stephens, 1832
- Philonthus mannerheimi Fauvel, 1868
- Philonthus marginatus (Ström, 1768)
- Philonthus micans (Gravenhorst, 1802)
- Philonthus micantoides Benick & Lohse, 1956
- Philonthus nigrita (Gravenhorst, 1806)
- Philonthus nitidicollis (Boisduval & Lacordaire, 1835)
- Philonthus parvicornis (Gravenhorst, 1802)
- Philonthus politus (Linnaeus, 1758)
- Philonthus punctus (Gravenhorst, 1802)
- Philonthus quisquiliarius (Gyllenhal, 1810)
- Philonthus rectangulus Sharp, 1874
- Philonthus rotundicollis (Ménétriés, 1832)
- Philonthus sanguinolentus (Gravenhorst, 1802)
- Philonthus splendens (Fabricius, 1792)
- Philonthus succicola Thomson, 1860
- Philonthus tenuicornis Mulsant & Rey, 1853
- Philonthus umbratilis (Gravenhorst, 1802)
- Philonthus varians (Paykull, 1789)
- Philonthus ventralis (Gravenhorst, 1802)
- Quedius assimilis (Nordmann, 1837)
- Quedius auricomus Kiesenwetter, 1850
- Quedius boopoides Munster, 1923
- Quedius boops (Gravenhorst, 1802)
- Quedius brevicornis (Thomson, 1860)
- Quedius brevis Erichson, 1840
- Quedius cinctus (Paykull, 1790)
- Quedius cruentus (Olivier, 1795)
- Quedius curtipennis Bernhauer, 1908
- Quedius fuliginosus (Gravenhorst, 1802)
- Quedius fulvicollis (Stephens, 1833)
- Quedius fumatus (Stephens, 1833)
- Quedius humeralis Stephens, 1832
- Quedius invreae Gridelli, 1924
- Quedius longicornis Kraatz, 1857
- Quedius maurorufus (Gravenhorst, 1806)
- Quedius mesomelinus (Marsham, 1802)
- Quedius molochinus (Gravenhorst, 1806)
- Quedius nigriceps Kraatz, 1857
- Quedius nitipennis (Stephens, 1833)
- Quedius pallipes Lucas, 1849
- Quedius persimilis Mulsant & Rey 1876
- Quedius picipes (Mannerheim, 1830)
- Quedius plagiatus Mannerheim, 1843
- Quedius puncticollis Thomson, 1867
- Quedius schatzmayri Gridelli, 1922
- Quedius scintillans (Gravenhorst, 1806)
- Quedius semiaeneus (Stephens, 1833)
- Quedius semiobscurus (Marsham, 1802)
- Quedius tristis (Gravenhorst, 1802)
- Quedius truncicola Fairmaire & Laboulbène, 1856
- Quedius umbrinus Erichson, 1839
- Staphylinus dimidiaticornis Gemminger, 1851
- Staphylinus erythropterus Linnaeus, 1758
- Xantholinus elegans (Oliver 1795)
- Xantholinus laevigatus Jacobson, 1847
- Xantholinus linearis (Olivier, 1794)
- Xantholinus longiventris Heer, 1839

Subfamily Steninae

- Dianous coerulescens (Gyllenhal, 1810)
- Stenus aceris Stephens, 1833
- Stenus argus Gravenhorst, 1806
- Stenus bifoveolatus Gyllenhal, 1827
- Stenus bimaculatus Gyllenhal, 1810
- Stenus binotatus Ljungh, 1804
- Stenus boops Ljungh, 1810
- Stenus brevipennis Thomson, 1851
- Stenus brunnipes Stephens, 1833
- Stenus canaliculatus Gyllenhal, 1827
- Stenus carbonarius Gyllenhal, 1827
- Stenus cicindeloides (Schaller, 1783)
- Stenus clavicornis (Scopoli, 1763)
- Stenus crassus Stephens, 1833
- Stenus europaeus Puthz, 1966
- Stenus exiguus Erichson, 1840
- Stenus flavipes Stephens, 1833
- Stenus formicetorum Mannerheim, 1843
- Stenus fornicatus Stephens, 1833
- Stenus fulvicornis Stephens, 1833
- Stenus fuscipes Gravenhorst, 1802
- Stenus geniculatus Gravenhorst, 1806
- Stenus glabellus Thomson, 1870
- Stenus glacialis Heer, 1839
- Stenus guttula Müller, 1821
- Stenus guynemeri Jacquelin du Val, 1850
- Stenus impressus Germar, 1824
- Stenus incanus Erichson, 1839
- Stenus incrassatus Erichson, 1839
- Stenus juno (Paykull, 1789)
- Stenus kiesenwetteri Rosenhauer, 1856
- Stenus latifrons Erichson, 1839
- Stenus lustrator Erichson, 1839
- Stenus melanarius Stephens, 1833
- Stenus melanopus (Marsham, 1802)
- Stenus nanus Stephens, 1833
- Stenus nigritulus Gyllenhal, 1827
- Stenus nitens Stephens, 1833
- Stenus nitidiusculus Stephens, 1833
- Stenus opticus Gravenhorst, 1806
- Stenus ossium Stephens, 1833
- Stenus pallitarsis Stephens, 1833
- Stenus palposus Zetterstedt, 1838
- Stenus palustris Erichson, 1839
- Stenus picipennis Erichson, 1840
- Stenus picipes Stephens, 1833
- Stenus providus Erichson, 1839
- Stenus pubescens Stephens, 1833
- Stenus pusillus Stephens, 1833
- Stenus similis (Herbst, 1784)
- Stenus solutus Erichson, 1840
- Stenus tarsalis Ljungh, 1810
- Stenus umbratilis Casey, 1884

Subfamily Tachyporinae

- Bolitobius castaneus (Stephens, 1832)
- Bolitobius cingulatus Mannerheim, 1830
- Bryophacis crassicornis (Mäklin 1847)
- Cilea silphoides (Linnaeus, 1767)
- Ischnosoma longicorne Mäklin, 1847
- Ischnosoma splendidum (Gravenhorst, 1806)
- Lamprinodes saginatus (Gravenhorst, 1806)
- Lordithon exoletus (Erichson, 1839)
- Lordithon lunulatus (Linnaeus, 1761)
- Lordithon thoracicus (Fabricius, 1777)
- Lordithon trinotatus (Erichson, 1839)
- Mycetoporus angularis Mulsant & Rey, 1853
- Mycetoporus clavicornis (Stephens, 1832)
- Mycetoporus despectus Strand, 1969
- Mycetoporus erichsonanus Fagel, 1965
- Mycetoporus lepidus (Gravenhorst, 1806)
- Mycetoporus longulus Mannerheim, 1830
- Mycetoporus nigricollis (Stephens, 1835)
- Mycetoporus punctus (Gravenhorst, 1806)
- Mycetoporus rufescens (Stephens, 1832)
- Parabolitobius inclinans (Gravenhorst, 1806)
- Sepedophilus immaculatus (Stephens, 1832)
- Sepedophilus littoreus (Linnaeus, 1758)
- Sepedophilus marshami (Stephens, 1832)
- Sepedophilus nigripennis (Stephens, 1832)
- Sepedophilus pedicularius (Gravenhorst, 1802)
- Tachinus elongatus Gyllenhal, 1810
- Tachinus humeralis Gravenhorst, 1802
- Tachinus laticollis Gravenhorst, 1802
- Tachinus marginellus (Fabricius, 1781)
- Tachinus pallipes (Gravenhorst, 1806)
- Tachinus proximus Kraatz, 1855
- Tachinus signatus Gravenhorst, 1802
- Tachinus subterraneus (Linnaeus, 1758)
- Tachyporus atriceps Stephens, 1832
- Tachyporus chrysomelinus (Linnaeus, 1758)
- Tachyporus dispar (Paykull, 1789)
- Tachyporus formosus Matthews, 1838
- Tachyporus hypnorum (Fabricius, 1775)
- Tachyporus nitidulus (Fabricius, 1781)
- Tachyporus obtusus (Linnaeus, 1767)
- Tachyporus pallidus Sharp, 1871
- Tachyporus pusillus Gravenhorst, 1806
- Tachyporus solutus Erichson, 1840
- Tachyporus tersus Erichson, 1839
- Tachyporus transversalis Gravenhorst, 1806

Subfamily Pselaphinae

- Bibloplectus ambiguus (Reichenbach, 1816)
- Bibloplectus pusillus (Denny, 1825)
- Bibloplectus spinosus Raffray, 1914
- Bibloporus bicolor (Denny, 1825)
- Brachygluta fossulata (Reichenbach, 1816)
- Brachygluta haematica (Reichenbach, 1816)
- Brachygluta helferi (Schmidt-Göbel, 1836)
- Brachygluta waterhousei (Rye 1869)
- Bryaxis bulbifer (Reichenbach, 1816)
- Bryaxis curtisii (Leach, 1817)
- Bryaxis puncticollis (Denny, 1825)
- Bythinus burrellii Denny, 1825
- Bythinus macropalpus Aubé, 1833
- Claviger testaceus Preyssler, 1790
- Euplectus bescidicus Reitter, 1881
- Euplectus duponti Aubé, 1833
- Euplectus infirmus Raffray, 1910
- Euplectus karstenii (Reichenbach, 1816)
- Euplectus mutator Fauvel 1895
- Euplectus piceus Motschulsky, 1835
- Euplectus punctatus Mulsant, 1861
- Euplectus sanguineus Denny, 1825
- Pselaphaulax dresdensis Herbst, 1792
- Pselaphus heisei Herbst, 1792
- Reichenbachia juncorum (Leach, 1817)
- Rybaxis laminata (Motschulsky, 1836)
- Rybaxis longicornis (Leach, 1817)
- Trissemus impressa (Panzer, 1803)
- Tychus niger (Paykull, 1800)

Subfamily Scydmaeninae

- Cephennium gallicum (Ganglbauer, 1899)
- Euconnus fimetarius (Chaudoir, 1845)
- Euconnus hirticollis (Illiger, 1798)
- Eutheia plicata (Gyllenhal, 1813)
- Neuraphes angulatus (Müller & Künze, 1822)
- Neuraphes elongatulus (Müller & Künze, 1822)
- Neuraphes talparum Lokay, 1920
- Scydmaenus tarsatus Müller & Kunze, 1822
- Scydmoraphes sparshalli (Denny, 1825)
- Stenichnus bicolor (Denny, 1825)
- Stenichnus collaris (Müller & Künze, 1822)
- Stenichnus poweri (Fowler, 1884)
- Stenichnus pusillus (Müller & Künze, 1822)

Subfamily Scaphidiinae

- Scaphisoma agaricinum (Linnaeus, 1758)
- Scaphisoma agaricinum (Linnaeus, 1758)

== See also ==
- List of beetles of Great Britain
- List of subgroups of the order Coleoptera
- Royal Entomological Society Handbooks Out of print parts available as free pdfs are:
- Vol 4 Part 1. Coleoptera, Introduction and keys to families. R. A. Crowson
- Vol 4 Part 2. Coleoptera. Carabidae. Carl H. Lindroth
- Vol 4 Part 3. Coleoptera. Hydradephaga. F. Balfour-Browne
- Vol 4 Part 8a. Coleoptera. Staphylinidae. Section (a) Piestinae to Euaesthetinae. C. E. Tottenham
- Vol 4 Part 9. Coleoptera (Pselaphidae). E. J. Pearce
- Vol 4 Part 10. Coleoptera. Histeroidea. D. G. H. Halstead
- Vol 5 Part 1b. Coleoptera. Buprestidae. Brian Levey
- Vol 5 Part 2c. Coleoptera - Heteroceridae. R. O. S. Clarke
- Vol 5 Part 3. Adults and Larvae of Hide, Larder and Carpet Beetles and their relatives (Coleoptera: Dermestidiae) and of Derodontid Beetles (Coleoptera: Derodontidae). Main text. E. R. Peacock
- Vol 5 Part 3. Adults and Larvae of Hide, Larder and Carpet Beetles and their relatives (Coleoptera: Dermestidiae) and of Derodontid Beetles (Coleoptera: Derodontidae). Figures index. E. R. Peacock
- Vol 5 Part 5a. Coleoptera. Rhizophagidae. Enid R. Peacock
- Vol 5 Part 5b. Coleoptera. Phalacridae. R. T. Thompson
- Vol 5 Part 7. Coleoptera - Coccinellidae & Sphindidae. R. D. Pope
- Vol 5 Part 9. Coleoptera. F. D. Buck
- Vol 5 Part 10. Coleoptera - Tenebrionidae. M. J. D. Brendell
- Vol 5 Part 11 ed1. Coleoptera. Scarabaeoidea (lucanidae, Trogidae, Geotrupidae, Scarabaeidae) E. B. Britton
- Vol 5 Part 11. Dung Beetles & chafers - Coleoptera: Scarabaeoidea. L. Jessop
- Vol 5 Part 12. Coleoptera. Cerambycidae. E. A. J. Duffy
- Vol 5 Part 15. Coleoptera. Scolytidae and Platypodidae. E. A. J. Duffy

Encyclopedia of Life online has many images via search
