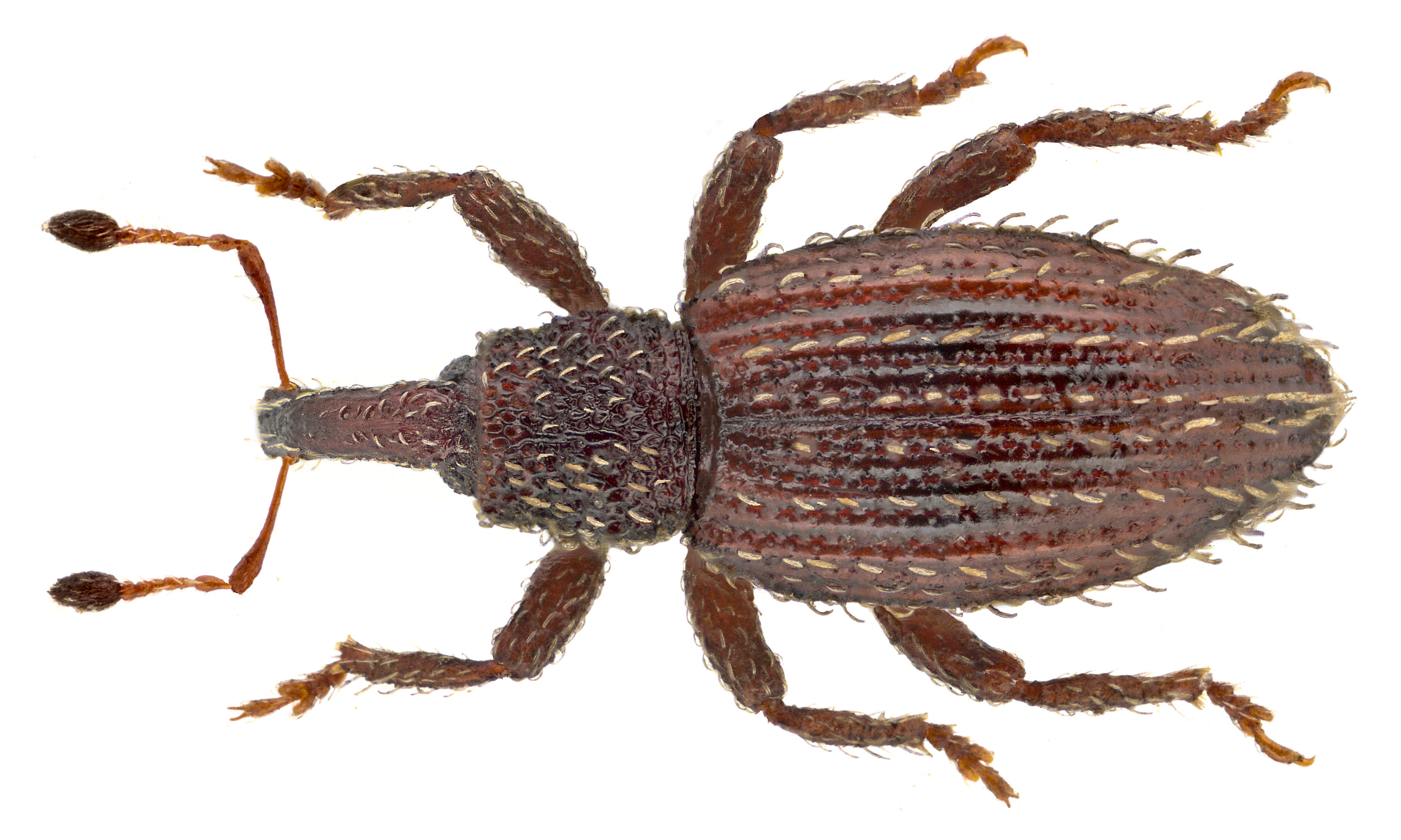
- Orthochaetes setiger 2.5 mm (2.3-3.0 mm)

Scientific classification
- Kingdom: Animalia
- Phylum: Arthropoda
- Clade: Pancrustacea
- Class: Insecta
- Order: Coleoptera
- Suborder: Polyphaga
- Infraorder: Cucujiformia
- Family: Curculionidae
- Genus: Orthochaetes
- Species: O. setiger

Binomial name
- Orthochaetes setiger (Beck, 1817)

= Orthochaetes setiger =

Species of beetle

Orthochaetes setiger is a species of weevil native to Europe.
