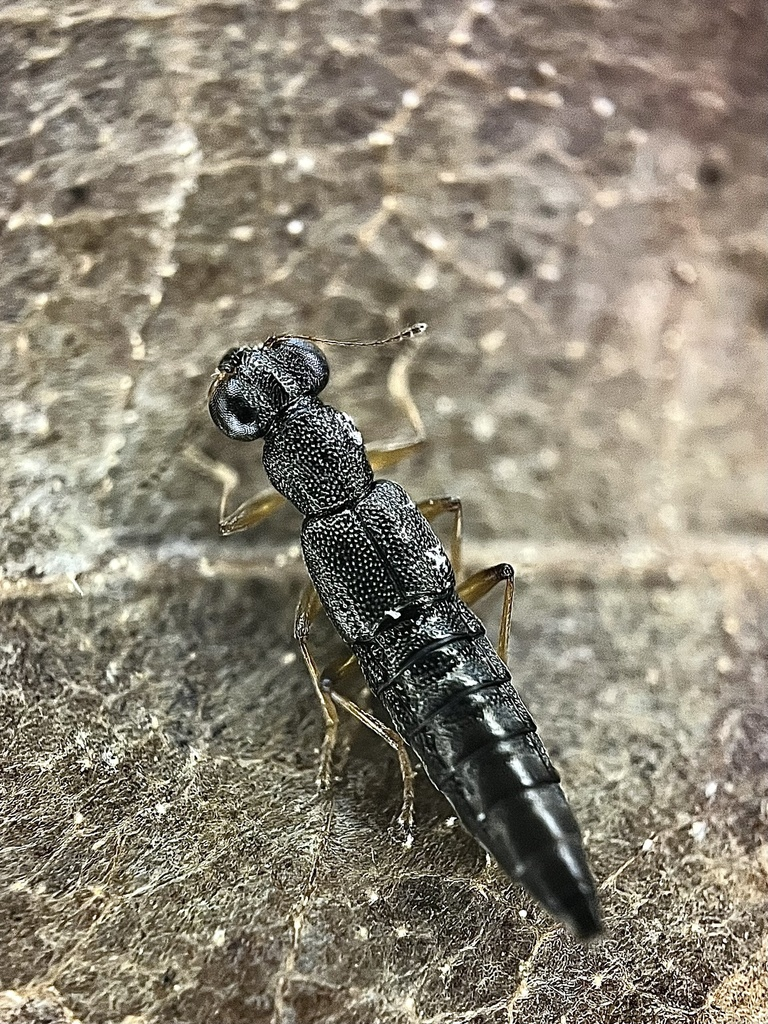
- Stenus impressus found in Washington state

Scientific classification
- Kingdom: Animalia
- Phylum: Arthropoda
- Class: Insecta
- Order: Coleoptera
- Suborder: Polyphaga
- Infraorder: Staphyliniformia
- Family: Staphylinidae
- Genus: Stenus
- Species: S. impressus

Binomial name
- Stenus impressus Germar, 1823

= Stenus impressus =

Species of carnivorous rove beetle

Stenus impressus is a species of carnivorous rove beetle in the genus Stenus found in Europe, as well as British Columbia, and Washington State and Oregon in North America.

Stenus impressus is a recent introduction to the Pacific Northwest and British Columbia. Of the two North American Stenus species found in the Pacific Northwest, this one is the least showy, which is why there is not extreme keying needed to be done for this species as has to be done in Europe.

This species is overall black, and multi segmented, with small indentations down the abdomen. The antenna are feathery.

In Europe there must be dissection or microscopic work done to ID Stenus species, including Stenus impressus.
