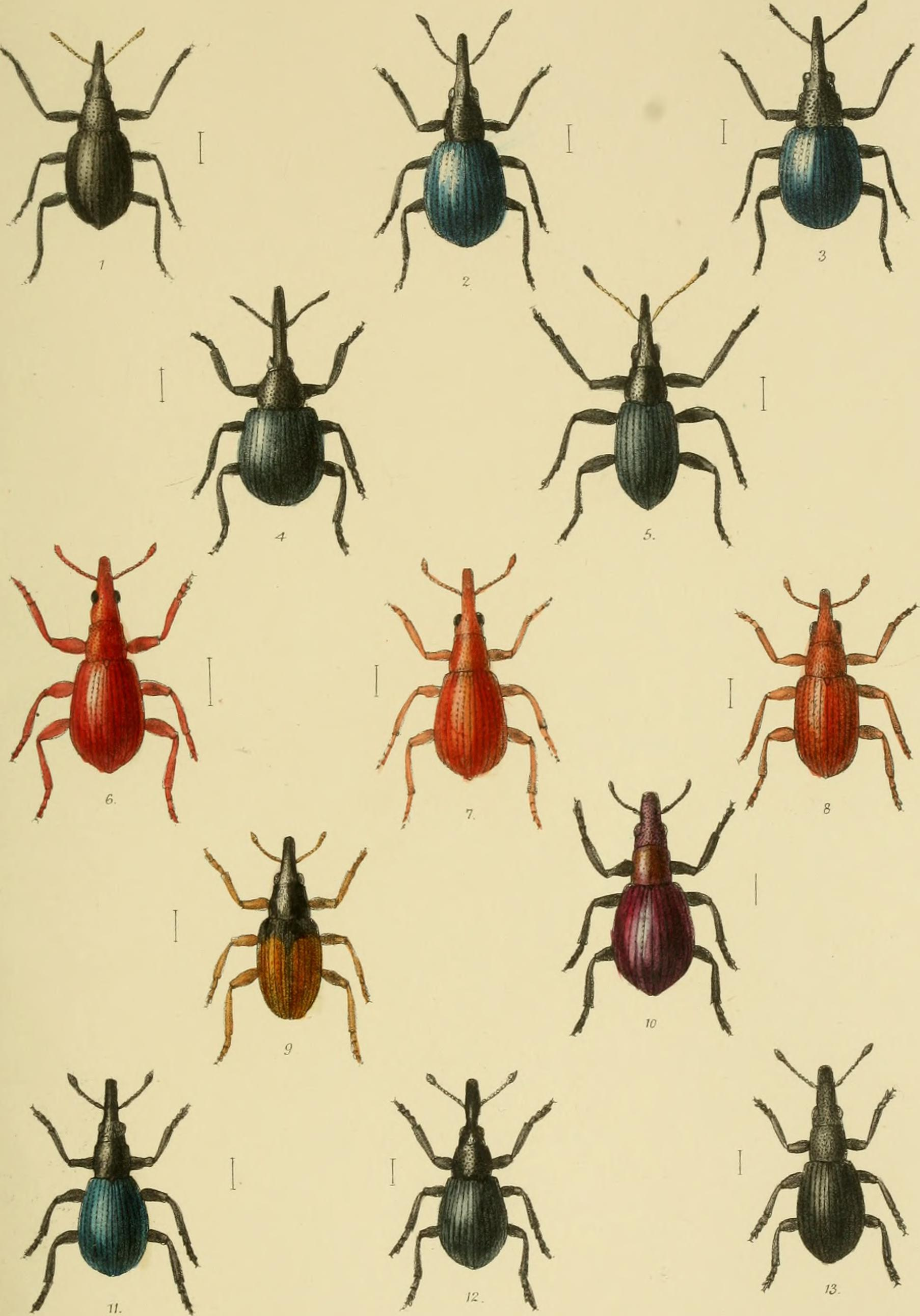

Scientific classification
- Domain: Eukaryota
- Kingdom: Animalia
- Phylum: Arthropoda
- Class: Insecta
- Order: Coleoptera
- Suborder: Polyphaga
- Infraorder: Cucujiformia
- Family: Brentidae
- Genus: Apion
- Species: A. pisi

Binomial name
- Apion pisi (Fabricius, 1801)

= Apion pisi =

Species of beetle

Apion pisi is a species of seed weevils native to Europe. It is phytophagous and a pest of lucerne
