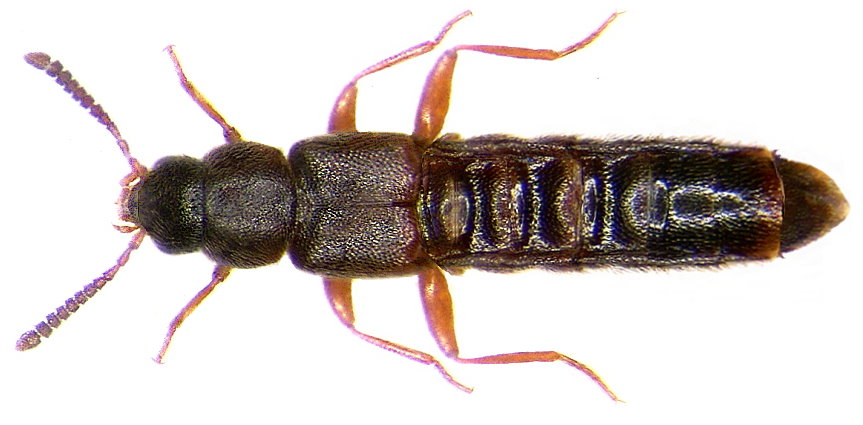

Scientific classification
- Domain: Eukaryota
- Kingdom: Animalia
- Phylum: Arthropoda
- Class: Insecta
- Order: Coleoptera
- Suborder: Polyphaga
- Infraorder: Staphyliniformia
- Family: Staphylinidae
- Genus: Leptusa
- Species: L. pulchella

Binomial name
- Leptusa pulchella Baudi di Selve, 1870

= Leptusa pulchella =

Species of beetle

Leptusa pulchella is a species of beetle belonging to the family Staphylinidae.

Synonym:

- Geostiba pulchella (Baudi di Selve, 1870)
