= Trechus subnotatus =

Scientific classification
- Kingdom: Animalia
- Phylum: Arthropoda
- Class: Insecta
- Order: Coleoptera
- Suborder: Adephaga
- Family: Carabidae
- Genus: Trechus
- Species: T. subnotatus

Binomial name
- Trechus subnotatus Dejean, 1831

Species of beetle

Trechus subnotatus is a species of ground beetle in the Trechinae subfamily.

== Description ==
Beetle in length from 4.5–5 millimetres (0.18–0.20 in).
