= Liogluta longiuscula =

Scientific classification
- Domain: Eukaryota
- Kingdom: Animalia
- Phylum: Arthropoda
- Class: Insecta
- Order: Coleoptera
- Suborder: Polyphaga
- Infraorder: Staphyliniformia
- Family: Staphylinidae
- Genus: Liogluta
- Species: L. longiuscula

Binomial name
- Liogluta longiuscula (Gravenhorst, 1802)

Species of beetle

Liogluta longiuscula is a species of beetle belonging to the family Staphylinidae.

It is native to Europe.
