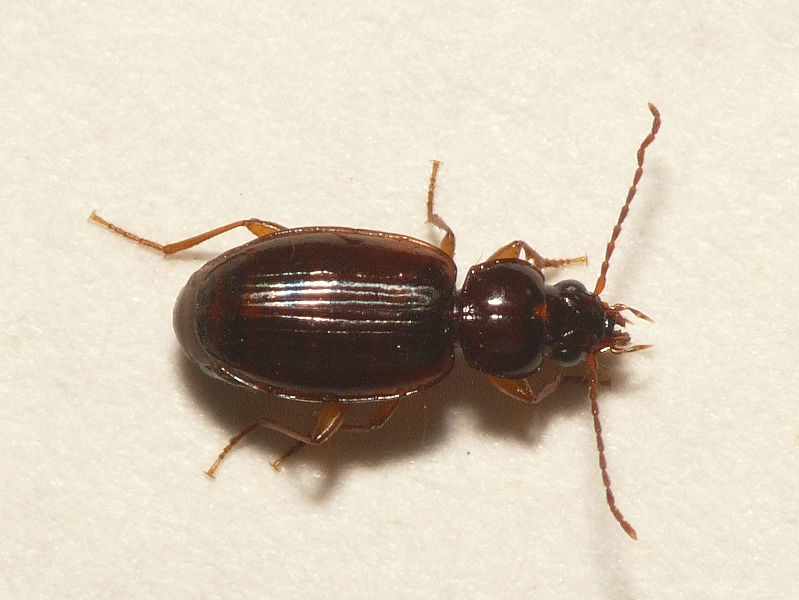

Scientific classification
- Kingdom: Animalia
- Phylum: Arthropoda
- Class: Insecta
- Order: Coleoptera
- Suborder: Adephaga
- Family: Carabidae
- Genus: Trechus
- Species: T. obtusus

Binomial name
- Trechus obtusus Erichson, 1837

= Trechus obtusus =

Species of beetle

Trechus obtusus is a species of ground beetle in the family Carabidae. It is found in North America, Europe, and Africa.

== Subspecies ==
These six subspecies belong to the species Trechus obtusus:

- Trechus obtusus asturicus Jeannel, 1921
- Trechus obtusus battonii Jeanne & Magrini, 2002
- Trechus obtusus lucanus Focarile, 1949
- Trechus obtusus obtusus Erichson, 1837
- Trechus obtusus sejunctus Leleup, 1945
- Trechus obtusus thracicus Pawlowski, 1973
