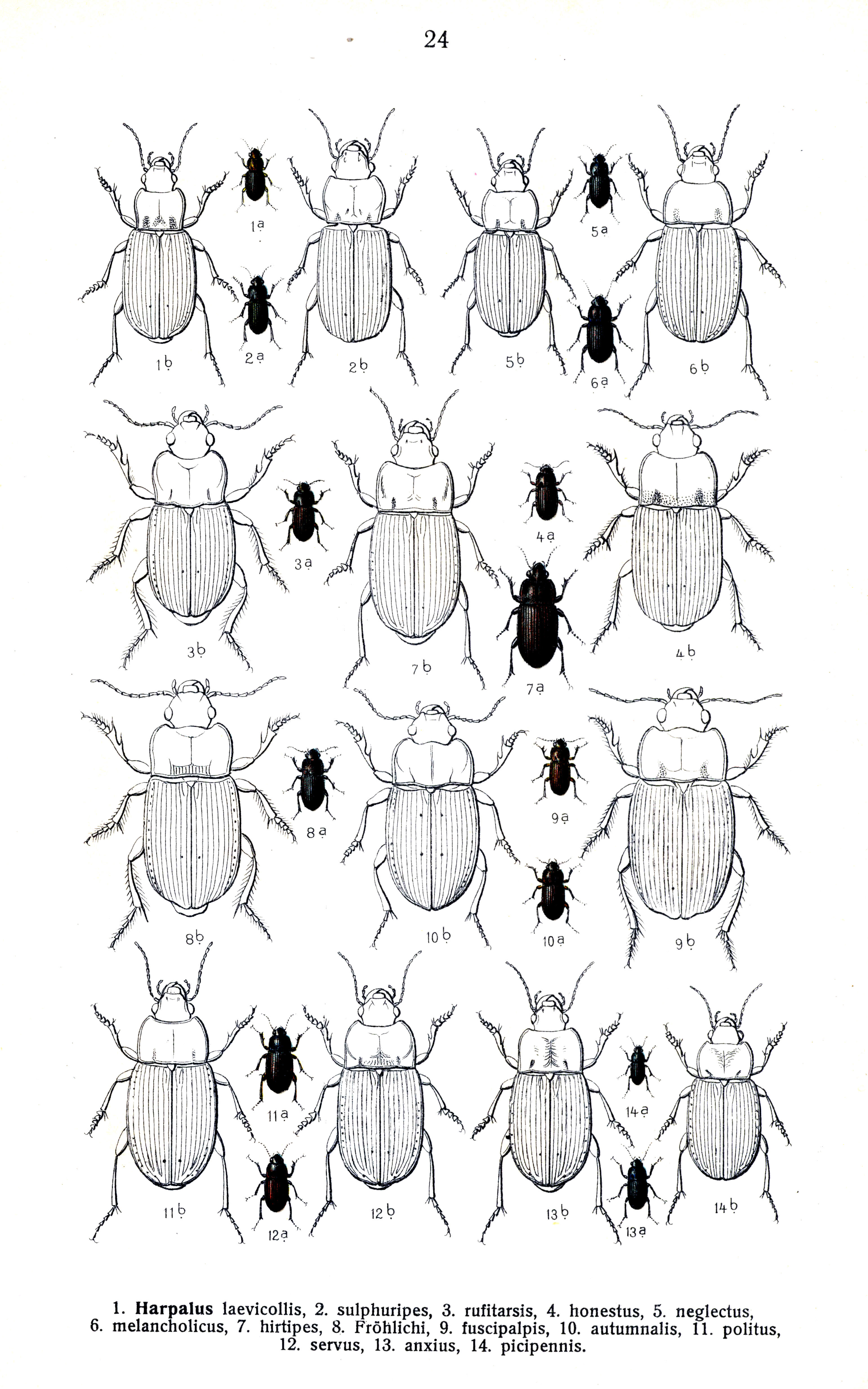

Scientific classification
- Kingdom: Animalia
- Phylum: Arthropoda
- Clade: Pancrustacea
- Class: Insecta
- Order: Coleoptera
- Suborder: Adephaga
- Family: Carabidae
- Genus: Harpalus
- Species: H. rufipalpis

Binomial name
- Harpalus rufipalpis Sturm, 1818

= Harpalus rufipalpis =

Species of beetle

Harpalus rufipalpis is a species of ground beetle in the subfamily Harpalinae. It was described by Sturm in 1818. Harpalus rufipalpis is native to Europe.
