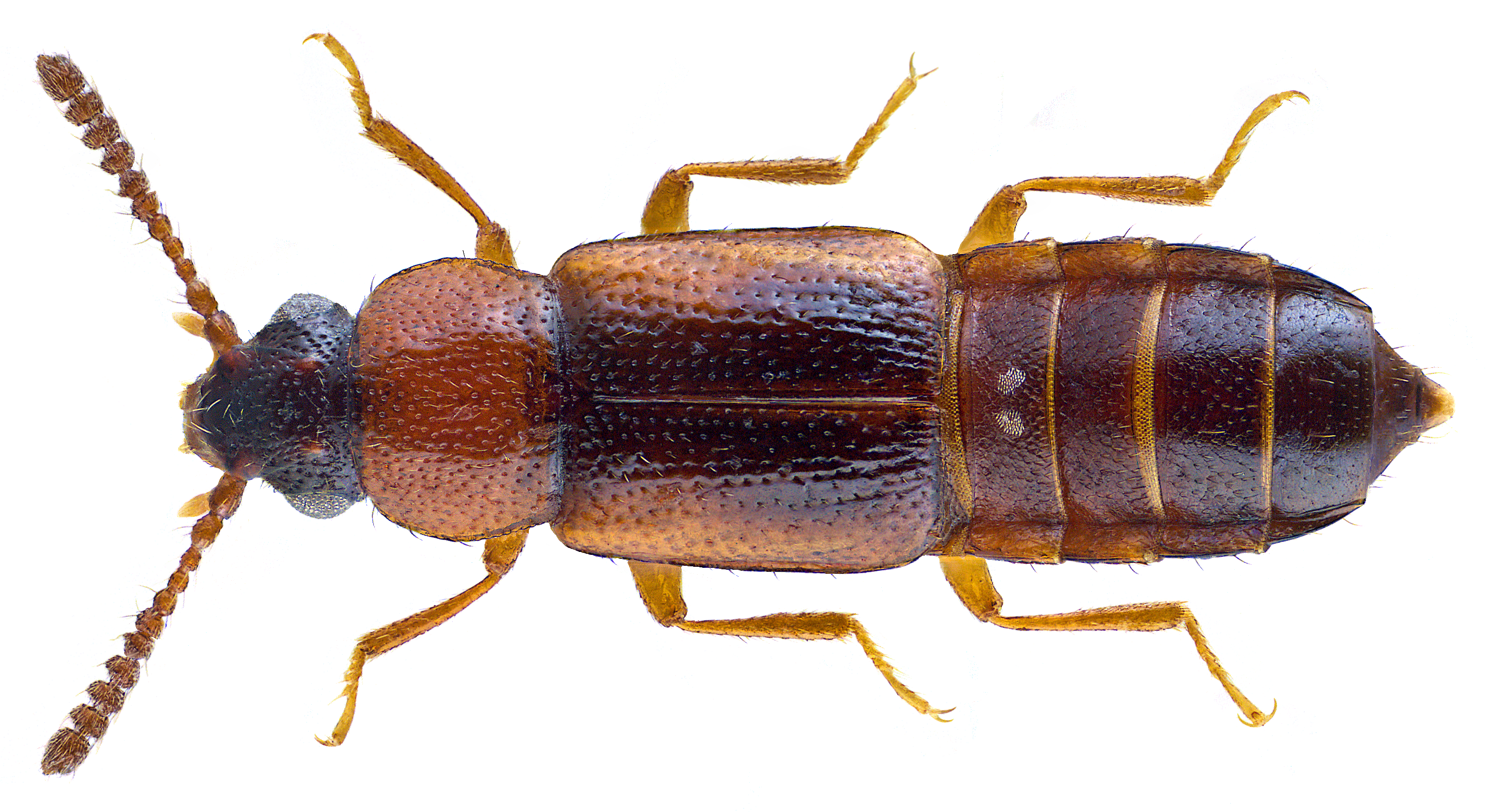
- Phyllodrepa ioptera 2.6 mm (2.5 to 3.0 mm)

Scientific classification
- Kingdom: Animalia
- Phylum: Arthropoda
- Class: Insecta
- Order: Coleoptera
- Suborder: Polyphaga
- Infraorder: Staphyliniformia
- Family: Staphylinidae
- Genus: Phyllodrepa
- Species: P. ioptera

Binomial name
- Phyllodrepa ioptera (Stephens, 1834)

= Phyllodrepa ioptera =

Species of beetle

Phyllodrepa ioptera is a species of rove beetles native to Europe.
