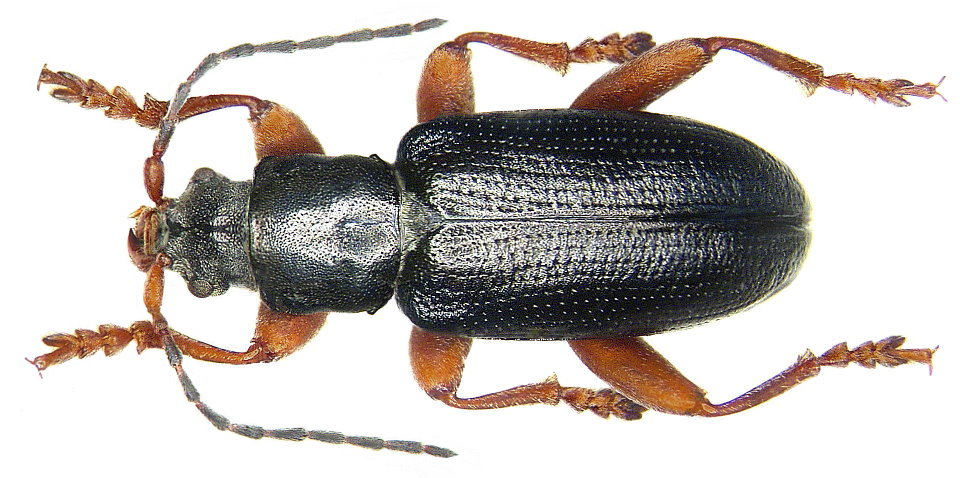

Scientific classification
- Kingdom: Animalia
- Phylum: Arthropoda
- Class: Insecta
- Order: Coleoptera
- Suborder: Polyphaga
- Infraorder: Cucujiformia
- Family: Chrysomelidae
- Genus: Plateumaris
- Species: P. rustica

Binomial name
- Plateumaris rustica (Kunze, 1818)

Synonyms
- Donacia rustica Kunze, 1818

= Plateumaris rustica =

Species of beetle

Plateumaris rustica is a species of leaf beetle native to Europe.
