= List of beetle species of Great Britain =

This is a list of beetle species in Great Britain.

== Suborder Adephaga ==
Family Carabidae
See List of ground beetle (Carabidae) species recorded in Britain

Families Gyrinidae, Haliplidae, Noteridae, Paelobiidae and Dytiscidae
See List of water beetle species recorded in Britain

== Suborder Myxophaga ==
Family Sphaeriusidae

- Sphaerius acaroides

== Suborder Polyphaga ==
=== Infraorder Bostrichiformia ===
==== Superfamily Bostrichoidea ====
Family Dermestidae

- Anthrenocerus australis – Australian carpet beetle
- Anthrenus coloratus
- Anthrenus flavipes – furniture carpet beetle
- Anthrenus fuscus
- Anthrenus museorum – museum beetle
- Anthrenus olgae
- Anthrenus pimpinellae
- Anthrenus sarnicus – Guernsey carpet beetle
- Anthrenus scrophulariae – common carpet beetle
- Anthrenus verbasci – varied carpet beetle
- Attagenus brunneus
- Attagenus cyphonoides
- Attagenus fasciatus – tobacco seed beetle
- Attagenus pellio – fur beetle
- Attagenus smirnovi
- Attagenus trifasciatus
- Attagenus unicolor – black carpet beetle
- Ctesias serra
- Dermestes ater
- Dermestes carnivorus
- Dermestes frischii
- Dermestes haemorrhoidalis – black larder beetle
- Dermestes lardarius – larder beetle
- Dermestes leechi
- Dermestes maculatus – hide beetle
- Dermestes murinus
- Dermestes peruvianus – Peruvian larder beetle
- Dermestes undulatus
- Globicornis nigripes
- Megatoma undata
- Orphinus fulvipes
- Reesa vespulae
- Thorictodes heydeni
- Thylodrias contractus – odd beetle, tissue paper beetle
- Trinodes hirtus
- Trogoderma angustum
- Trogoderma glabrum
- Trogoderma granarium – Khapra beetle, cabinet beetle
- Trogoderma inclusum – large cabinet beetle
- Trogoderma variabile

Family Bostrichidae

- Bostrichus capucinus
- Bostrychoplites cornutus
- Lyctus brunneus
- Lyctus cavicollis
- Lyctus linearis – European lyctus beetle
- Lyctus planicollis – southern lyctus beetle
- Lyctus sinensis
- Rhyzopertha dominica – lesser grain borer
- Stephanopachys substriatus
- Trogoxylon parallelopipedum

Family Ptinidae

- Anitys rubens
- Anobium inexspectatum
- Anobium punctatum – common furniture beetle
- Caenocara affinis
- Caenocara bovistae
- Dorcatoma ambjoerni
- Dorcatoma chrysomelina
- Dorcatoma dresdensis
- Dorcatoma flavicornis
- Dorcatoma serra
- Dryophilus anobioides
- Dryophilus pusillus
- Ernobius abietis
- Ernobius angusticollis
- Ernobius gigas
- Ernobius mollis
- Ernobius nigrinus
- Ernobius pini
- Gastrallus immarginatus
- Gibbium aequinoctiale
- Gibbium psylloides
- Grynobius planus
- Hadrobregmus denticollis
- Hemicoelus fulvicornis
- Hemicoelus nitidus
- Lasioderma serricorne – cigarette beetle
- Mezium affine
- Niptus hololeucus – golden spider beetle
- Ochina ptinoides – ivy boring beetle
- Pseudeurostus hilleri
- Ptilinus pectinicornis – fan-bearing wood-borer
- Ptinomorphus imperialis
- Ptinus clavipes
- Ptinus dubius
- Ptinus exulans
- Ptinus fur – white-marked spider beetle
- Ptinus lichenum
- Ptinus palliatus
- Ptinus pilosus
- Ptinus pusillus
- Ptinus raptor
- Ptinus sexpunctatus
- Ptinus subpilosus
- Ptinus tectus – Australian spider beetle
- Ptinus villiger
- Sphaericus gibboides
- Stegobium paniceum – drugstore beetle, biscuit beetle
- Stethomezium squamosum
- Tipnus unicolor
- Trigonogenius globulum – globular spider beetle
- Tropicoptinus latefasciatus (formerly Ptinus latefasciatus))
- Xestobium rufovillosum – deathwatch beetle
- Xyletinus longitarsis

==== Superfamily Derodontoidea ====
Family Derodontidae

- Larcobius erichsonii

=== Infraorder Cucujiformia ===
==== Superfamily Chrysomeloidea ====
Family Cerambycidae
See List of longhorn beetle (Cerambycidae) species recorded in Britain

Family Orsodacnidae

- Orsodacne cerasi
- Orsodacne humeralis

Family Megalopodidae

- Zeugophora flavicollis
- Zeugophora subspinosa
- Zeugophora turneri

Family Chrysomelidae
See List of leaf beetle (Chrysomelidae) species recorded in Britain

==== Superfamily Cleroidea ====
Family Phloiophilidae

- Phloiophilus edwardsii

Family Trogossitidae

- Lophocateres pusillus
- Nemozoma elongatum
- Ostoma ferrugineum
- Tenebroides mauritanicus – cadelle beetle
- Thymalus limbatus

Family Cleridae

- Korynetes caeruleus – steely blue beetle
- Necrobia ruficollis
- Necrobia rufipes – red-legged ham beetle
- Necrobia violacea
- Opilo mollis
- Paratillus carus
- Tarsostenus univittatus
- Thanasimus femoralis
- Thanasimus formicarius – ant beetle, European red-bellied clerid
- Thaneroclerus buquet
- Tilloidea unifasciata
- Tillus elongatus
- Trichodes alvearius
- Trichodes apiarius

Family Melyridae

- Anthocomus fasciatus
- Anthocomus rufus
- Aplocnemus impressus
- Aplocnemus nigricornis
- Axinotarsus marginalis
- Axinotarsus pulicarius
- Axinotarsus ruficollis
- Cerapheles terminatus
- Clanoptilus barnevillei
- Clanoptilus marginellus
- Clanoptilus strangulatus
- Cordylepherus viridis
- Dasytes aeratus
- Dasytes cyaneus
- Dasytes niger
- Dasytes plumbeus
- Dasytes virens
- Dolichosoma lineare
- Ebaeus pedicularius
- Hypebaeus flavipes
- Malachius aeneus
- Malachius bipustulatus – malachite beetle
- Psilothrix viridicoeruleus
- Sphinginus lobatus
- Troglops cephalotes

==== Superfamily Cucujoidea ====
Family Sphindidae

- Aspidiphorus orbiculatus
- Sphindus dubius

Family Kateretidae

- Brachypterolus antirrhini
- Brachypterolus linariae
- Brachypterolus pulicarius
- Brachypterolus vestitus
- Brachypterus glaber
- Brachypterus urticae
- Kateretes pedicularius
- Kateretes pusillus
- Kateretes rufilabris

Family Nitidulidae (pollen beetles)
See List of pollen beetles (Nitidulidae) recorded in Britain

Family Monotomidae

- Cyanostolus aeneus
- Monotoma angusticollis
- Monotoma bicolor
- Monotoma brevicollis
- Monotoma conicicollis
- Monotoma longicollis
- Monotoma picipes
- Monotoma quadricollis
- Monotoma quadrifoveolata
- Monotoma spinicollis
- Monotoma testacea
- Rhizophagus bipustulatus
- Rhizophagus cribratus
- Rhizophagus depressus
- Rhizophagus dispar
- Rhizophagus ferrugineus
- Rhizophagus grandis
- Rhizophagus nitidulus
- Rhizophagus oblongicollis
- Rhizophagus parallelocollis
- Rhizophagus parvulus
- Rhizophagus perforatus
- Rhizophagus picipes

Family Silvanidae

- Ahasverus advena – foreign grain beetle
- Cathartus quadricollis – square-necked grain beetle
- Cryptamorpha desjardinsii – Desjardins' beetle
- Dendophagus crenatus
- Nausibius clavicornis
- Oryzaephilus mercator – merchant grain beetle
- Oryzaephilus surinamensis – saw-toothed grain beetle
- Psammoecus bipunctatus
- Silvanus bidentatus
- Silvanoprus fagi
- Silvanus unidentatus
- Uleiota planata

Family Cucujidae

- Pediacus depressus
- Pediacus dermestoides

Family Laemophloeidae

- Cryptolestes capensis
- Cryptolestes duplicatus
- Cryptolestes ferrugineus
- Cryptolestes pusilloides
- Cryptolestes pusillus
- Cryptolestes spartii
- Cryptolestes turcicus
- Laemophloeus monilis
- Leptophoeus clematidis
- Leptophoeus janeti
- Notolaemus unifasciatus

Family Phalacridae

- Olibrus aeneus
- Olibrus affinis
- Olibrus corticalis
- Olibrus flavicornis
- Olibrus liquidus
- Olibrus millefolii
- Olibrus pygmaeus
- Phalacrus brunnipes
- Phalacrus caricis
- Phalacrus corruscus
- Phalacrus fimetarius
- Phalacrus substriatus
- Stilbus atomarius
- Stilbus oblongus
- Stilbus testaceus

Family Cryptophagidae

- Antherophagus canescens
- Antherophagus nigricornis
- Antherophagus pallens
- Atomaria apicalis
- Atomaria atra
- Atomaria atricapilla
- Atomaria badia
- Atomaria barani
- Atomaria basalis
- Atomaria bella
- Atomaria clavigera
- Atomaria diluta
- Atomaria fimetarii
- Atomaria fuscata
- Atomaria fuscipes
- Atomaria gutta
- Atomaria hislopi
- Atomaria impressa
- Atomaria lewisi
- Atomaria linearis – pygmy mangel beetle
- Atomaria lohsei
- Atomaria mesomela
- Atomaria morio
- Atomaria munda
- Atomaria nigripennis
- Atomaria nigrirostris
- Atomaria nigriventris
- Atomaria nitidula
- Atomaria ornata
- Atomaria peltata
- Atomaria procerula
- Atomaria pseudatra
- Atomaria pulchra
- Atomaria puncticollis
- Atomaria punctithorax
- Atomaria pusilla
- Atomaria rhenana
- Atomaria rubella
- Atomaria rubida
- Atomaria rubricollis
- Atomaria scutellaris
- Atomaria strandi
- Atomaria testacea
- Atomaria turgida
- Atomaria umbrina
- Atomaria wollastoni
- Atomaria zetterstedti
- Caenoscelis ferruginea
- Caenoscelis sibirica
- Caenoscelis subdeplanata
- Cryptophagus acuminatus
- Cryptophagus acutangulus
- Cryptophagus angustus
- Cryptophagus badius
- Cryptophagus cellaris
- Cryptophagus confusus
- Cryptophagus corticinus
- Cryptophagus dentatus
- Cryptophagus distinguendus
- Cryptophagus falcozi
- Cryptophagus fallax
- Cryptophagus fuscicornis
- Cryptophagus hexagonalis
- Cryptophagus immixtus
- Cryptophagus intermedius
- Cryptophagus labilis
- Cryptophagus lapponicus
- Cryptophagus laticollis
- Cryptophagus lycoperdi
- Cryptophagus micaceus
- Cryptophagus obsoletus
- Cryptophagus pallidus
- Cryptophagus pilosus
- Cryptophagus populi
- Cryptophagus pseudodentatus
- Cryptophagus pubescens
- Cryptophagus rotundatus
- Cryptophagus ruficornis
- Cryptophagus saginatus
- Cryptophagus scanicus
- Cryptophagus schmidtii
- Cryptophagus scutellatus
- Cryptophagus setulosus
- Cryptophagus simplex
- Cryptophagus subdepressus
- Cryptophagus subfumatus
- Cryptophagus subvittatus
- Ephistemus globulus
- Henoticus californicus
- Henoticus serratus
- Hypocoprus latridioides
- Micrambe abietis
- Micrambe aubrooki
- Micrambe bimaculata
- Micrambe lindbergorum
- Micrambe villosa
- Micrambe vini
- Ootypus globosus
- Paramecosoma melanocephalum
- Telmatophilus brevicollis
- Telmatophilus caricis
- Telmatophilus schoenherrii
- Telmatophilus sparganii
- Telmatophilus typhae

Family Erotylidae

- Dacne bipustulata
- Dacne rufifrons
- Triplax aenea
- Triplax lacordairii
- Triplax russica
- Triplax scutellaris
- Tritoma bipustulata

Family Byturidae

- Byturus ochraceus
- Byturus tomentosus – raspberry beetle

Family Biphyllidae

- Biphyllus lunatus
- Diplocoelus fagi

Family Bothrideridae

- Anommatus diecki
- Anommatus duodecimstriatus
- Oxylaemus cylindricus
- Oxylaemus variolosus
- Teredus cylindricus

Family Cerylonidae

- Cerylon fagi
- Cerylon ferrugineum
- Cerylon histeroides
- Murmidius ovalis
- Murmidius segregatus

Family Alexiidae

- Sphaerosoma pilosum

Family Endomychidae

- Endomychus coccineus
- Holoparamecus caularum
- Holoparamecus depressus
- Holoparamecus singularis
- Lycoperdina bovistae
- Lycoperdina succincta
- Mycetaea subterranea
- Symbiotes latus

Family Coccinellidae (ladybirds)
See List of ladybirds and related beetle species recorded in Britain

Family Corylophidae

- Corylophus cassidoides
- Corylophus sublaevipennis
- Orthoperus aequalis
- Orthoperus atomarius
- Orthoperus atomus
- Orthoperus brunnipes
- Orthoperus corticalis
- Orthoperus nigrescens
- Rypobius praetermissus
- Sericoderus lateralis

Family Latridiidae

- Adistemia watsoni
- Cartodere bifasciata
- Cartodere constricta
- Cartodere nodifer
- Cartodere norvegica
- Corticaria abietorum
- Corticaria alleni
- Corticaria crenulata
- Corticaria dubia
- Corticaria elongata
- Corticaria fagi
- Corticaria ferruginea
- Corticaria fulva
- Corticaria impressa
- Corticaria inconspicua
- Corticaria longicollis
- Corticaria polypori
- Corticaria punctulata
- Corticaria rubripes
- Corticaria serrata
- Corticaria umbilicata
- Corticarina fulvipes
- Corticarina fuscula
- Corticarina lambiana
- Corticarina latipennis
- Corticarina similata
- Corticarina truncatella
- Cortinicara gibbosa
- Dienerella argus
- Dienerella clathrata
- Dienerella elegans
- Dienerella elongata
- Dienerella filiformis
- Dienerella filum
- Dienerella ruficollis
- Dienerella schueppeli
- Enicmus brevicornis
- Enicmus fungicola
- Enicmus histrio
- Enicmus rugosus
- Enicmus testaceus
- Enicmus transversus
- Latridius anthracinus
- Latridius consimilis
- Latridius minutus
- Latridius pseudominutus
- Lithostygnus serripennis
- Melanophthalma curticollis
- Melanophthalma distinguenda
- Melanophthalma suturalis
- Stephostethus alternans
- Stephostethus angusticollis
- Stephostethus lardarius
- Thes bergrothi

==== Superfamily Curculionoidea ====
See List of weevil (Curculionoidea) species recorded in Britain

==== Superfamily Lymexyloidea ====
Family Lymexylidae

- Hylecoetus dermestoides
- Lymexylon navale

==== Superfamily Tenebrionoidea ====
See List of beetle species recorded in Britain - superfamily Tenebrionoidea

=== Infraorder Elateriformia ===
==== Superfamily Buprestoidea ====
Family Buprestidae

- Agrilus angustulus
- Agrilus biguttatus
- Agrilus laticornis
- Agrilus sinuatus
- Agrilus sulcicollis
- Agrilus viridis – beech splendour beetle
- Anthaxia nitidula
- Anthaxia quadripunctata
- Anthaxia salicis
- Aphanisticus emarginatus
- Aphanisticus pusillus
- Bupretis aurulenta – golden buprestid
- Melanophila acuminata
- Trachys minutus
- Trachys scrobiculatus
- Trachys troglodytes

==== Superfamily Byrrhoidea ====
Family Byrrhidae

- Byrrhus arietinus
- Byrrhus fasciatus
- Byrrhus pilula
- Byrrhus pustulatus
- Chaetophora spinosa
- Curimopsis maritima
- Curimopsis nigrita – mire pill beetle
- Curimopsis setigera
- Cytilus sericeus
- Morychus aeneus
- Porcinolus murinus
- Simplocaria maculosa
- Simplocaria semistriata

Families Elmidae, Dryopidae and Limnichidae
See List of water beetle species recorded in Britain

Family Heteroceridae

- Augyles hispidulus
- Augyles maritimus
- Heterocerus femoralis
- Heterocerus fenestratus
- Heterocerus flexuosus
- Heterocerus fossor
- Heterocerus fusculus
- Heterocerus marginatus
- Heterocerus obsoletus

Family Psephenidae

- Eubria palustris

==== Superfamily Dascilloidea ====
Family Dascillidae

- Dascillus cervinus

==== Superfamily Elateroidea ====
Family Eucnemidae

- Epiphanis cornutus
- Eucnemis capucina
- Hylis cariniceps
- Hylis olexai
- Melasis buprestoides
- Microrhagus pygmaeus

Family Throscidae

- Aulonothrosucus brevicollis
- Trixagus carinifrons
- Trixagus dermestoides
- Trixagus gracilis
- Trixagus obtusus

Family Elateridae (click beetles)
See List of click beetle (Elateridae) species recorded in Britain

Family Drilidae

- Drilus flavescens

Family Lycidae

- Dictyoptera aurora
- Platycis cosnardi
- Platycis minutus
- Pyropterus nigroruber

Family Lampyridae

- Lamprohiza splendidula
- Lampyris noctiluca – common glow-worm
- Phosphaenus hemipterus – lesser glow-worm

Family Cantharidae
See List of soldier beetle (Cantharidae) species recorded in Britain

==== Superfamily Scirtoidea ====
Family Eucinetidae

- Eucinetus meridionalis

Family Clambidae

- Calyptomerus dubius
- Clambus armadillo
- Clambus evae
- Clambus gibbulus
- Clambus nigrellus
- Clambus nigriclavis
- Clambus pallidulus
- Clambus pubescens
- Clambus punctulus
- Clambus simsoni

Family Scirtidae

- Cyphon coarctatus
- Cyphon hilaris
- Cyphon kongsbergensis
- Cyphon laevipennis
- Cyphon ochraceus
- Cyphon padi
- Cyphon palustris
- Cyphon pubescens
- Cyphon punctipennis
- Cyphon variabilis
- Elodes elongata
- Elodes minuta
- Elodes pseudominuta
- Elodes tricuspis
- Hydrocyphon deflexicollis
- Microcara testacea
- Odeles marginata
- Prionocyphon serricornis
- Scirtes hemisphaericus
- Scirtes orbicularis

=== Infraorder Scarabaeiformia ===
==== Superfamily Scarabaeoidea ====
See List of dung beetle and chafer (Scarabaeoidea) species recorded in Britain

=== Infraorder Staphyliniformia ===
==== Superfamily Histeroidea ====
Family Sphaeritidae

- Sphaerites glabratus

Family Histeridae

- Abraeus granulum
- Abraeus perpusillus
- Acritus homoeopathicus
- Acritus nigricornis
- Aeletes atomarius
- Atholus bimaculatus
- Atholus duodecimstriatus
- Carcinops pumilio
- Dendrophilus punctatus
- Dendrophilus pygmaeus
- Dendrophilus xavieri
- Epierus comptus
- Gnathoncus buyssoni
- Gnathoncus communis
- Gnathoncus nannetensis
- Gnathoncus rotundatus
- Haeterius ferrugineus
- Halacritus punctum
- Hister bissexstriatus
- Hister illigeri
- Hister quadrimaculatus
- Hister quadrinotatus
- Hister unicolor
- Hypocaccus dimidiatus
- Hypocaccus metallicus
- Hypocaccus rugiceps
- Hypocaccus rugifrons
- Kissister minimus
- Margarinotus brunneus
- Margarinotus marginatus
- Margarinotus merdarius
- Margarinotus neglectus
- Margarinotus obscurus
- Margarinotus purpurascens
- Margarinotus striola
- Margarinotus ventralis
- Myrmetes paykulli
- Onthophilus punctatus
- Onthophilus striatus
- Paromalus flavicornis
- Paromalus parallelepipedus
- Plegaderus dissectus
- Plegaderus vulneratus
- Saprinus aeneus
- Saprinus immundus
- Saprinus planiusculus
- Saprinus semistriatus
- Saprinus subnitescens
- Saprinus virescens
- Teretrius fabricii

==== Superfamily Hydrophiloidea ====
See List of water beetle species recorded in Britain

==== Superfamily Staphylinoidea ====
Family Hydraenidae
See List of water beetle species recorded in Britain

Family Ptiliidae

- Acrotrichis arnoldi
- Acrotrichis atomaria
- Acrotrichis brevipennis
- Acrotrichis cephalotes
- Acrotrichis cognata
- Acrotrichis danica
- Acrotrichis dispar
- Acrotrichis fascicularis
- Acrotrichis grandicollis
- Acrotrichis insularis
- Acrotrichis intermedia
- Acrotrichis josephi
- Acrotrichis lucidula
- Acrotrichis montandonii
- Acrotrichis norvegica
- Acrotrichis parva
- Acrotrichis pumila
- Acrotrichis rosskotheni
- Acrotrichis rugulosa
- Acrotrichis sanctaehelenae
- Acrotrichis sericans
- Acrotrichis silvatica
- Acrotrichis sitkaensis
- Acrotrichis strandi
- Acrotrichis thoracica
- Actidium aterrimum
- Actidium coarctatum
- Actinopteryx fucicola
- Baeocrara variolosa
- Euryptilium gillmeisteri
- Euryptilium saxonicum
- Micridium halidaii
- Microptilium palustre
- Microptilium pulchellum
- Millidium minutissimum
- Nephanes titan
- Nossidium pilosellum
- Oligella foveolata
- Oligella insignis
- Oligella intermedia
- Ptenidium brenskei
- Ptenidium formicetorum
- Ptenidium fuscicorne
- Ptenidium gressneri
- Ptenidium intermedium
- Ptenidium laevigatum
- Ptenidium longicorne
- Ptenidium nitidum
- Ptenidium punctatum
- Ptenidium pusillum
- Ptenidium turgidum
- Pteryx suturalis
- Ptiliola brevicollis
- Ptiliola kunzei
- Ptiliolum caledonicum
- Ptiliolum fuscum
- Ptiliolum marginatum
- Ptiliolum sahlbergi
- Ptiliolum schwarzi
- Ptiliolum spencei
- Ptilium affine
- Ptilium caesum
- Ptilium exaratum
- Ptilium horioni
- Ptilium myrmecophilum
- Ptinella aptera
- Ptinella britannica
- Ptinella cavelli
- Ptinella denticollis
- Ptinella errabunda
- Ptinella limbata
- Ptinella simsoni
- Ptinella taylorae
- Smicrus filicornis

Family Leiodidae

- Agaricophagus cephalotes
- Agathidium arcticum
- Agathidium atrum
- Agathidium confusum
- Agathidium convexum
- Agathidium laevigatum
- Agathidium marginatum
- Agathidium nigrinum
- Agathidium nigripenne
- Agathidium pisanum
- Agathidium rotundatum
- Agathidium seminulum
- Agathidium varians
- Aglyptinus agathidioides
- Amphicyllis globus
- Anisotoma castanea
- Anisotoma glabra
- Anisotoma humeralis
- Anisotoma orbicularis
- Catopidius depressus
- Catops chrysomeloides
- Catops coracinus
- Catops fuliginosus
- Catops fuscus
- Catops grandicollis
- Catops kirbii
- Catops longulus
- Catops morio
- Catops nigricans
- Catops nigriclavis
- Catops nigrita
- Catops tristis
- Choleva agilis
- Choleva angustata
- Choleva cisteloides
- Choleva elongata
- Choleva fagniezi
- Choleva glauca
- Choleva jeanneli
- Choleva lederiana
- Choleva oblonga
- Choleva spadicea
- Colenis immunda
- Colon angulare
- Colon appendiculatum
- Colon brunneum
- Colon dentipes
- Colon latum
- Colon rufescens
- Colon serripes
- Colon viennense
- Colon zebei
- Hydnobius latifrons
- Hydnobius punctatus
- Hydnobius spinipes
- Leiodes badia
- Leiodes calcarata
- Leiodes ciliaris
- Leiodes cinnamomea
- Leiodes ferruginea
- Leiodes flavescens
- Leiodes furva
- Leiodes gallica
- Leiodes gyllenhalii
- Leiodes litura
- Leiodes longipes
- Leiodes lucens
- Leiodes lunicollis
- Leiodes macropus
- Leiodes nigrita
- Leiodes obesa
- Leiodes oblonga
- Leiodes picea
- Leiodes rufipennis
- Leiodes rugosa
- Leiodes silesiaca
- Leiodes strigipennis
- Leiodes triepkii
- Leptinus testaceus
- Liocyrtusa minuta
- Liocyrtusa vittata
- Nargus anisotomoides
- Nargus velox
- Nargus wilkinii
- Nemadus colonoides
- Parabathyscia wollastoni
- Ptomaphagus medius
- Ptomaphagus subvillosus
- Ptomaphagus varicornis
- Sciodrepoides fumatus
- Sciodrepoides watsoni
- Sogda suturalis
- Triarthron maerkelii

Family Scydmaenidae

- Cephennium gallicum
- Euconnus denticornis
- Euconnus duboisi
- Euconnus fimetarius
- Euconnus hirticollis
- Euconnus maeklinii
- Euconnus pragensis
- Euconnus rutilipennis
- Eutheia formicetorum
- Eutheia linearis
- Eutheia plicata
- Eutheia schaumii
- Eutheia scydmaenoides
- Euthiconus conicicollis
- Microscydmus minimus
- Microscydmus nanus
- Neuraphes angulatus
- Neuraphes carinatus
- Neuraphes elongatulus
- Neuraphes plicicollis
- Neuraphes praeteritus
- Neuraphes talparum
- Scydmaenus rufus
- Scydmaenus tarsatus
- Scydmoraphes helvolus
- Scydmoraphes sparshalli
- Stenichnus bicolor
- Stenichnus collaris
- Stenichnus godarti
- Stenichnus poweri
- Stenichnus pusillus
- Stenichnus scutellaris

Family Silphidae

- Aclypea opaca
- Aclypea undata
- Dendroxena quadrimaculata
- Necrodes littoralis
- Nicrophorus germanicus
- Nicrophorus humator
- Nicrophorus interruptus
- Nicrophorus investigator
- Nicrophorus vespillo
- Nicrophorus vespilloides
- Nicrophorus vestigator
- Oiceoptoma thoracicum
- Silpha atrata
- Silpha carinata
- Silpha laevigata
- Silpha obscura
- Silpha tristis
- Silpha tyrolensis
- Thanatophilus dispar
- Thanatophilus rugosus
- Thanatophilus sinuatus

Family Staphylinidae
See List of rove beetle (Staphylinidae) species recorded in Britain

== See also ==
- List of beetles of Ireland
