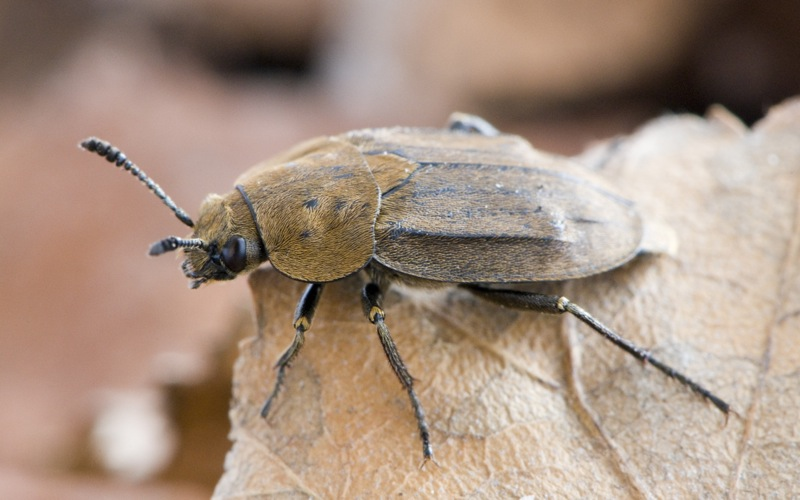
- Aclypea opaca

Scientific classification
- Kingdom: Animalia
- Phylum: Arthropoda
- Clade: Pancrustacea
- Class: Insecta
- Order: Coleoptera
- Suborder: Polyphaga
- Infraorder: Staphyliniformia
- Family: Staphylinidae
- Tribe: Silphini
- Genus: Aclypea; Reitter, 1885

= Aclypea =

Genus of beetles

Aclypea is a genus of carrion beetles in the family Silphidae. There are 11 described species in Aclypea.

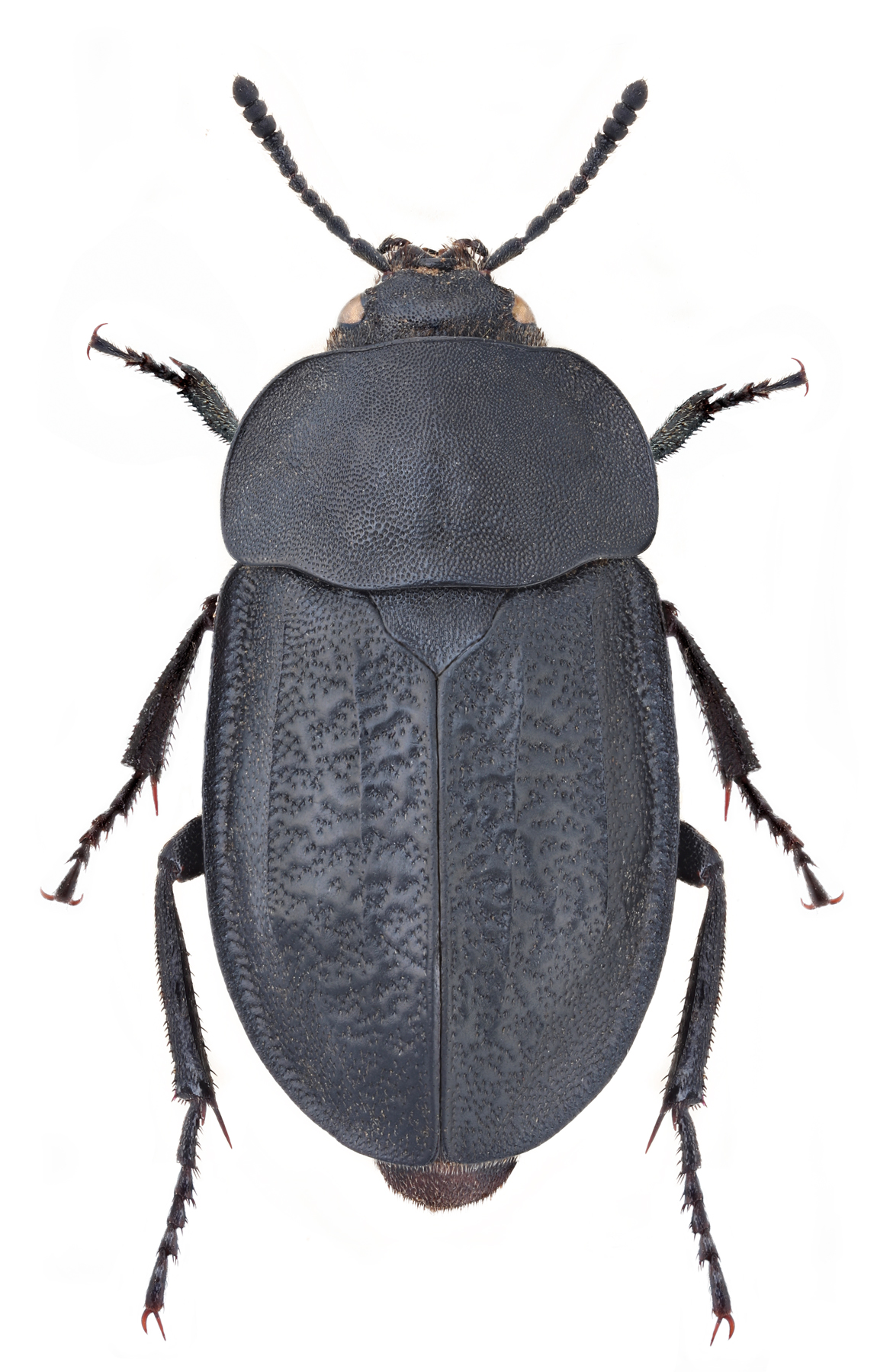
Aclypea undata

== Species ==
- Aclypea bicarinata (Gebler, 1830)
- Aclypea bituberosa (LeConte, 1859) (western spinach carrion beetle)
- Aclypea calva (Reitter, 1890)
- Aclypea cicatricosa Reitter, 1884
- Aclypea daurica (Gebler, 1832)
- Aclypea opaca (Linnaeus, 1758)
- Aclypea pamirensis Jakowlew, 1887
- Aclypea sericea (Zoubkoff, 1833)
- Aclypea souverbii (Fairmaire, 1848)
- Aclypea turkestanica (Ballion, 1870)
- Aclypea undata (Müller, 1776)
