= Atholus minutus =

Scientific classification
- Kingdom: Animalia
- Phylum: Arthropoda
- Class: Insecta
- Order: Coleoptera
- Suborder: Polyphaga
- Infraorder: Staphyliniformia
- Family: Histeridae
- Genus: Atholus
- Species: A. minutus

Binomial name
- Atholus minutus Ross, 1940

Species of beetle

Atholus minutus is a species of clown beetle in the family Histeridae. It is found in North America.
