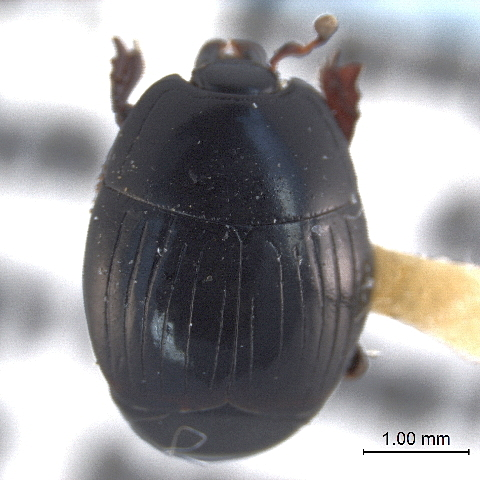
- Atholus americanus

Scientific classification
- Kingdom: Animalia
- Phylum: Arthropoda
- Class: Insecta
- Order: Coleoptera
- Suborder: Polyphaga
- Infraorder: Staphyliniformia
- Family: Histeridae
- Genus: Atholus
- Species: A. americanus

Binomial name
- Atholus americanus (Paykull, 1811)

= Atholus americanus =

Species of beetle

Atholus americanus is a species of clown beetle in the family Histeridae. It is found in North America, ranging from the eastern foothills of the Rocky Mountains to central Quebec, with its southern extents poorly known. It ranges in size from 2.7 to 4.2mm. This species is distinct from other members of Atholus because of its united 5th dorsal and sutural striations and the lack of any subhumeral striations.
