= Atholus relictus =

Scientific classification
- Kingdom: Animalia
- Phylum: Arthropoda
- Class: Insecta
- Order: Coleoptera
- Suborder: Polyphaga
- Infraorder: Staphyliniformia
- Family: Histeridae
- Genus: Atholus
- Species: A. relictus

Binomial name
- Atholus relictus (Marseul, 1870)

Species of beetle

Atholus relictus is a species of clown beetle in the family Histeridae. It is found in North America.
