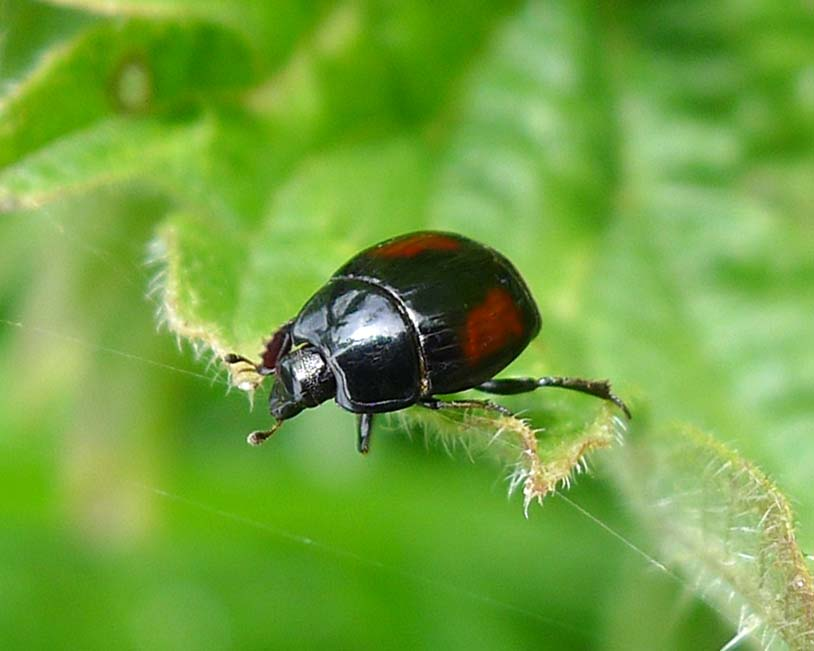
- Atholus bimaculatus

Scientific classification
- Kingdom: Animalia
- Phylum: Arthropoda
- Class: Insecta
- Order: Coleoptera
- Suborder: Polyphaga
- Infraorder: Staphyliniformia
- Family: Histeridae
- Tribe: Histerini
- Genus: Atholus; C. Thomson, 1859

= Atholus =

Genus of beetles

Atholus is a genus of clown beetles in the family Histeridae. There are more than 70 described species in Atholus.

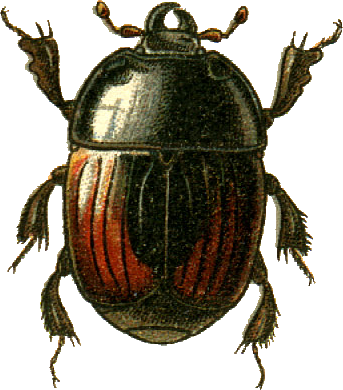
Atholus scutellaris

== Species ==
These 78 species belong to the genus Atholus:

- Atholus aequistrius (Marseul, 1854)
- Atholus americanus (Paykull, 1811)
- Atholus amplificipes Mazur, 2013
- Atholus arcatus (Lewis, 1908)
- Atholus arrowi (Desbordes, 1923)
- Atholus astragali Olexa, 1987
- Atholus atricolor Lewis, 1907
- Atholus baberii (Lewis, 1901)
- Atholus bakeri (Bickhardt, 1914)
- Atholus bifrons (Marseul, 1854)
- Atholus bimaculatus (Linnaeus, 1758)
- Atholus bolteri Wenzel, 1944
- Atholus brancuccii Mazur, 2013
- Atholus cinctipygus (Lewis, 1900)
- Atholus cochinchinae (Schmidt, 1889)
- Atholus coelestis (Marseul, 1857)
- Atholus concordans (Marseul, 1870)
- Atholus confinis (Erichson, 1834)
- Atholus conformis (Erichson, 1834)
- Atholus corvinus (Germar, 1817)
- Atholus crenatifrons (Lewis, 1899)
- Atholus cycloides (Burgeon, 1939)
- Atholus daldorffi (Bedel, 1906)
- Atholus debeauxi (Moro, 1942)
- Atholus dentipes (Lewis, 1892)
- Atholus depistor (Marseul, 1873)
- Atholus duodecimstriatus (Schrank, 1781)
- Atholus erichsoni Lundgren in Johnson et al., 1991
- Atholus euphorbiae (Peyerimhoff, 1925)
- Atholus falli (Bickhardt, 1912)
- Atholus famulus (Lewis, 1892)
- Atholus gestroi (Schmidt, 1897)
- Atholus goudotii (Marseul, 1854)
- Atholus graueri (G. Müller, 1944)
- Atholus helferi (Reichardt, 1932)
- Atholus holzschuhi Olexa, 1988
- Atholus hucheti Gomy, 2004
- Atholus infirmus (Schmidt, 1889)
- Atholus khnzoriani Olexa, 1982
- Atholus kuijteni Kanaar, 1983
- Atholus laequatus (Lewis, 1905)
- Atholus lao Mazur, 2013
- Atholus levis Mazur, 2013
- Atholus maindronii (Lewis, 1901)
- Atholus malaysi Lewis, 1908
- Atholus minutus Ross, 1940
- Atholus myrmidon (Marseul, 1861)
- Atholus nitidissimus Desbordes, 1925
- Atholus nubilus (J. L. LeConte, 1859)
- Atholus omar (Lewis, 1913)
- Atholus paganettii (Bickhardt, 1911)
- Atholus peloponnesus Kapler, 1992
- Atholus perplexus (J. L. LeConte, 1863)
- Atholus philippinensis (Marseul, 1854)
- Atholus pinnulae (Lewis, 1900)
- Atholus pirithous (Marseul, 1873)
- Atholus praetermissus (Peyron, 1856)
- Atholus relictus (Marseul, 1870)
- Atholus rubricatus (Lewis, 1897)
- Atholus rudesculptus (Reichardt, 1922)
- Atholus scutellaris (Erichson, 1834)
- Atholus sedecimstriatus (Say, 1825)
- Atholus sessilis (Lewis, 1899)
- Atholus siculus (Tournier, 1869)
- Atholus silvicola (Lewis, 1901)
- Atholus singalanus (Marseul, 1880)
- Atholus somali (Lewis, 1885)
- Atholus staudingeri (Schmidt, 1889)
- Atholus striatipennis (Lewis, 1892)
- Atholus striatithorax Desbordes, 1930
- Atholus tenuistriatus (Lewis, 1889)
- Atholus terraemotus (Lewis, 1900)
- Atholus tetricus (Lewis, 1902)
- Atholus tornatus (J. L. LeConte, 1880)
- Atholus torquatus (Marseul, 1854)
- Atholus vacillans (Lewis, 1900)
- Atholus viennai Secq, 2000
- Atholus yelamosi Gomy, 2011
