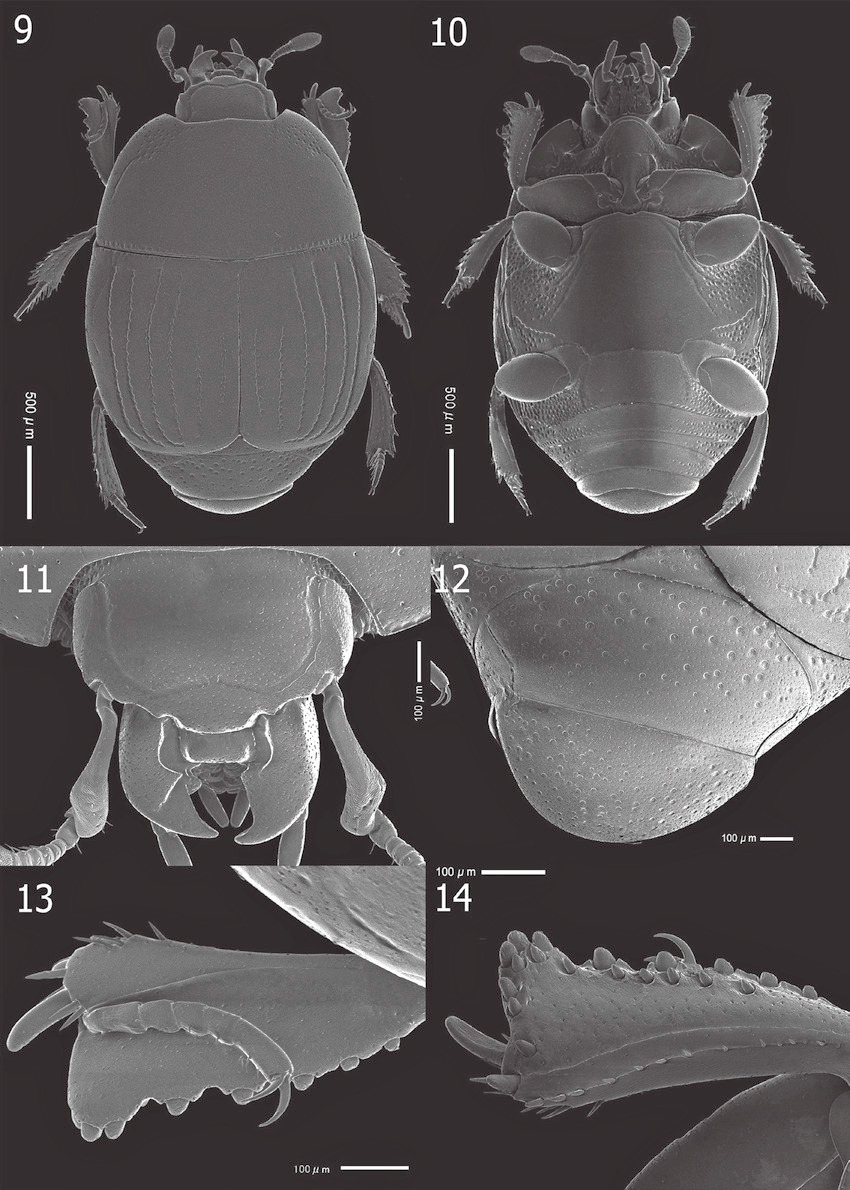

Scientific classification
- Kingdom: Animalia
- Phylum: Arthropoda
- Class: Insecta
- Order: Coleoptera
- Suborder: Polyphaga
- Infraorder: Staphyliniformia
- Family: Histeridae
- Genus: Atholus
- Species: A. coelestis

Binomial name
- Atholus coelestis (Marseul, 1857)

Synonyms
- Hister coelestis Marseul, 1857; Hister (Atholus) coelestis Desbordes, 1921; Atholus coelestis Hisamatsu & Kusui, 1984; Atholus (Euatholus) coelestls Hisamatsu & Kusui, 1984; Atholus (Euatholus) coelestes [sic] Hisamatsu, 1985; Hister femoralis Motschulsky, 1863

= Atholus coelestis =

Species of beetle

Atholus coelestis, is a species of clown beetle found in Indo-Pacific regional countries such as Tajikistan, India, Sri Lanka, Nepal, China, Japan, Taiwan, Indochina, Java, Philippines, Indonesia, Celebes and Comores.

== Description ==
Male is about 2.57 to 3.81 mm, whereas female is 3.09 to 3.57 mm in length.
