= Sciodrepoides terminans =

Scientific classification
- Domain: Eukaryota
- Kingdom: Animalia
- Phylum: Arthropoda
- Class: Insecta
- Order: Coleoptera
- Suborder: Polyphaga
- Infraorder: Staphyliniformia
- Family: Leiodidae
- Genus: Sciodrepoides
- Species: S. terminans

Binomial name
- Sciodrepoides terminans (LeConte, 1850)

Species of beetle

Sciodrepoides terminans is a species of small carrion beetle in the family Leiodidae. It is found in North America.
