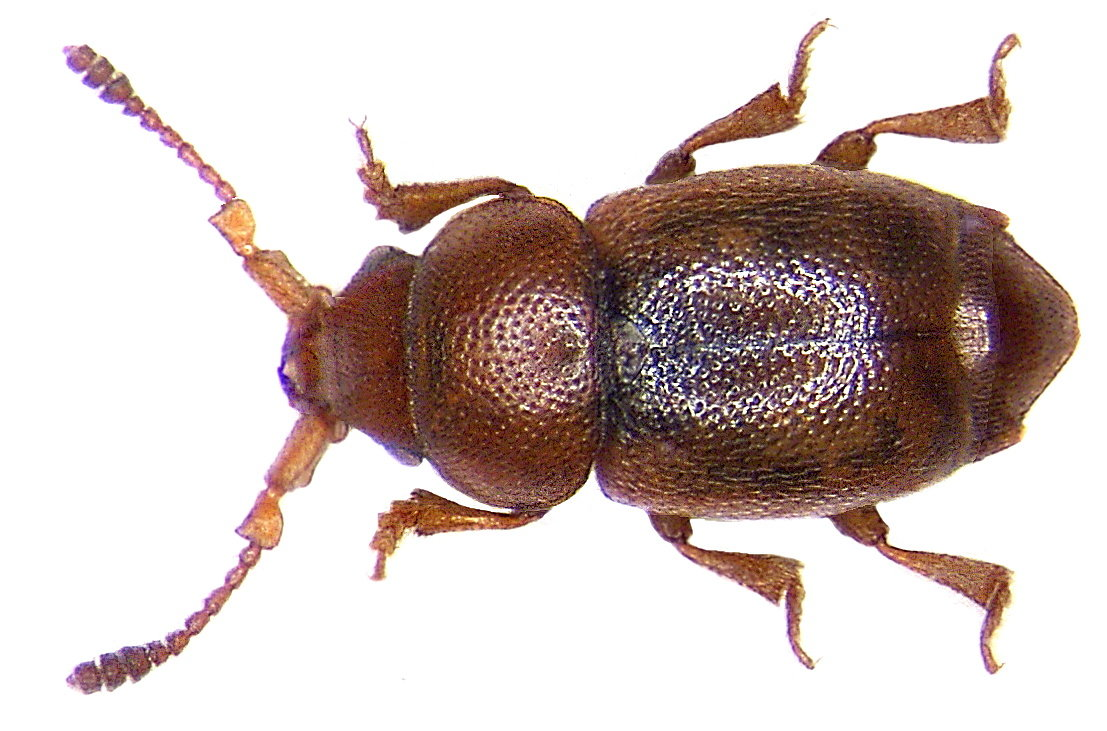
- Kateretes pedicularius 1,6-3 mm

Scientific classification
- Kingdom: Animalia
- Phylum: Arthropoda
- Class: Insecta
- Order: Coleoptera
- Suborder: Polyphaga
- Infraorder: Cucujiformia
- Family: Kateretidae
- Genus: Kateretes
- Species: K. pedicularius

Binomial name
- Kateretes pedicularius (Linnaeus, 1758)

= Kateretes pedicularius =

Species of beetle

Kateretes pedicularius is a species of short-winged flower beetles native to Europe.
