= Atholus nubilus =

Scientific classification
- Kingdom: Animalia
- Phylum: Arthropoda
- Clade: Pancrustacea
- Class: Insecta
- Order: Coleoptera
- Suborder: Polyphaga
- Infraorder: Staphyliniformia
- Family: Histeridae
- Genus: Atholus
- Species: A. nubilus

Binomial name
- Atholus nubilus (J. L. LeConte, 1859)

Species of beetle

Atholus nubilus is a species of clown beetle in the family Histeridae. It is found in Central America and North America.
