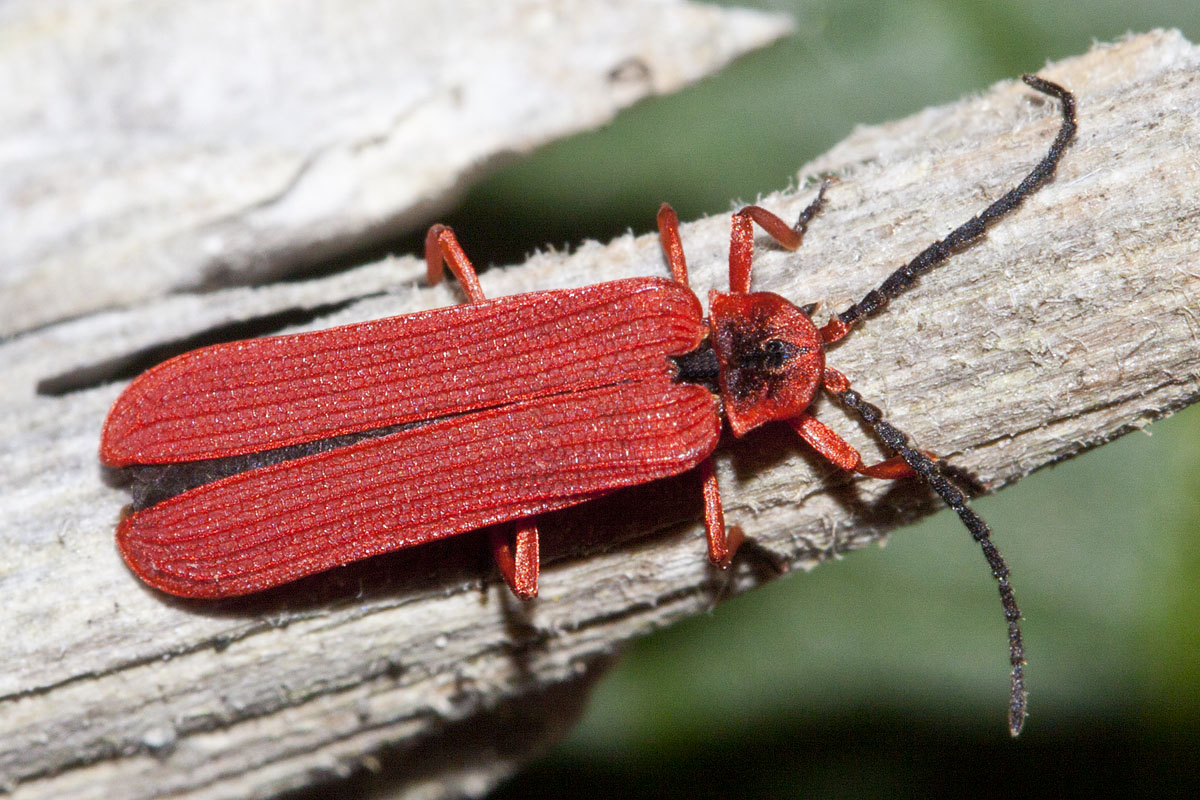

Scientific classification
- Domain: Eukaryota
- Kingdom: Animalia
- Phylum: Arthropoda
- Class: Insecta
- Order: Coleoptera
- Suborder: Polyphaga
- Infraorder: Elateriformia
- Family: Lycidae
- Genus: Dictyoptera
- Species: D. simplicipes

Binomial name
- Dictyoptera simplicipes Mannerheim, 1843

= Dictyoptera simplicipes =

Species of beetle

Dictyoptera simplicipes is a species of net-winged beetle in the family Lycidae. It is found in North America.
