= Agaricophagus =

Scientific classification
- Domain: Eukaryota
- Kingdom: Animalia
- Phylum: Arthropoda
- Class: Insecta
- Order: Coleoptera
- Suborder: Polyphaga
- Infraorder: Staphyliniformia
- Family: Leiodidae
- Subfamily: Leiodinae
- Tribe: Pseudoliodini
- Genus: Agaricophagus; Schmidt, 1841

Genus of beetles

Agaricophagus is a genus of beetle belonging to the family Leiodidae.

The genus was first described by Schmidt in 1841.

The species of this genus are found in Europe.

Species:

- Agaricophagus cephalotes Schmidt, 1841
