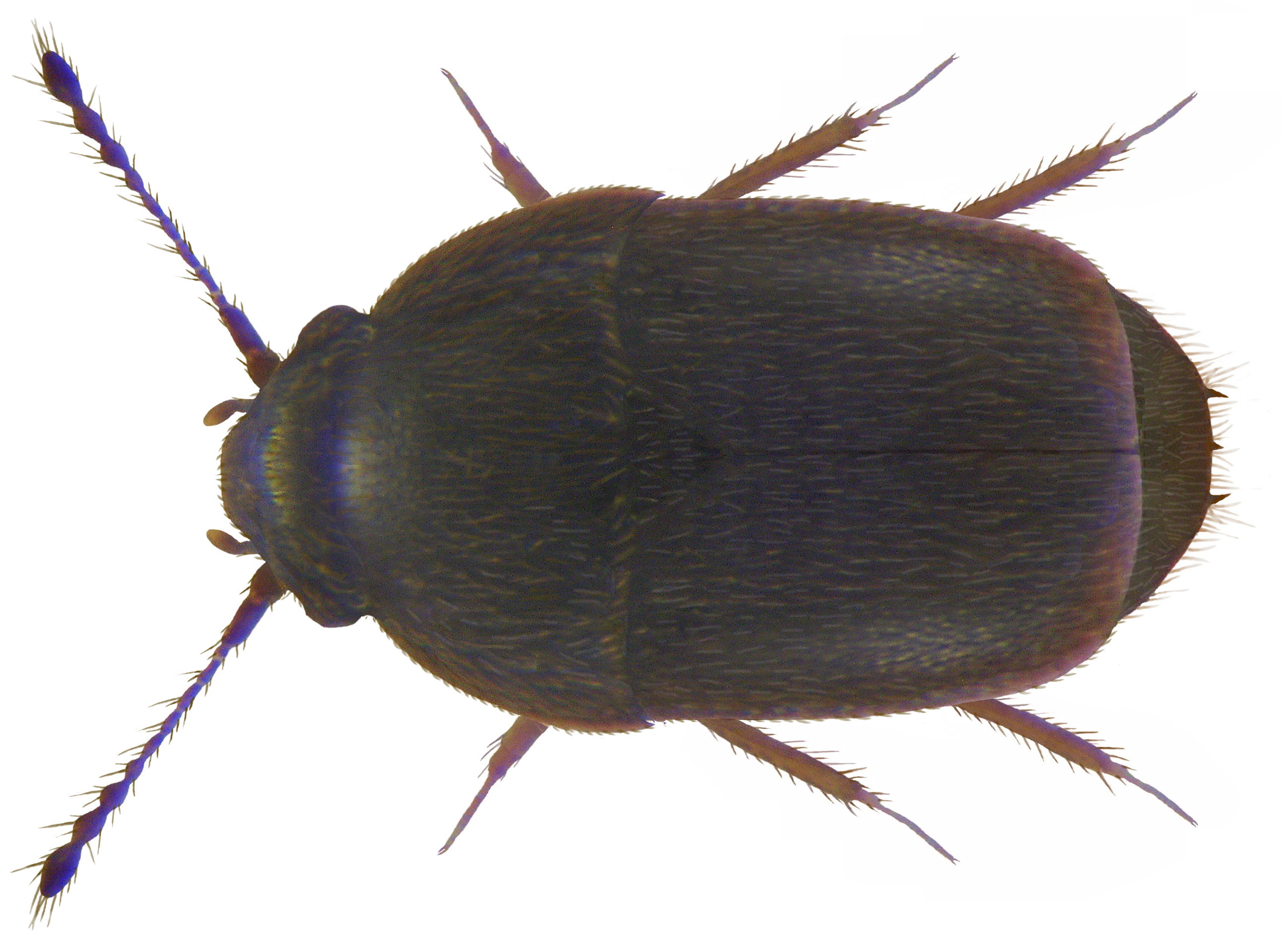
- Acrotrichis fascicularis

Scientific classification
- Domain: Eukaryota
- Kingdom: Animalia
- Phylum: Arthropoda
- Class: Insecta
- Order: Coleoptera
- Suborder: Polyphaga
- Infraorder: Staphyliniformia
- Family: Ptiliidae
- Tribe: Acrotrichini
- Genus: Acrotrichis; Motschoulsky, 1848

Synonyms
- Trichopteryx Kirby, 1826 (Preocc.); Acratrichis Motschoulsky, 1850 (Missp.); Ptilopterium Gistl, 1850; Cleopterium Gistl, 1856; Cleopteryx Gistl, 1857; Ctenopteryx Flach, 1889; Macdonaldium Abdullah & Abdullah, 1967; Capotrichis Johnson, 1969; Flachiana Sundt, 1969

= Acrotrichis =

Genus of beetles

Acrotrichis is a genus of beetles belonging to the family Ptiliidae.

The genus was described in 1848 by Victor Motschulsky.

The genus has cosmopolitan distribution.

== Selected species ==
- Acrotrichis africana Johnson, 1969
- Acrotrichis australica (Deane, 1930)
- Acrotrichis cervina (Deane, 1931)
- Acrotrichis discoloroides Johnson, 1969
- Acrotrichis grandis (Deane, 1932)
- Acrotrichis insularis (Mäklin, 1852)
- Acrotrichis josephi (A.Matthews, 1872)
- Acrotrichis norfolkensis (Deane, 1931)
- Acrotrichis quadrilatica (Deane, 1932)
- Acrotrichis walkomi (Deane, 1931)
