= Atholus sedecimstriatus =

Scientific classification
- Kingdom: Animalia
- Phylum: Arthropoda
- Class: Insecta
- Order: Coleoptera
- Suborder: Polyphaga
- Infraorder: Staphyliniformia
- Family: Histeridae
- Genus: Atholus
- Species: A. sedecimstriatus

Binomial name
- Atholus sedecimstriatus (Say, 1825)

Species of beetle

Atholus sedecimstriatus is a species of clown beetle in the family Histeridae. It is found in North America.
