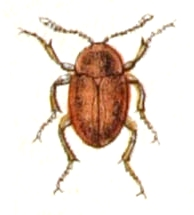
- Sciodrepoides fumatus

Scientific classification
- Domain: Eukaryota
- Kingdom: Animalia
- Phylum: Arthropoda
- Class: Insecta
- Order: Coleoptera
- Suborder: Polyphaga
- Infraorder: Staphyliniformia
- Family: Leiodidae
- Subfamily: Cholevinae
- Tribe: Cholevini
- Genus: Sciodrepoides; Hatch, 1933

= Sciodrepoides =

Genus of beetles

Sciodrepoides is a genus of small carrion beetles in the family Leiodidae. There are about five described species in Sciodrepoides.

== Species ==
These five species belong to the genus Sciodrepoides:

- Sciodrepoides alpestris Jeannel, 1934^{g}
- Sciodrepoides fumatus (Spence, 1815)^{g}
- Sciodrepoides latinotum Peck and Cook, 2002^{i g}
- Sciodrepoides terminans (LeConte, 1850)^{i g b}
- Sciodrepoides watsoni (Spence, 1815)^{i g b}

Data sources: i = ITIS, c = Catalogue of Life, g = GBIF, b = Bugguide.net
