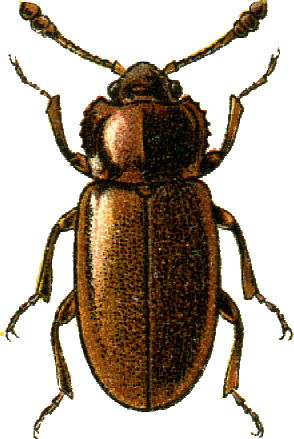
- Henoticus serratus

Scientific classification
- Kingdom: Animalia
- Phylum: Arthropoda
- Clade: Pancrustacea
- Class: Insecta
- Order: Coleoptera
- Suborder: Polyphaga
- Infraorder: Cucujiformia
- Family: Cryptophagidae
- Tribe: Cryptophagini
- Genus: Henoticus; Thomson, 1868

= Henoticus =

Genus of beetles

Henoticus is a genus of silken fungus beetles in the family Cryptophagidae. There are at least four described species in Henoticus.

== Species ==
These four species belong to the genus Henoticus:

- Henoticus californicus (Mannerheim, 1843)
- Henoticus mycetoecus (Park, 1929)
- Henoticus serratus (Gyllenhal, 1808)
- Henoticus sinensis Bruce, 1943
