= Sciodrepoides alpestris =

Scientific classification
- Domain: Eukaryota
- Kingdom: Animalia
- Phylum: Arthropoda
- Class: Insecta
- Order: Coleoptera
- Suborder: Polyphaga
- Infraorder: Staphyliniformia
- Family: Leiodidae
- Genus: Sciodrepoides
- Species: S. alpestris

Binomial name
- Sciodrepoides alpestris Jeannel, 1934

Species of beetle

Sciodrepoides alpestris is a species of beetle in the Leiodidae family that can be found in such European countries as Austria, Belarus, Bosnia and Herzegovina, Czech Republic, Finland, Italy, Poland, Romania, Slovakia, and Oriental region.
