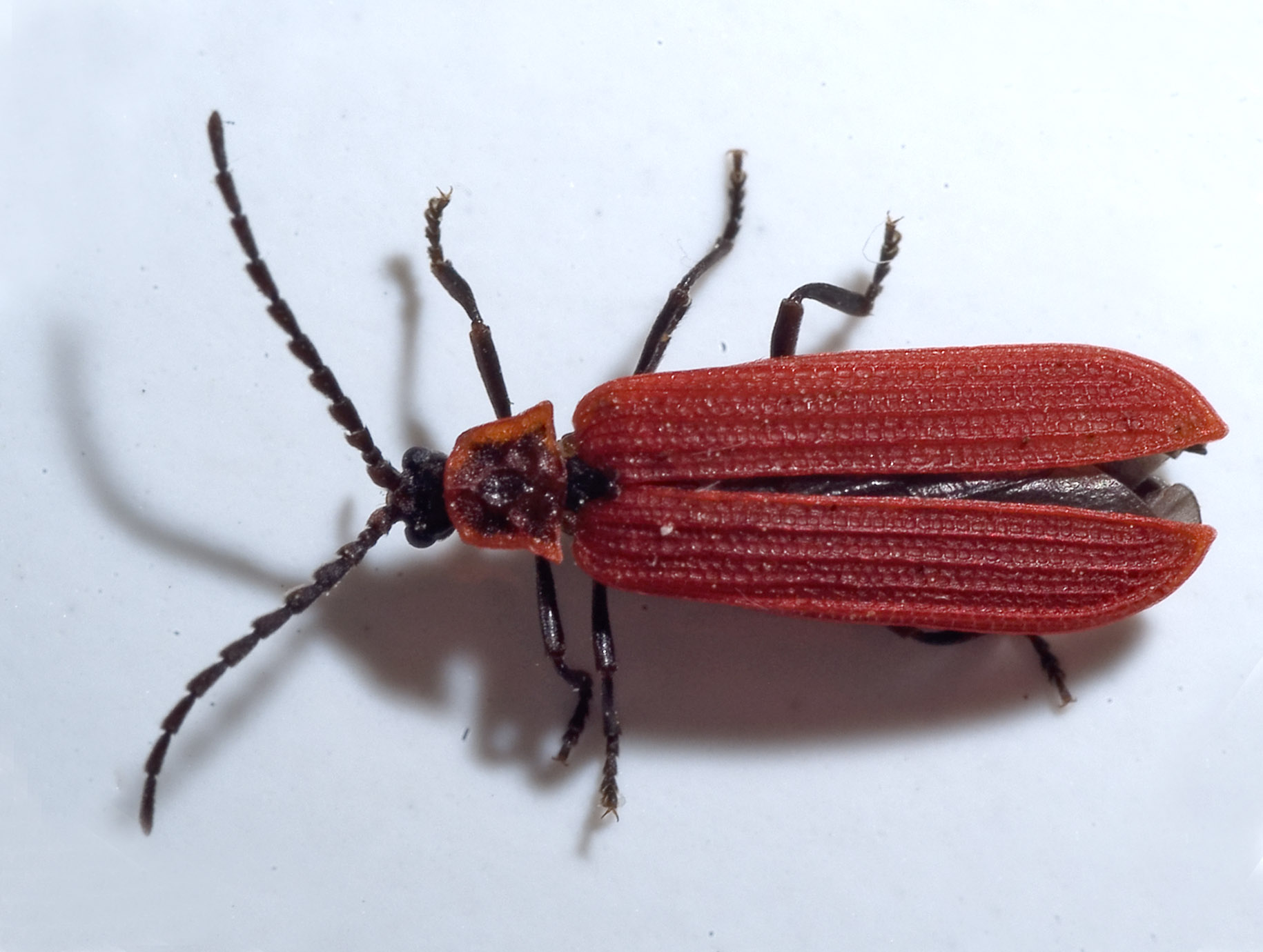
- Dictyoptera aurora

Scientific classification
- Kingdom: Animalia
- Phylum: Arthropoda
- Clade: Pancrustacea
- Class: Insecta
- Order: Coleoptera
- Suborder: Polyphaga
- Infraorder: Elateriformia
- Family: Lycidae
- Subfamily: Erotinae
- Genus: Dictyoptera; Latreille, 1829

Synonyms
- Dictyopterus Mulsant, 1838; Dyctioptera Leconte, 1847; Dyctiopterus Erichson, 1847; Dyctyopterus Dejean, 1833

= Dictyoptera (beetle) =

Genus of beetles

Dictyoptera is a genus of net-winged beetles in the family Lycidae. There are several described species in Dictyoptera.

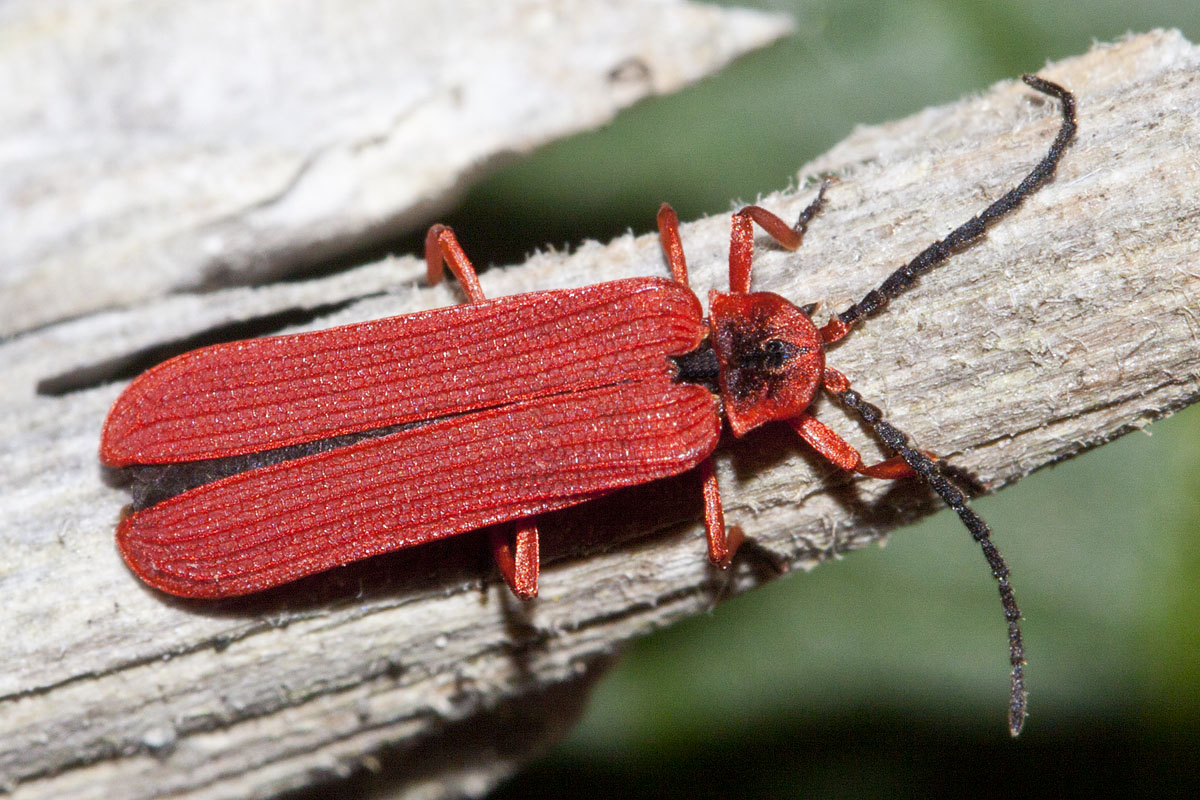
Dictyoptera simplicipes

== Species ==
Selected species:

- Dictyoptera aurora (Herbst, 1784) (golden net-wing beetle) – Eurasia (Western Europe plus Russia, etc), North Korea, South Korea, Japan
- Dictyoptera bicoloricornis (Pic, 1933) – China
- Dictyoptera coccinata (Say, 183) – Canada, USA
- Dictyoptera elegans Nakane & Winkler, 1952 – Japan
- Dictyoptera formosana Nakane, 1968 – Taiwan
- Dictyoptera forticornis Pic, 1942 – China
- Dictyoptera gansuensis Kazantsev, 2004 – China
- Dictyoptera gorhami Köno, 1932 – Japan, Taiwan
- Dictyoptera marginicollis Boheman, 1858 – Hong Kong
- Dictyoptera sapporensis Köno, 1932 – Japan
- Dictyoptera speciosa Ohbayashi, 1954 – Japan
- Dictyoptera velata Gorharn, 1883 – Japan

[?] Dictyoptera simplicipes Mannerheim, 1843 (Not in)

Else for Dictyoptera hamata see Punicealis hamata (Mannerheim, 1843). For Dictyoptera munda see Punicealis munda (Say, 1835).
