= Nephanes =

Scientific classification
- Domain: Eukaryota
- Kingdom: Animalia
- Phylum: Arthropoda
- Class: Insecta
- Order: Coleoptera
- Suborder: Polyphaga
- Infraorder: Staphyliniformia
- Family: Ptiliidae
- Tribe: Nephanini
- Genus: Nephanes; Thomson, 1859

Genus of beetles

Nephanes is a genus of beetles belonging to the family Ptiliidae.

Species:

- Nephanes euphorbiicola Israelson, 1976
- Nephanes titan (Newman, 1834)
