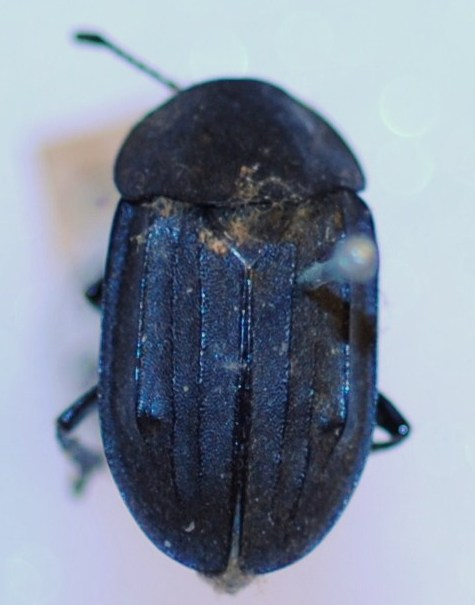

Scientific classification
- Kingdom: Animalia
- Phylum: Arthropoda
- Clade: Pancrustacea
- Class: Insecta
- Order: Coleoptera
- Suborder: Polyphaga
- Infraorder: Staphyliniformia
- Family: Staphylinidae
- Genus: Aclypea
- Species: A. bituberosa

Binomial name
- Aclypea bituberosa (LeConte, 1859)

= Aclypea bituberosa =

Species of beetle

Aclypea bituberosa, the western spinach carrion beetle, is a species of carrion beetle in the family Silphidae. It is found in North America.
