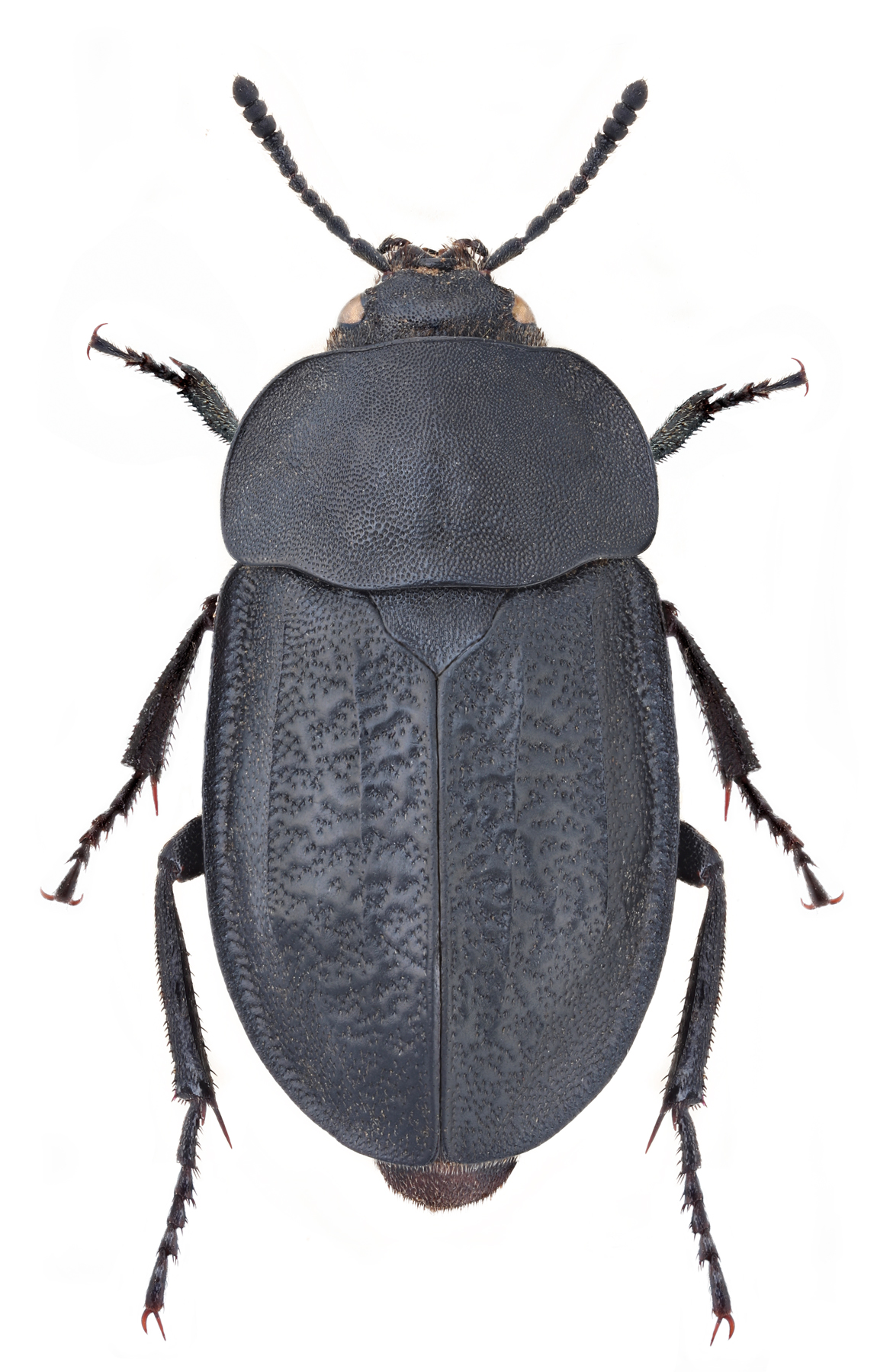

Scientific classification
- Kingdom: Animalia
- Phylum: Arthropoda
- Clade: Pancrustacea
- Class: Insecta
- Order: Coleoptera
- Suborder: Polyphaga
- Infraorder: Staphyliniformia
- Family: Staphylinidae
- Genus: Aclypea
- Species: A. undata

Binomial name
- Aclypea undata (Müller, 1776)

= Aclypea undata =

Species of beetle

Aclypea undata is a species of beetle belonging to the family Silphidae.

It is native to Europe.
