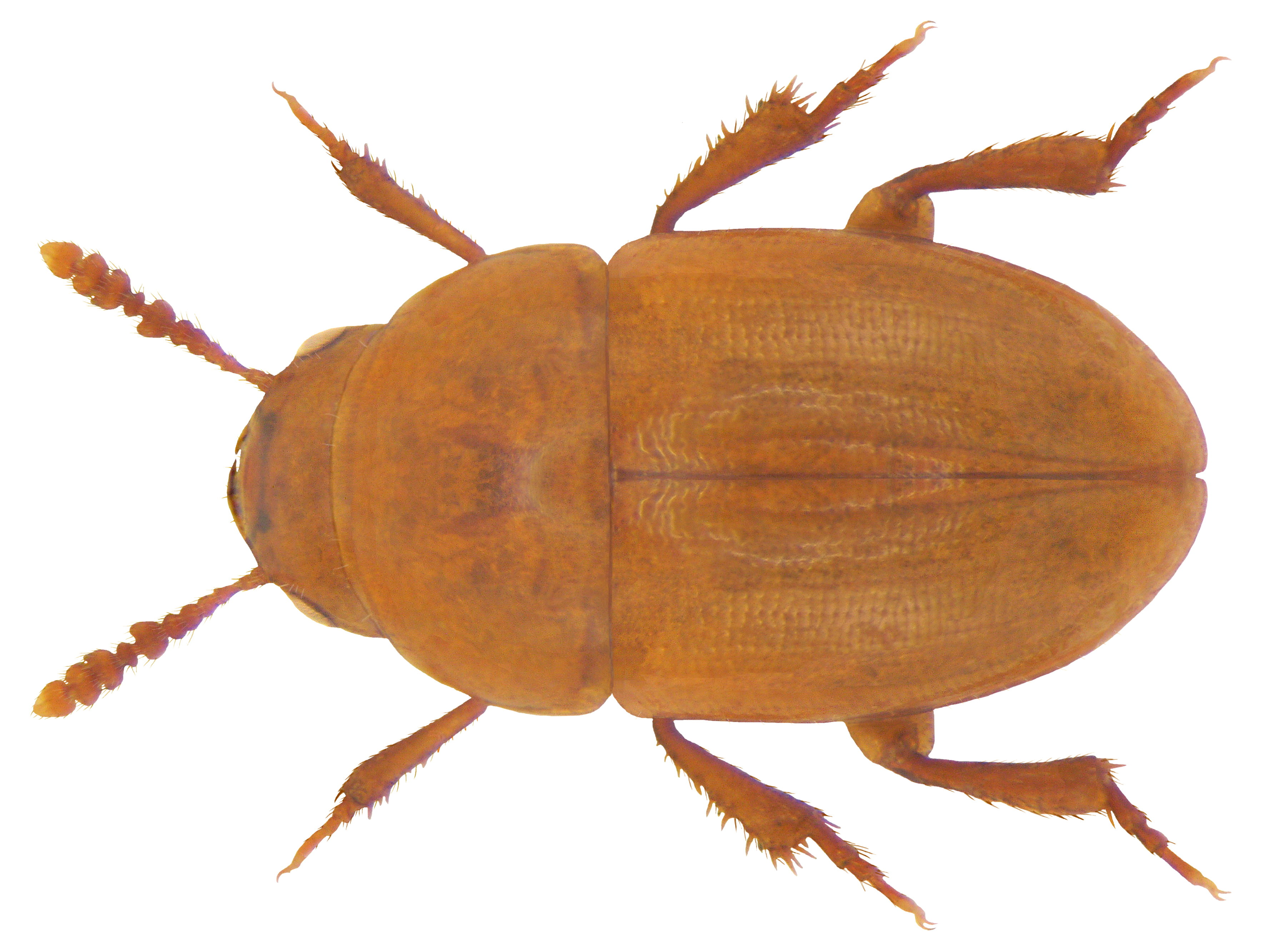

Scientific classification
- Domain: Eukaryota
- Kingdom: Animalia
- Phylum: Arthropoda
- Class: Insecta
- Order: Coleoptera
- Suborder: Polyphaga
- Infraorder: Staphyliniformia
- Family: Leiodidae
- Genus: Agaricophagus
- Species: A. cephalotes

Binomial name
- Agaricophagus cephalotes Schmidt, 1841

= Agaricophagus cephalotes =

Species of beetle

Agaricophagus cephalotes is a species of beetle belonging to the family Leiodidae.

It is native to Europe and Greenland.
