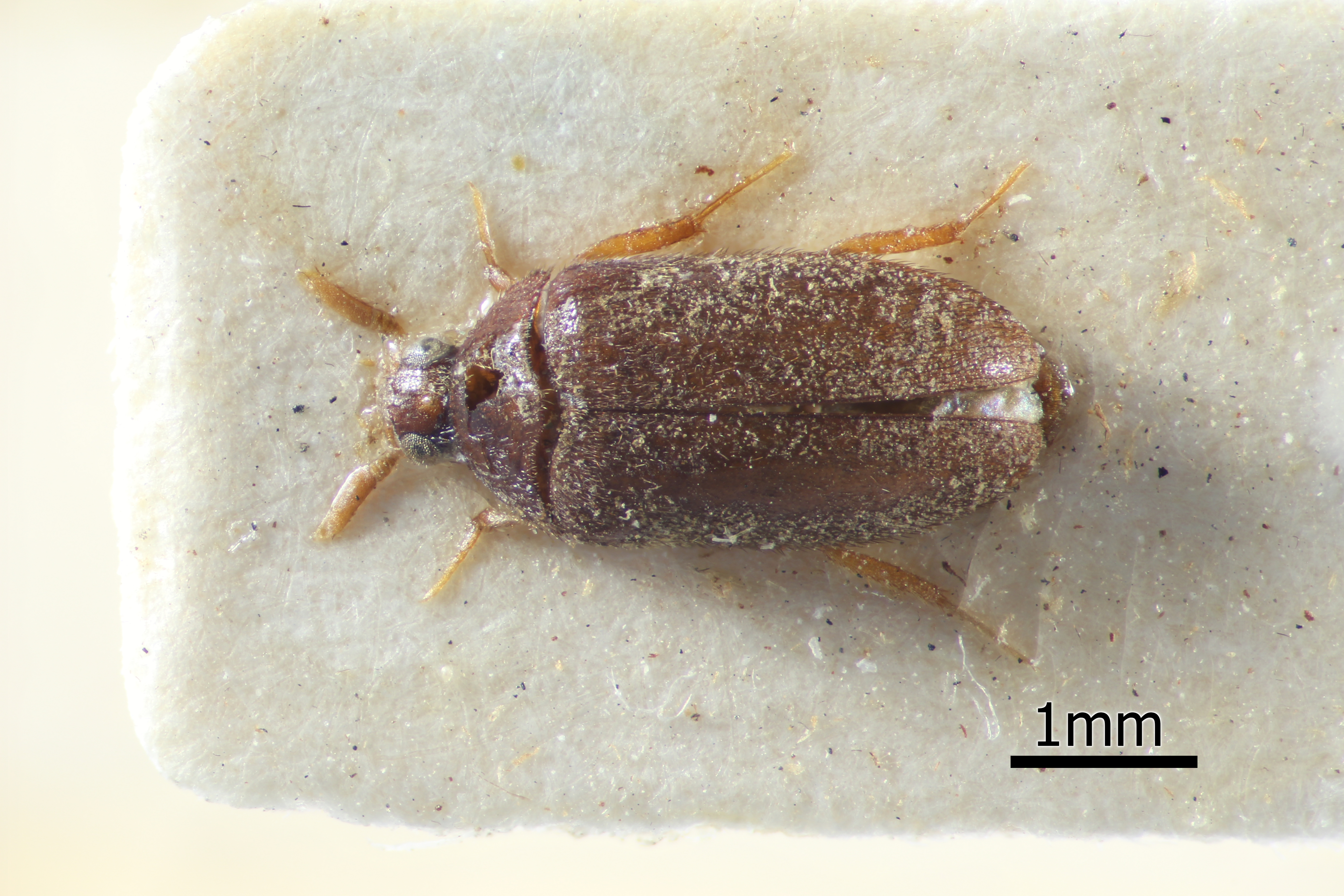

Scientific classification
- Kingdom: Animalia
- Phylum: Arthropoda
- Clade: Pancrustacea
- Class: Insecta
- Order: Coleoptera
- Suborder: Polyphaga
- Family: Dermestidae
- Genus: Attagenus
- Species: A. cyphonoides

Binomial name
- Attagenus cyphonoides Reitter, 1881

Synonyms
- Attagenus alfierii Pic, 1910; Trogoderma cyphonoides (Reitter, 1881)

= Attagenus cyphonoides =

Species of beetle

Attagenus cyphonoides is a species of carpet beetle in the subfamily Attageninae, family Dermestidae.

It is known from:

- Asia: Afghanistan, China, Central Asia, Mongolia, India, Pakistan, Iran, Iraq, Russia, Israel, Saudi Arabia;
- Africa: Egypt, Morocco, Nigeria, Senegal, South Sudan, Sudan, Tunisia;
- Europe
- North America

Introduced in Australia with records from Queensland.
