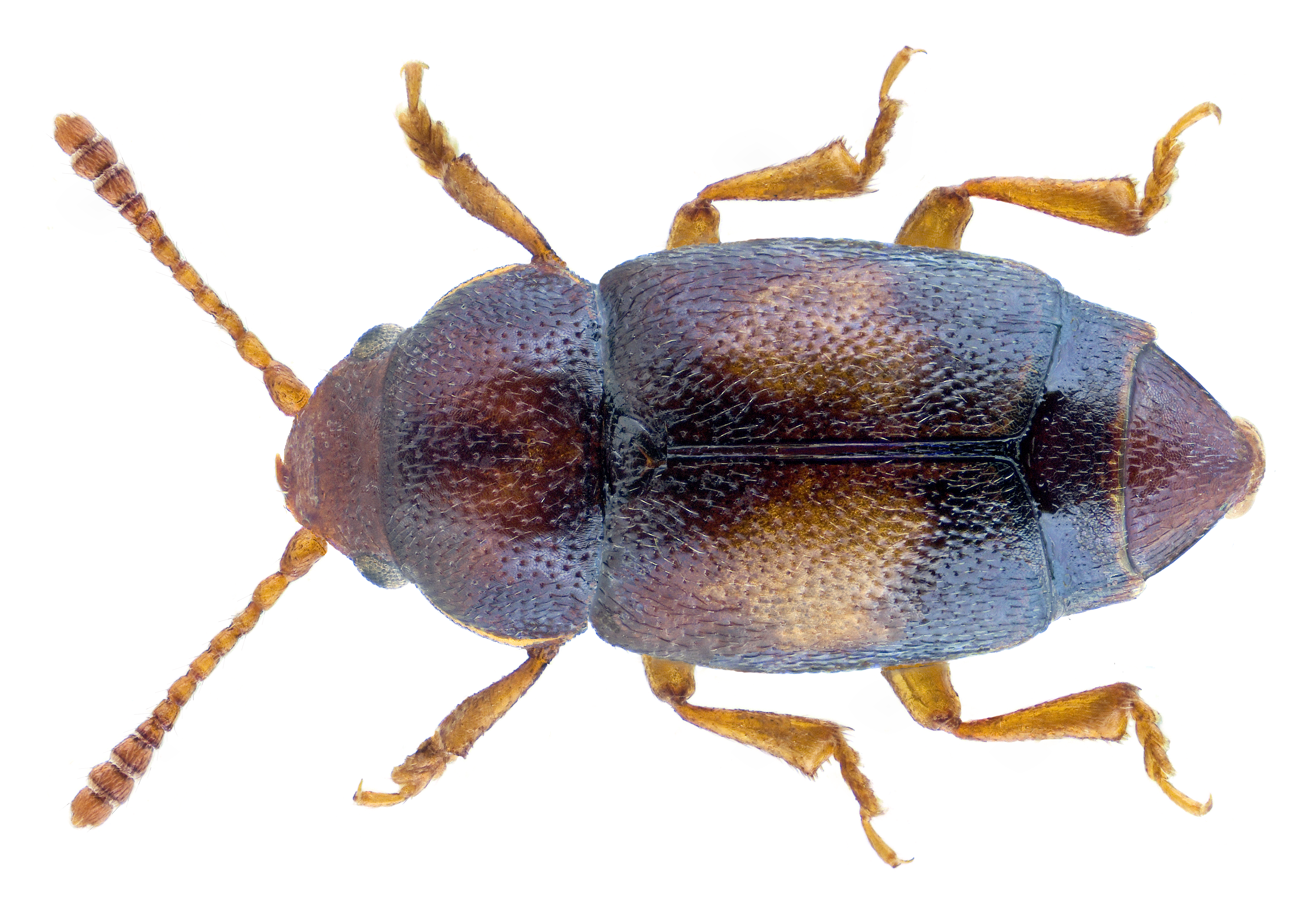
- Kateretes pusillus

Scientific classification
- Kingdom: Animalia
- Phylum: Arthropoda
- Class: Insecta
- Order: Coleoptera
- Suborder: Polyphaga
- Infraorder: Cucujiformia
- Family: Kateretidae
- Genus: Kateretes; Herbst, 1793

Subgenera
- (Kateretes); (Pulion)

= Kateretes =

Genus of beetles

Kateretes is a genus of short-winged flower beetles in the family Kateretidae. There are about six described species in Kateretes.

== Species ==
These six species belong to the genus Kateretes:

- Kateretes dalmatinus (Sturm, 1844)^{g}
- Kateretes flavicans (Fairmaire, 1860)^{g}
- Kateretes mixtus Kirejtshuk, 1989^{g}
- Kateretes pusillus (Thunberg, 1794)^{g b}
- Kateretes rufilabris (Latreille, 1807)^{g}
- Kateretes scissus (Parsons, 1943)^{i c g}

Data sources: i = ITIS, c = Catalogue of Life, g = GBIF, b = Bugguide.net
