= Dorcatoma serra =

Scientific classification
- Kingdom: Animalia
- Phylum: Arthropoda
- Class: Insecta
- Order: Coleoptera
- Suborder: Polyphaga
- Family: Ptinidae
- Genus: Dorcatoma
- Species: D. serra

Binomial name
- Dorcatoma serra (Panzer, 1796)

Species of beetle

Dorcatoma serra is a species of beetle in the family Ptinidae from Europe. It is often considered to be a synonym of Dorcatoma substriata.

This beetle has been noted feeding on the fungus Inonotus radiatus, which grows on several types of trees.
