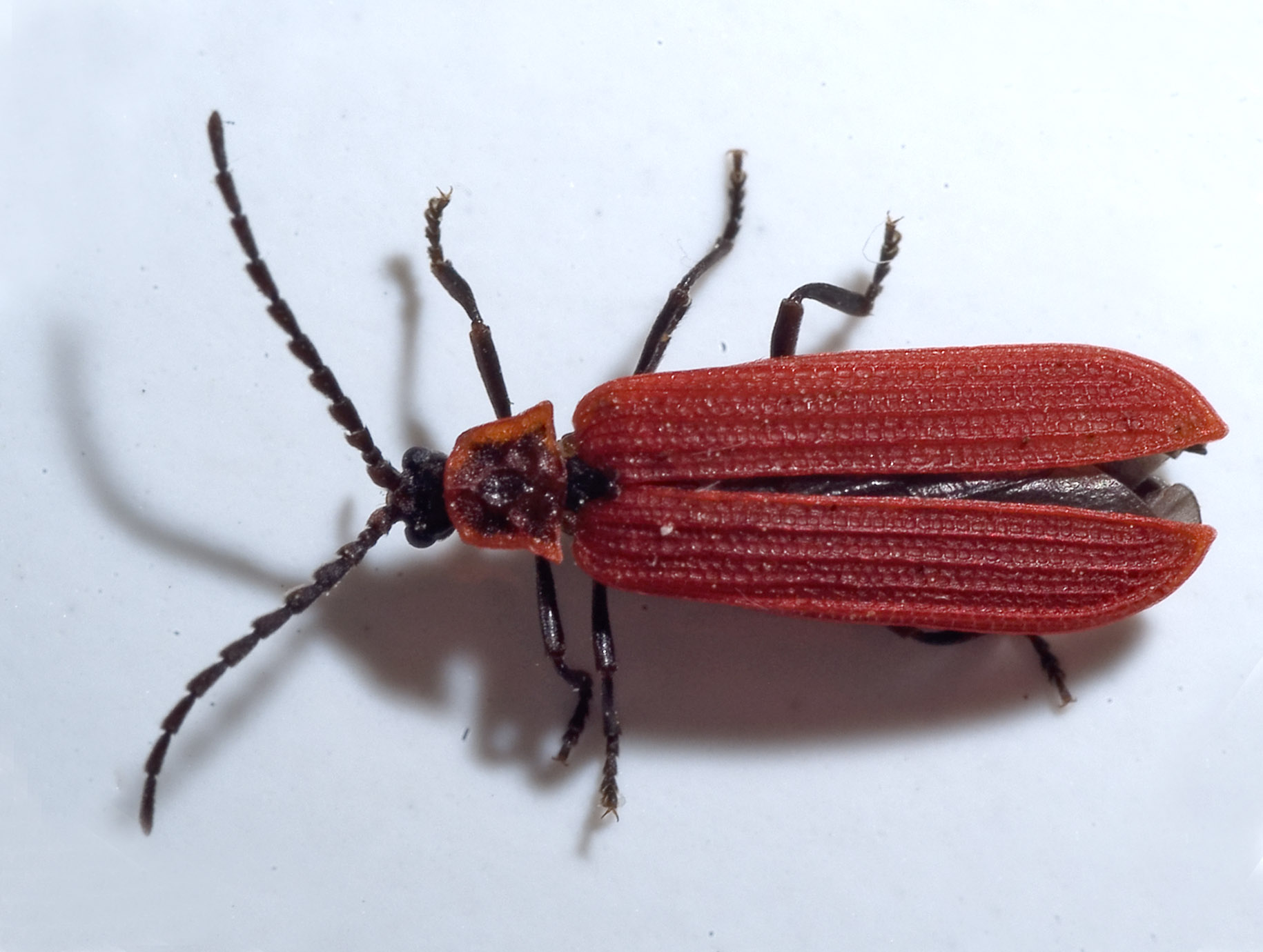

Scientific classification
- Kingdom: Animalia
- Phylum: Arthropoda
- Class: Insecta
- Order: Coleoptera
- Suborder: Polyphaga
- Infraorder: Elateriformia
- Family: Lycidae
- Genus: Dictyoptera
- Species: D. aurora

Binomial name
- Dictyoptera aurora (Herbst, 1784)

= Dictyoptera aurora =

Species of beetle

Dictyoptera aurora, known generally as the golden net-wing or red net-winged beetle, is a species of net-winged beetle in the family Lycidae. It is found in North America, Siberia and Europe.

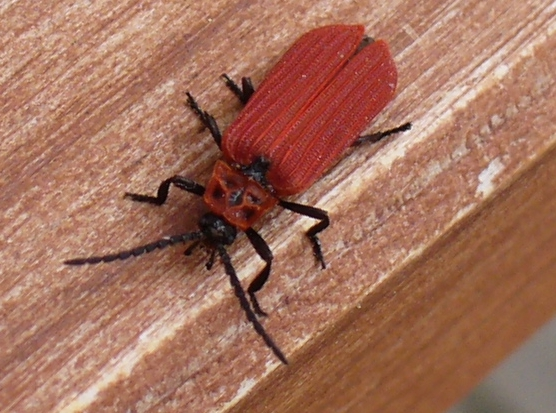
Golden net-wing, Dictyoptera aurora

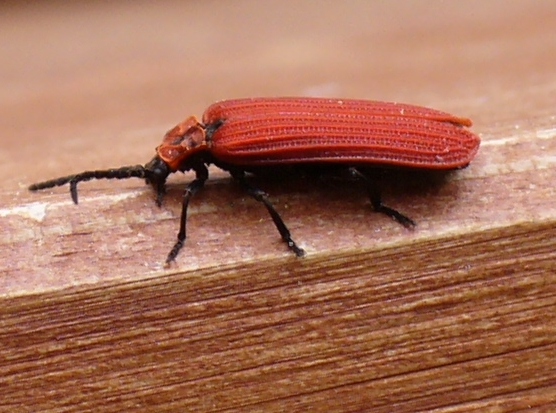
Golden net-wing, Dictyoptera aurora
