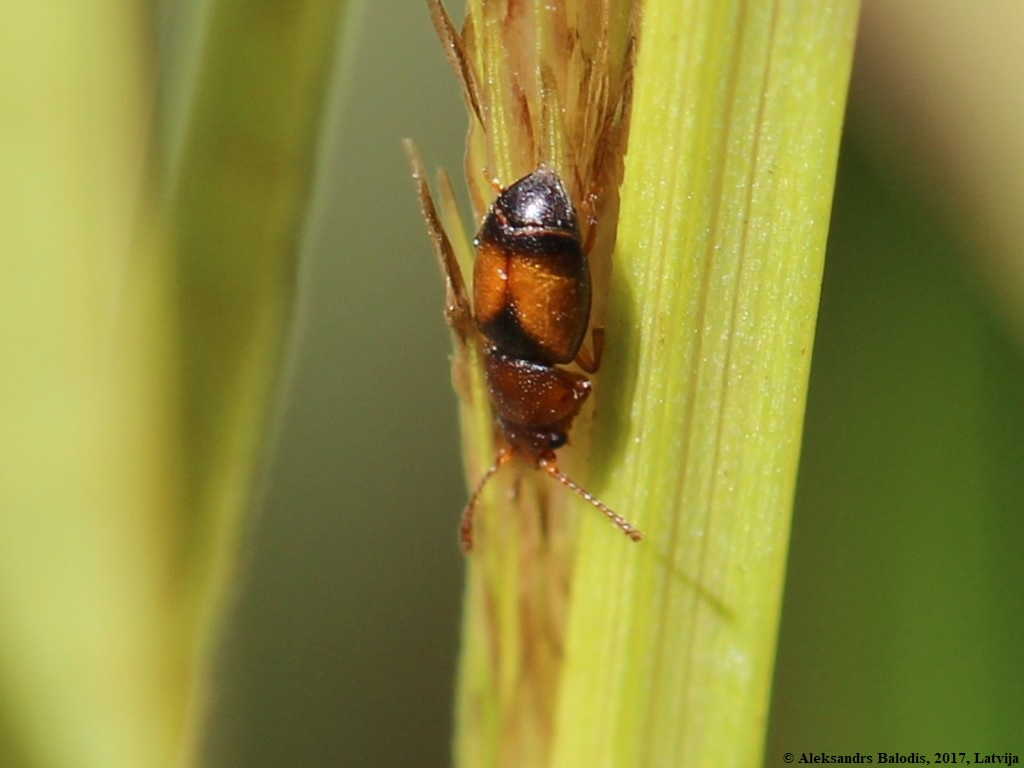

Scientific classification
- Kingdom: Animalia
- Phylum: Arthropoda
- Clade: Pancrustacea
- Class: Insecta
- Order: Coleoptera
- Suborder: Polyphaga
- Infraorder: Cucujiformia
- Family: Kateretidae
- Genus: Kateretes
- Species: K. pusillus

Binomial name
- Kateretes pusillus (Thunberg, 1794)

= Kateretes pusillus =

Species of beetle

Kateretes pusillus is a species of beetle belonging to the family Kateretidae.

It is native to Europe.
