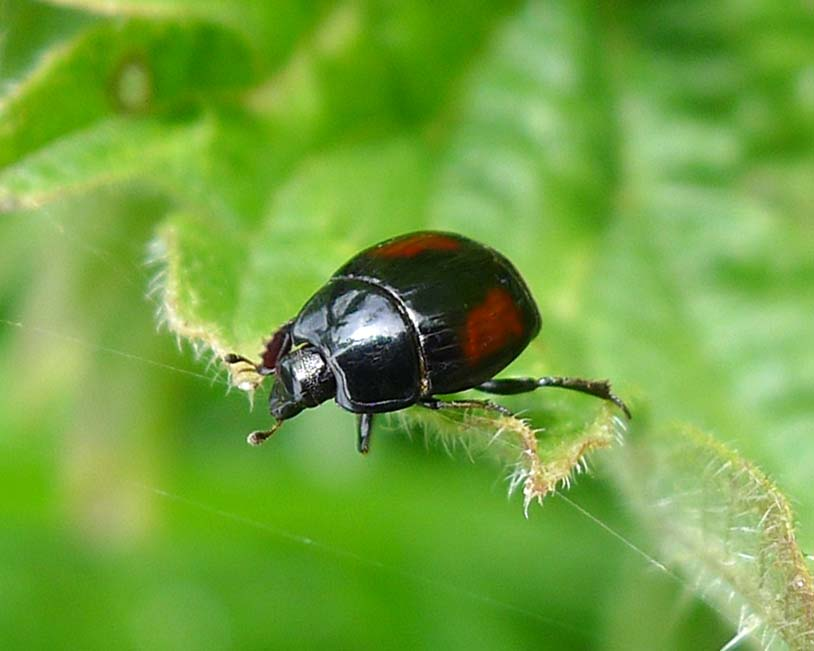

Scientific classification
- Kingdom: Animalia
- Phylum: Arthropoda
- Class: Insecta
- Order: Coleoptera
- Suborder: Polyphaga
- Infraorder: Staphyliniformia
- Family: Histeridae
- Genus: Atholus
- Species: A. bimaculatus

Binomial name
- Atholus bimaculatus (Linnaeus, 1758)

Synonyms
- Hister bimaculatus Linnaeus, 1758

= Atholus bimaculatus =

Spotted Clown Beetle

Species of beetle

Atholus bimaculatus, spotted clown beetle, is a species of clown beetle in the family Histeridae. It is found in Africa, Europe and Northern Asia (excluding China), North America, South America, and Southern Asia.

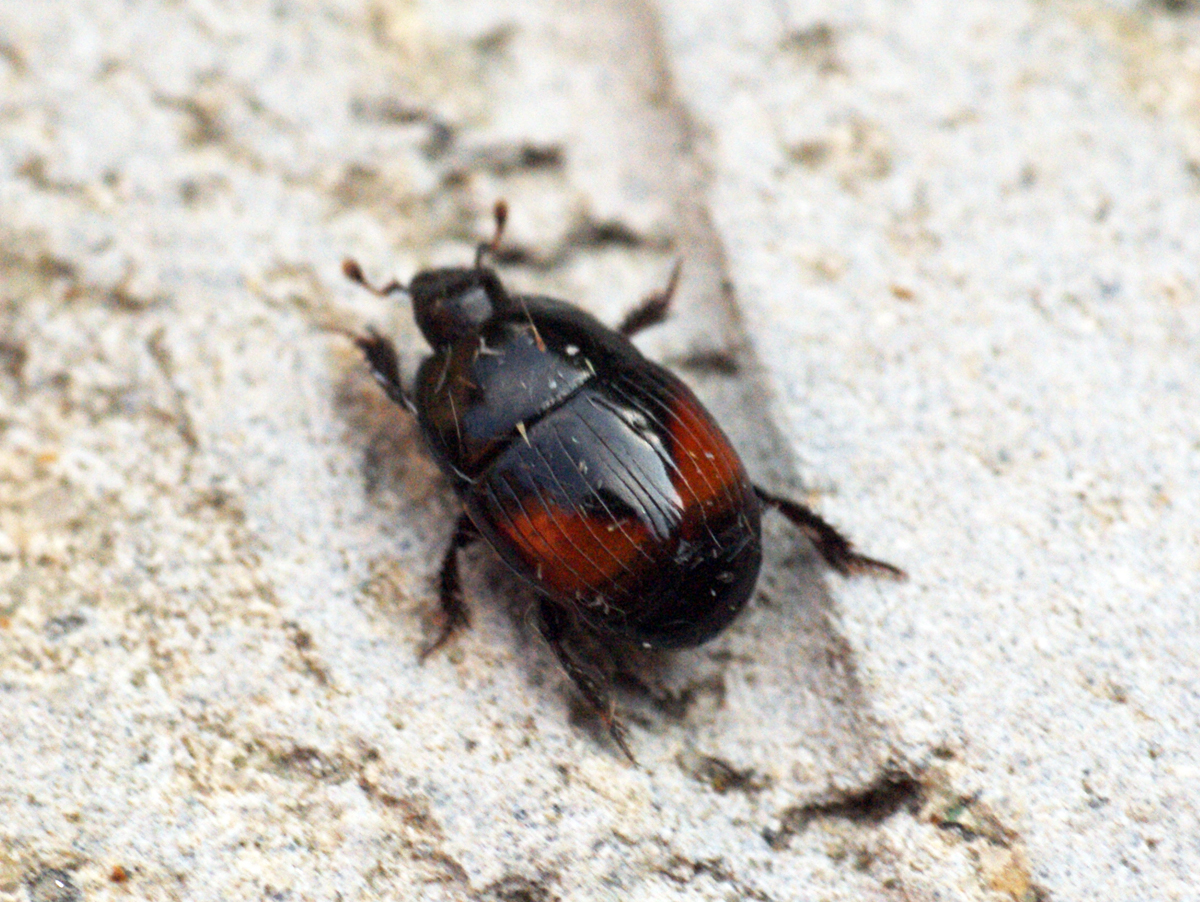
