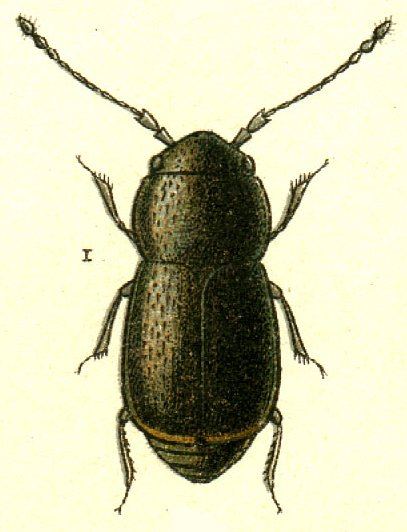
- An artist's rendition of the Nephanes titan beetle, from a sketch by Georgiy Jacobson.

Scientific classification
- Domain: Eukaryota
- Kingdom: Animalia
- Phylum: Arthropoda
- Class: Insecta
- Order: Coleoptera
- Suborder: Polyphaga
- Infraorder: Staphyliniformia
- Family: Ptiliidae
- Genus: Nephanes
- Species: N. titan

Binomial name
- Nephanes titan (Newman, 1834)

= Nephanes titan =

Species of beetle

Nephanes titan is a beetle from the Ptiliidae family of dwarf beetles. N. titan is notable for its exceptionally small body and simple nervous system. With an average maximum body length of only a few hundred micrometers, the beetle is one of the smallest non-parasitic insects in the world.

Despite its minuscule nervous system, the beetle is still capable of associative learning.
