= Tropicoptinus latefasciatus =

Scientific classification
- Kingdom: Animalia
- Phylum: Arthropoda
- Class: Insecta
- Order: Coleoptera
- Suborder: Polyphaga
- Family: Ptinidae
- Genus: Tropicoptinus
- Species: T. latefasciatus

Binomial name
- Tropicoptinus latefasciatus (Gorham, 1883)

Species of beetle

Tropicoptinus latefasciatus is a beetle species in the family Ptinidae.
