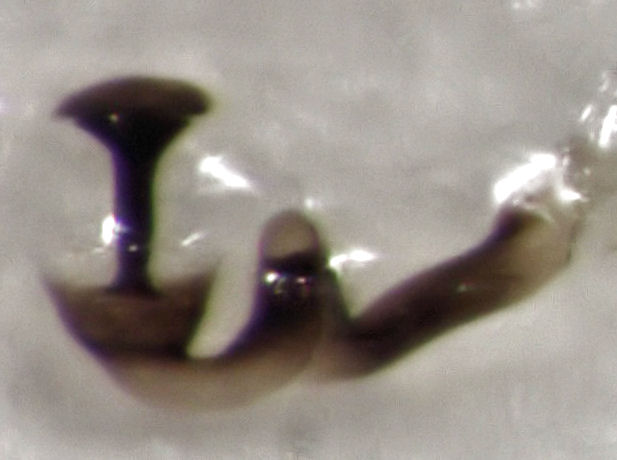
- Acrotrichis josephi (spermatheca)

Scientific classification
- Domain: Eukaryota
- Kingdom: Animalia
- Phylum: Arthropoda
- Class: Insecta
- Order: Coleoptera
- Suborder: Polyphaga
- Infraorder: Staphyliniformia
- Family: Ptiliidae
- Genus: Acrotrichis
- Species: A. josephi

Binomial name
- Acrotrichis josephi (Matthews, 1872)

Synonyms
- Acrotrichis subcognata Johnson, 1975; Trichopteryx josephi A.Matthews, 1872

= Acrotrichis josephi =

Species of beetle

Acrotrichis josephi is a species of feather-winged beetle.

== Distribution ==
In New Zealand, the species is exotic and present in the wild.
