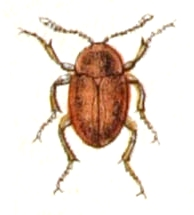

Scientific classification
- Kingdom: Animalia
- Phylum: Arthropoda
- Class: Insecta
- Order: Coleoptera
- Suborder: Polyphaga
- Infraorder: Staphyliniformia
- Family: Leiodidae
- Genus: Sciodrepoides
- Species: S. fumatus

Binomial name
- Sciodrepoides fumatus (Spence, 1815)

= Sciodrepoides fumatus =

Species of beetle

Sciodrepoides fumatus is a species of beetle in the Leiodidae family that can be found in such European territories as Austria, Belarus, Belgium, Great Britain including the Isle of Man, Czech Republic, France, Germany, Ireland, Italy, Latvia, the Netherlands, Poland, Russia, Scandinavia, Slovakia, Spain, Switzerland, Ukraine, and all countries of former Yugoslavia (except for North Macedonia).
