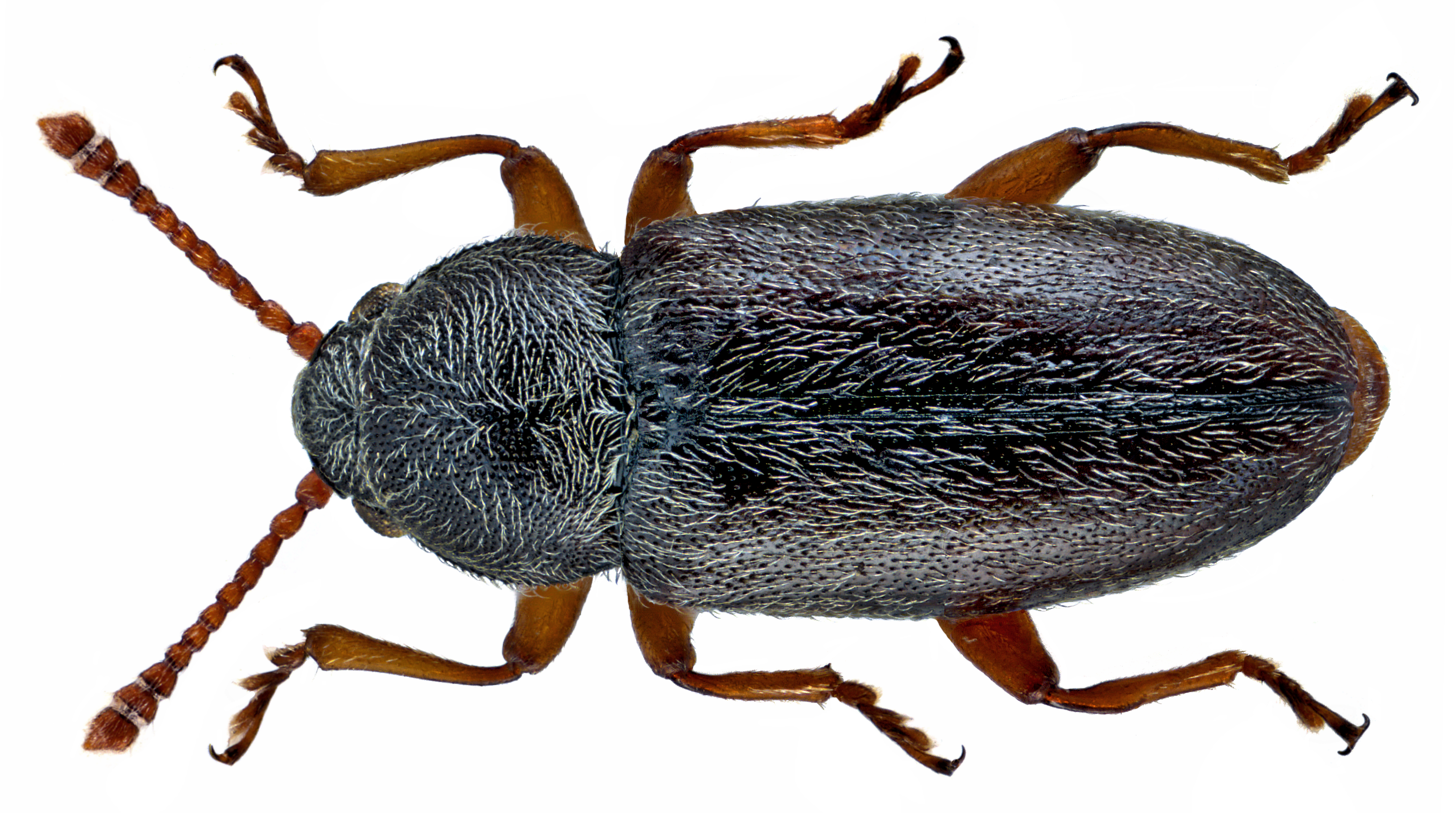

Scientific classification
- Kingdom: Animalia
- Phylum: Arthropoda
- Clade: Pancrustacea
- Class: Insecta
- Order: Coleoptera
- Suborder: Polyphaga
- Infraorder: Cucujiformia
- Family: Cryptophagidae
- Genus: Telmatophilus
- Species: T. caricis

Binomial name
- Telmatophilus caricis (Olivier, 1790)

= Telmatophilus caricis =

Species of beetle

Telmatophilus caricis is a species of silken fungus beetle native to Europe. Adults have a length of 2.3-2.8 mm.
