= Henoticus californicus =

Scientific classification
- Domain: Eukaryota
- Kingdom: Animalia
- Phylum: Arthropoda
- Class: Insecta
- Order: Coleoptera
- Suborder: Polyphaga
- Infraorder: Cucujiformia
- Family: Cryptophagidae
- Genus: Henoticus
- Species: H. californicus

Binomial name
- Henoticus californicus (Mannerheim, 1843)

Species of beetle

Henoticus californicus is a species of silken fungus beetle in the family Cryptophagidae. It is found in Central America, North America, and Europe.
