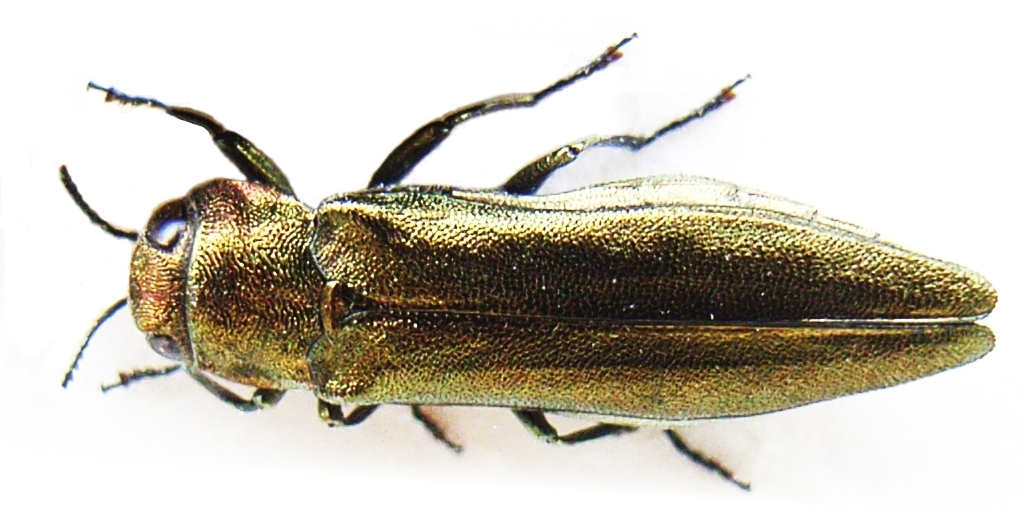

Scientific classification
- Kingdom: Animalia
- Phylum: Arthropoda
- Clade: Pancrustacea
- Class: Insecta
- Order: Coleoptera
- Suborder: Polyphaga
- Infraorder: Elateriformia
- Family: Buprestidae
- Genus: Agrilus
- Species: A. viridis

Binomial name
- Agrilus viridis (Linnaeus, 1758)

= Agrilus viridis =

Species of beetle

Agrilus viridis (beech splendour beetle) is a wood-boring beetle. It belongs to the jewel beetle family, Buprestidae.

Widely found in Europe, its larvae eat the wood of living trees — the favourite host plants are goat willow (Salix caprea), beech (Fagus) and birch (Betula), but they will inhabit a number of deciduous tree species. Occasionally the beetle may become a pest in horticulture or forestry.
