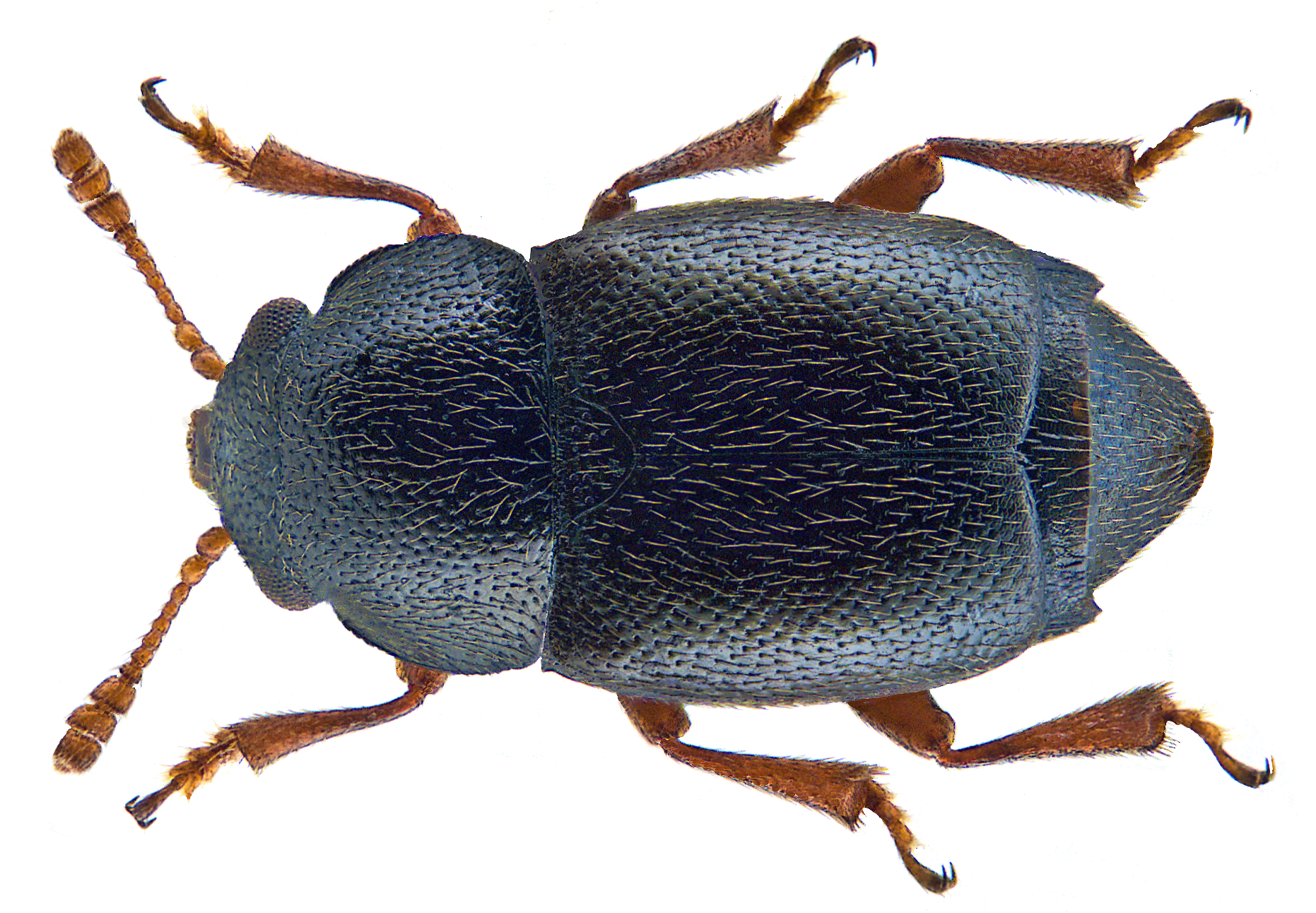
- Kateretes rufilabris 2.0 mm (1.5 to 2.2 mm)

Scientific classification
- Kingdom: Animalia
- Phylum: Arthropoda
- Class: Insecta
- Order: Coleoptera
- Suborder: Polyphaga
- Infraorder: Cucujiformia
- Family: Kateretidae
- Genus: Kateretes
- Species: K. rufilabris

Binomial name
- Kateretes rufilabris (Latreille, 1807)

= Kateretes rufilabris =

Species of beetle

Kateretes rufilabris is a species of short-winged flower beetles native to Europe.
