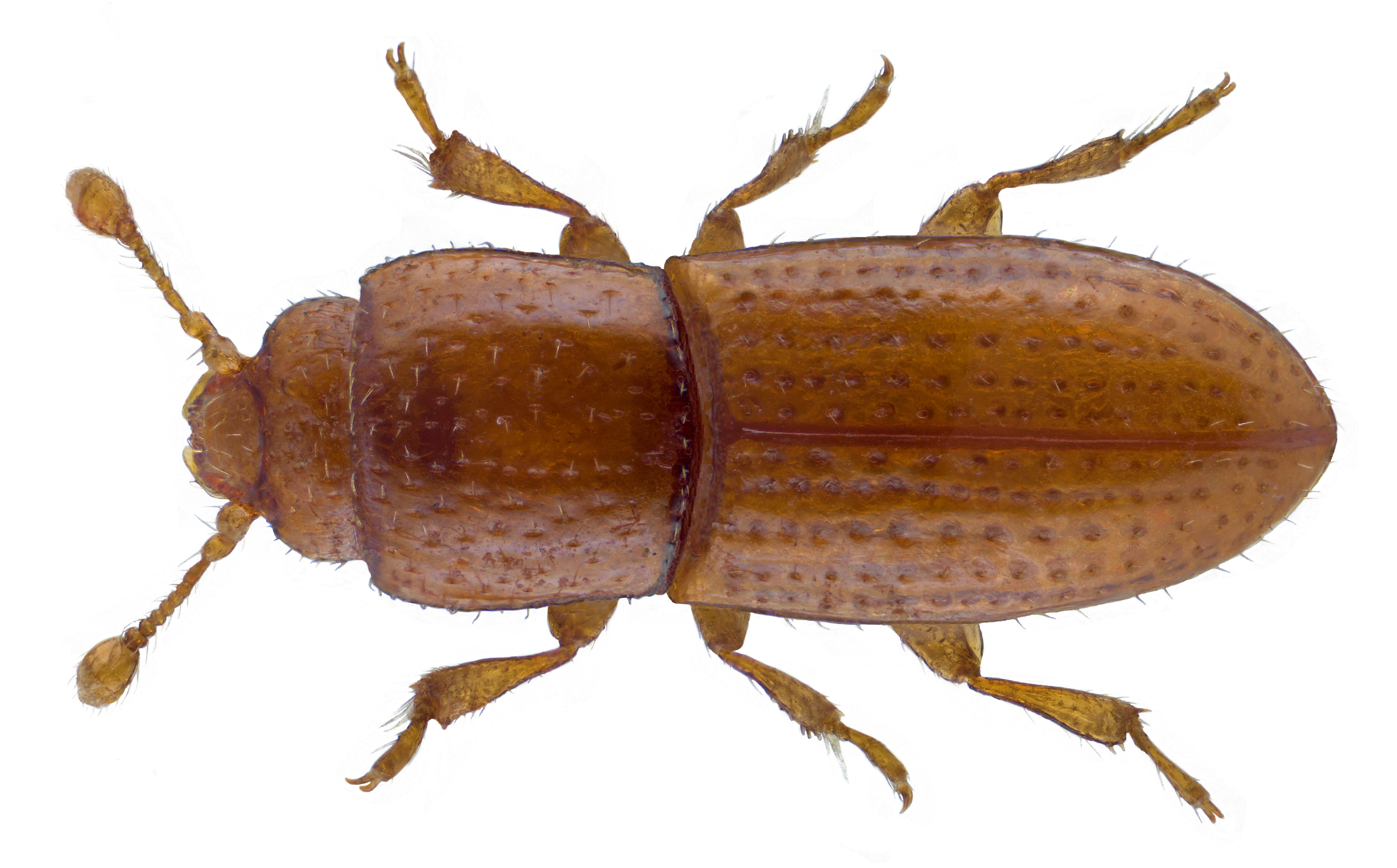
- Anommatus duodecimstriatus 1.8 mm

Scientific classification
- Kingdom: Animalia
- Phylum: Arthropoda
- Class: Insecta
- Order: Coleoptera
- Suborder: Polyphaga
- Infraorder: Cucujiformia
- Family: Teredidae
- Genus: Anommatus
- Species: A. duodecimstriatus

Binomial name
- Anommatus duodecimstriatus Müller, 1821

= Anommatus duodecimstriatus =

Species of beetle

Anommatus duodecimstriatus is a species of beetle in family Teredidae. It is found in the Palearctic region.
