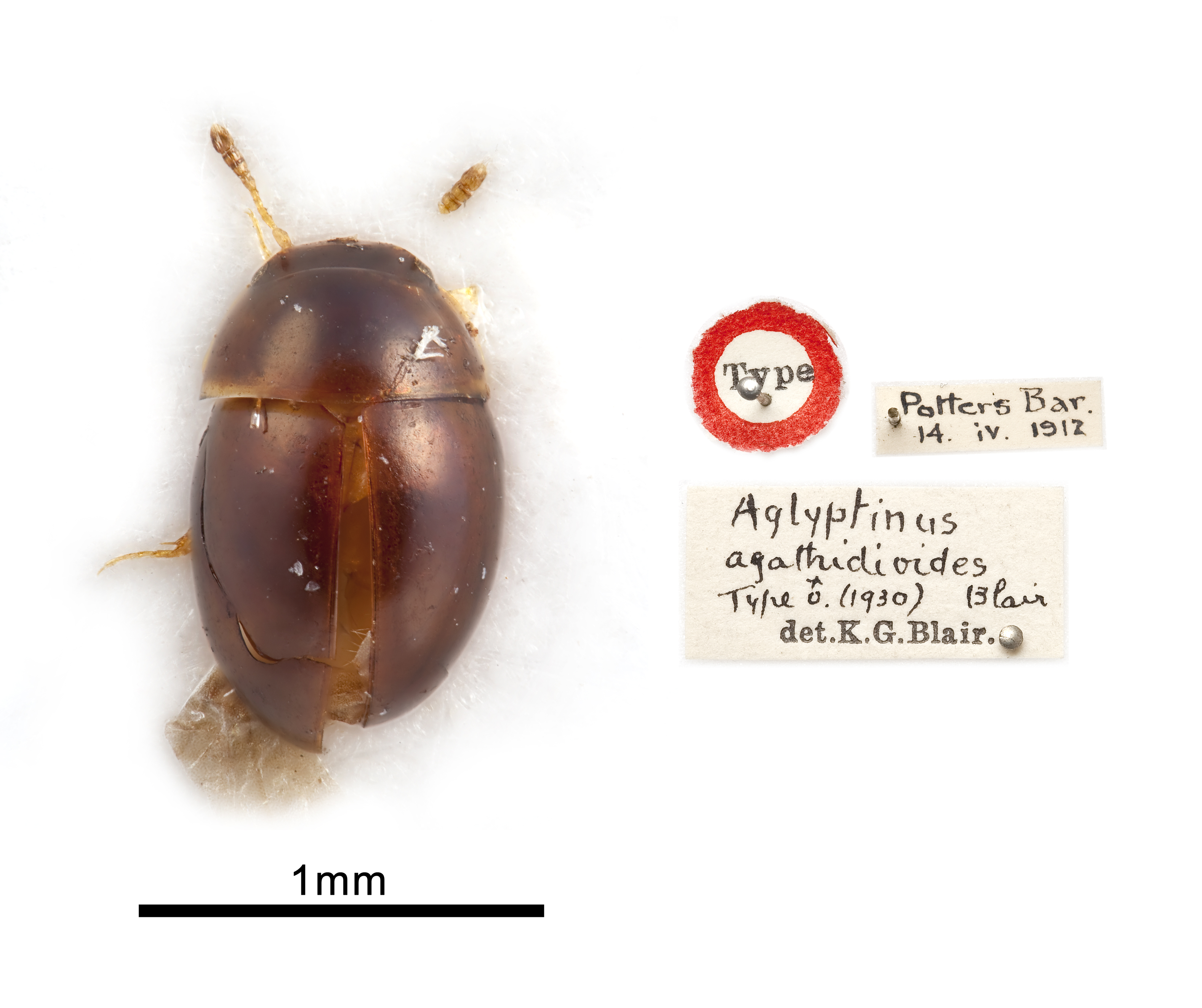

Scientific classification
- Kingdom: Animalia
- Phylum: Arthropoda
- Class: Insecta
- Order: Coleoptera
- Suborder: Polyphaga
- Infraorder: Staphyliniformia
- Family: Leiodidae
- Genus: Aglyptinus
- Species: A. agathidioides

Binomial name
- Aglyptinus agathidioides Blair, 1930

= Aglyptinus agathidioides =

Species of beetle

Aglyptinus agathidioides, commonly known as Potters Bar beetle, is a cryptic, poorly known beetle from the family Leiodidae. It is only known by two specimens discovered near Potters Bar, Hertfordshire, England, in 1912.

The two individuals, a male (holotype) and female (paratype), were collected in a common moorhen nest near Potters Bar on April 14, 1912 by amateur coleopterologist E. C. Bedwell. The male was presented to the Natural History Museum, the female stayed in Bedwell's collection which is now housed in the Norwich Castle Museum.

== Description ==
Measurements are only known from the holotype. It has a length of 1 mm. Its overall appearance is ovate, very convex, and nitid. The upperside is pitchy black. The sides and the lateral portions of the base of the thorax are testaceous. The underside, including the mouth, the elytra, the legs and the antennae are testaceous. The antennae are 11-jointed. The tarsi are slender and 3-jointed. The femora are wide and flattened.

== Provenance and conservation status ==
Both the provenance and the conservation status of this beetle are uncertain. While some experts, including the blogger and ornithologist Mark Avery or the biologist Justin Gerlach state that it might be an extinct beetle from the British Isles, others like the entomologist Jonathan Cooter regarded it as unintentional introduction. Aglyptinus is a genus which is widely distributed in Central America, and Aglyptinus agathidioides has in particular similarities to Aglyptinus minor from Guatemala. But neither intensive searches in England, particularly in mute swan and moorhen nests in Hertfordshire nor interviews with American entomologists have resulted in the rediscovery of this species.
