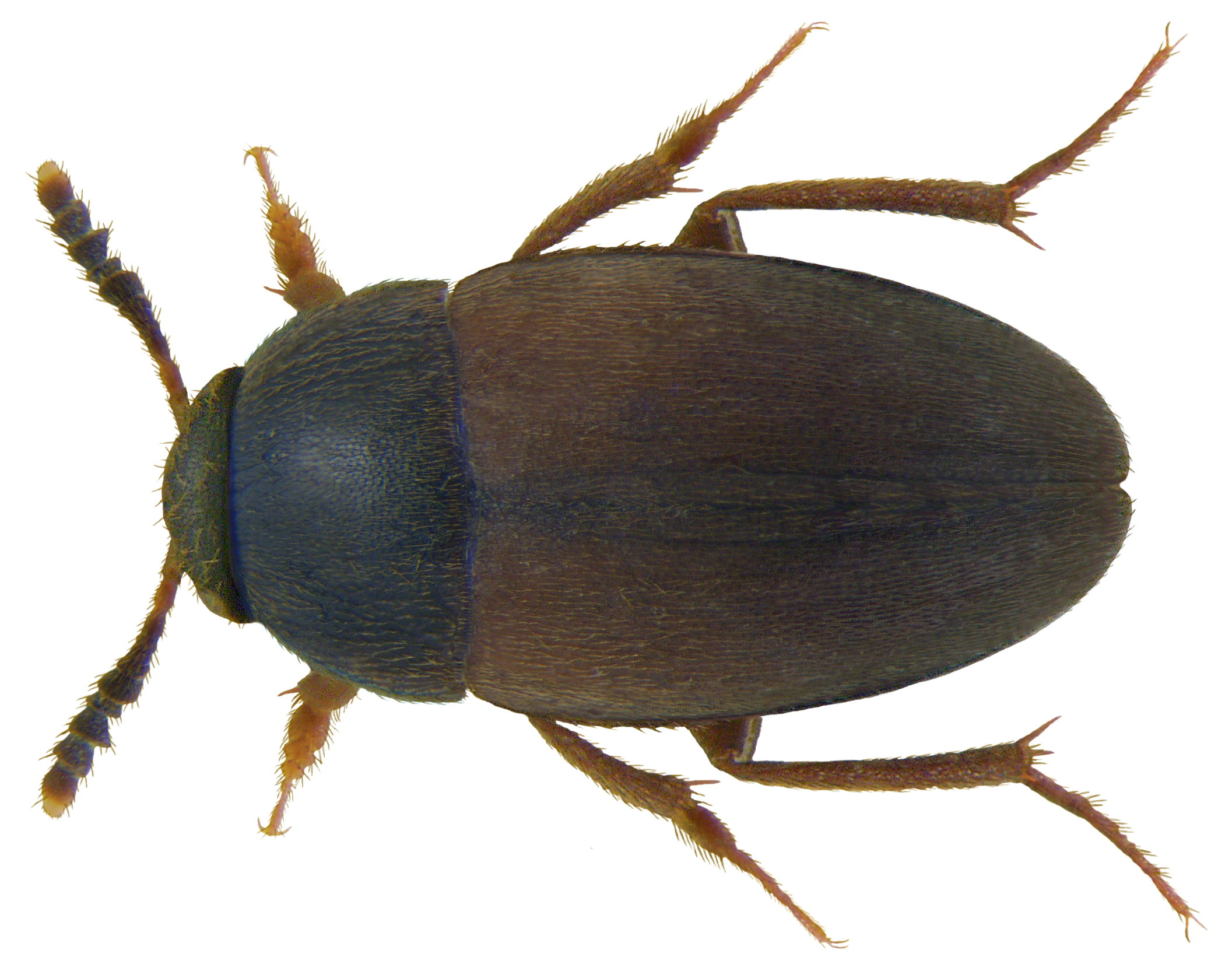

Scientific classification
- Kingdom: Animalia
- Phylum: Arthropoda
- Class: Insecta
- Order: Coleoptera
- Suborder: Polyphaga
- Infraorder: Staphyliniformia
- Family: Leiodidae
- Genus: Sciodrepoides
- Species: S. watsoni

Binomial name
- Sciodrepoides watsoni (Spence, 1815)

= Sciodrepoides watsoni =

Species of beetle

Sciodrepoides watsoni is a species of beetle in the Leiodidae family that can be found everywhere in Europe except for various European islands, Andorra, Estonia, Liechtenstein, Luxembourg, Moldova, Monaco, North Macedonia, Portugal, San Marino, and Vatican City.

S. watsoni is brown in color and are around 3 millimeters in length. The shape of their antennal segments help to distinguish them from other European species of Sciodrepoides. Larvae undergo three instars before maturing, and feed on decaying organic in all stages of their life. They are most active in the warmer seasons and will breed in temperatures of 15°C to 25°C.
