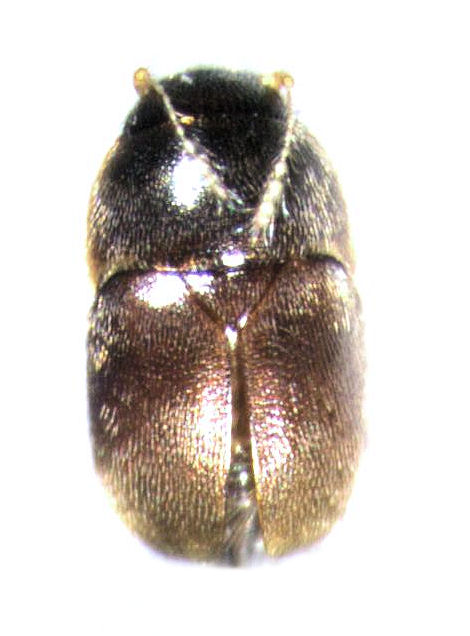

Scientific classification
- Domain: Eukaryota
- Kingdom: Animalia
- Phylum: Arthropoda
- Class: Insecta
- Order: Coleoptera
- Suborder: Polyphaga
- Infraorder: Staphyliniformia
- Family: Ptiliidae
- Genus: Acrotrichis
- Species: A. insularis

Binomial name
- Acrotrichis insularis (Mäklin in Mannerheim, 1852)

Synonyms
- Acrotrichis subantarctica Gressitt & Samuelson, 1964; Trichopteryx insularis Mäklin, 1852

= Acrotrichis insularis =

Species of beetle

Acrotrichis insularis is a species of feather-winged beetle.

== Distribution ==
In New Zealand, the species is exotic and present in the wild.
