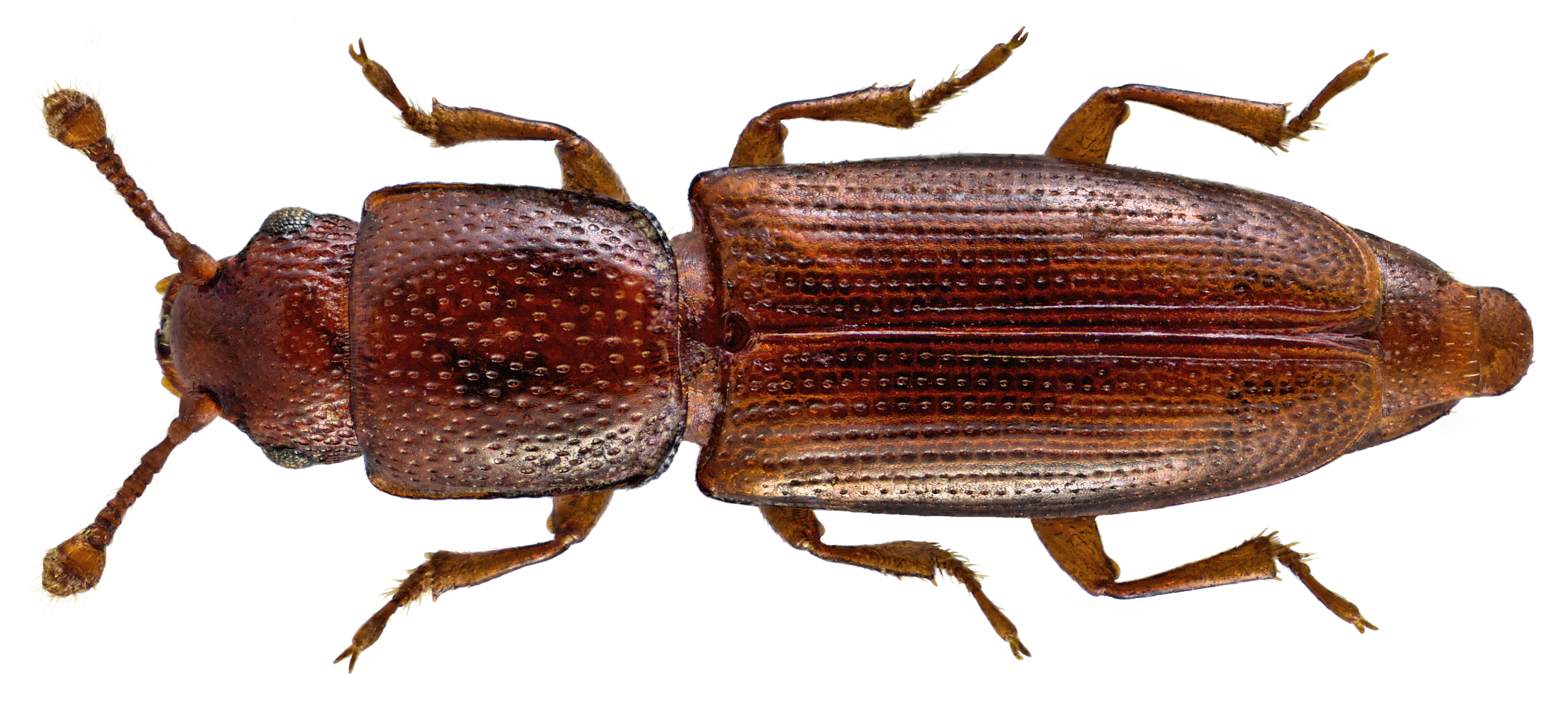

Scientific classification
- Kingdom: Animalia
- Phylum: Arthropoda
- Class: Insecta
- Order: Coleoptera
- Suborder: Polyphaga
- Infraorder: Cucujiformia
- Family: Monotomidae
- Genus: Rhizophagus
- Species: R. parallelocollis

Binomial name
- Rhizophagus parallelocollis Gyllenhal, 1827

= Rhizophagus parallelocollis =

Species of beetle

Rhizophagus parallelocollis, the graveyard beetle, is a species of root-eating beetle in the family Monotomidae. It is found in North America and Europe.
