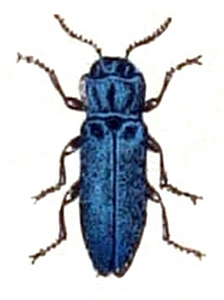

Scientific classification
- Domain: Eukaryota
- Kingdom: Animalia
- Phylum: Arthropoda
- Class: Insecta
- Order: Coleoptera
- Suborder: Polyphaga
- Infraorder: Elateriformia
- Family: Buprestidae
- Genus: Agrilus
- Species: A. sulcicollis

Binomial name
- Agrilus sulcicollis Lacordaire, 1835

= Agrilus sulcicollis =

Species of beetle

Agrilus sulcicollis, the European oak borer, is a species of metallic wood-boring beetle in the family Buprestidae. It is found in Europe and Northern Asia (excluding China) and North America.
