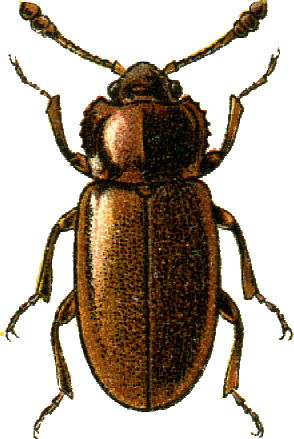

Scientific classification
- Kingdom: Animalia
- Phylum: Arthropoda
- Class: Insecta
- Order: Coleoptera
- Suborder: Polyphaga
- Infraorder: Cucujiformia
- Family: Cryptophagidae
- Genus: Henoticus
- Species: H. serratus

Binomial name
- Henoticus serratus (Gyllenhal, 1808)

= Henoticus serratus =

Species of beetle

Henoticus serratus is a species of silken fungus beetle in the family Cryptophagidae. It is found in Europe and Northern Asia (excluding China) and North America.
