= List of Atomaria species =

This is a list of 162 species in Atomaria, a genus of silken fungus beetles in the family Cryptophagidae.

== Atomaria species ==
- Atomaria abietina Reitter, 1887^{g}
- Atomaria affinis (F.Sahlberg, 1834)^{g}
- Atomaria aleutica Casey, 1900^{i c g}
- Atomaria alpina Heer, 1841^{g}
- Atomaria alternans (Wollaston, 1854)^{g}
- Atomaria analis Erichson, 1846^{g}
- Atomaria apicalis Erichson, 1846^{i c g b}
- Atomaria atra (Herbst, 1793)^{g}
- Atomaria atrata Reitter, 1875^{g b}
- Atomaria atricapilla Stephens, 1830^{g}
- Atomaria attila Reitter, 1878^{g}
- Atomaria badia Erichson, 1846^{g}
- Atomaria barani Brisout de Barneville, 1863^{g}
- Atomaria basalis Erichson, 1846^{g}
- Atomaria basicornis Reitter, 1888^{g}
- Atomaria bella Reitter, 1875^{g}
- Atomaria bescidica Reitter, 1887^{g}
- Atomaria bicolor Erichson, 1846^{g}
- Atomaria brevicollis Casey, 1900^{i c g}
- Atomaria bulbosa Wollaston, 1865^{g}
- Atomaria capitata (Casey, 1900)^{i c g}
- Atomaria carinula (Casey, 1900)^{i c g}
- Atomaria carpathica Reitter, 1875^{g}
- Atomaria caseyi Grouvelle, 1916^{i c g}
- Atomaria castanea (Casey, 1900)^{i c g}
- Atomaria clavigera Ganglbauer, 1899^{g}
- Atomaria coloradensis (Casey, 1900)^{i c g}
- Atomaria constricta (Casey, 1900)^{i c g}
- Atomaria crassula (Casey, 1900)^{i c g}
- Atomaria cribella Reitter, 1887^{g}
- Atomaria cribripennis (Casey, 1900)^{i c g}
- Atomaria crypta Casey, 1900^{i c g}
- Atomaria delicatula Tournier, 1872^{g}
- Atomaria deubeli Holdhaus, 1903^{g}
- Atomaria diluta Erichson, 1846^{i c g}
- Atomaria dispersa (Casey, 1900)^{i c g}
- Atomaria distincta Casey, 1900^{i c g b}
- Atomaria ebenina Casey, 1924^{i c g}
- Atomaria elongatula Erichson, 1846^{g}
- Atomaria ephippiata Zimmermann, 1869^{i c g b}
- Atomaria fallax Casey, 1900^{i c g}
- Atomaria fasciata Kolenati, 1846^{g}
- Atomaria fimetarii (Fabricius, 1792)^{g}
- Atomaria fimetarius (Fabricius, 1792)^{g}
- Atomaria forticornis (Casey, 1900)^{i c g}
- Atomaria fulvipennis Mannerheim, 1846^{i c g}
- Atomaria fuscata (Schönherr, 1808)^{i c g b}
- Atomaria fuscipes (Gyllenhal)^{g}
- Atomaria gibbula Erichson, 1846^{g}
- Atomaria gilvipennis Casey, 1900^{i c g}
- Atomaria godarti Guillebeau, 1885^{g}
- Atomaria gonodera Casey, 1900^{i c g}
- Atomaria gottwaldi Johnson, 1971^{g}
- Atomaria gracilicornis Reitter, 1887^{g}
- Atomaria grandicollis C.Brisout de Barneville, 1882^{g}
- Atomaria gravidula Erichson, 1846^{g}
- Atomaria grossepunctata Reitter, 1896^{g}
- Atomaria gutta Newman, 1834^{g}
- Atomaria hislopi Wollaston, 1857^{g}
- Atomaria ihsseni Johnson, 1978^{g}
- Atomaria impressa Erichson, 1846^{g b}
- Atomaria incerta Casey, 1900^{i c g}
- Atomaria inepta Casey, 1900^{i c g}
- Atomaria insecta Wollaston, 1857^{g}
- Atomaria jonica Reitter, 1888^{g}
- Atomaria kamtschatica Motschulsky, 1845^{i c g}
- Atomaria laetula LeConte, 1857^{i c g}
- Atomaria laevis Reitter, 1884^{g}
- Atomaria lapponica Johnson, 1978^{g}
- Atomaria laticollis Wollaston, 1865^{g}
- Atomaria lederi Johnson, 1970^{i c g b}
- Atomaria lepidula Mäklin, 1852^{i c g}
- Atomaria lewisi Reitter, 1877^{i c g b}
- Atomaria linearis Stephens, 1836^{i c g}
- Atomaria lineola (Notman, 1920)^{i c g}
- Atomaria lohsei Johnson & Strand, 1968^{g}
- Atomaria longicornis Thomson, 1863^{g}
- Atomaria longipennis (Casey, 1900)^{i c g}
- Atomaria lucens Grouvelle, 1916^{i c g}
- Atomaria luculenta (Casey, 1900)^{i c g}
- Atomaria lundbergi Johnson, 1978^{g}
- Atomaria macer (Casey, 1900)^{i c g}
- Atomaria marginicollis Reitter, 1887^{g}
- Atomaria melanica Hatch, 1962^{i c g}
- Atomaria melas (Casey, 1900)^{i c g}
- Atomaria mesomela Herbst, 1792^{g b}
- Atomaria mesomelas (Herbst, 1792)^{i c g}
- Atomaria mongolica Johnson, 1970^{g}
- Atomaria montenegrina Reitter, 1887^{g}
- Atomaria morio Kolenati, 1846^{g}
- Atomaria munda Erichson, 1846^{g}
- Atomaria nanula Casey, 1900^{i c g}
- Atomaria nebulosa Casey, 1924^{i c g}
- Atomaria nigricollis (Casey, 1900)^{i c g}
- Atomaria nigripennis (Kugelann, 1794)^{g}
- Atomaria nigrirostris Stephens, 1830^{i c g b}
- Atomaria nigriventris Stephens, 1830^{i c g}
- Atomaria nitidula (Marsham, 1802)^{g}
- Atomaria nubipennis Casey, 1900^{i c g}
- Atomaria obliqua Johnson, 1971^{g}
- Atomaria oblongula Casey, 1900^{i c g}
- Atomaria ochronitens (Casey, 1900)^{i c g}
- Atomaria ornata Heer, 1841^{g}
- Atomaria oromii Israelson, 1985^{g}
- Atomaria pallidipennis Holdhaus, 1903^{g}
- Atomaria palmi Johnson, 1975^{g}
- Atomaria parva Schenkling, 1923^{i c g}
- Atomaria parviceps Notman, 1921^{i c g}
- Atomaria parvula Reitter, 1875^{g}
- Atomaria patens (Casey, 1900)^{i c g}
- Atomaria peltata Kraatz, 1853^{g}
- Atomaria peltataeformis Sjöberg, 1947^{g}
- Atomaria planulata (Mäklin, 1853)^{i c g}
- Atomaria plicata Reitter, 1875^{g}
- Atomaria postpallens Casey, 1900^{i c g}
- Atomaria pseudaffinis Johnson & Strand, 1968^{g}
- Atomaria pseudatra Reitter, 1887^{g}
- Atomaria pseudoaffinis Johnson & Strand, 1968^{g}
- Atomaria pudica Johnson, 1971^{g}
- Atomaria puella (Casey, 1900)^{i c g}
- Atomaria pulchra Erichson, 1846^{i c g}
- Atomaria pumilio (Casey, 1900)^{i c g}
- Atomaria puncticollis Thomson, 1868^{g}
- Atomaria punctithorax Reitter, 1887^{g}
- Atomaria pusilla (Paykull, 1798)^{i c g}
- Atomaria quadricollis (Casey, 1900)^{i c g}
- Atomaria rhenanonum Kraatz, 1853^{g}
- Atomaria rhenonum Kraatz, 1853^{g}
- Atomaria riparia Casey, 1900^{i c g}
- Atomaria rubella Heer, 1841^{g}
- Atomaria rubida Reitter, 1875^{g}
- Atomaria rubricollis Brisout de Barneville, 1863^{g}
- Atomaria scutellaris Motschulsky, 1849^{g}
- Atomaria semitestacea Reitter, 1887^{g}
- Atomaria semusta Johnson, 1969^{g}
- Atomaria slavonica C.Johnson, 1971^{g}
- Atomaria sodermani Sjöberg, 1947^{g}
- Atomaria soedermani Sjoberg, 1947^{g}
- Atomaria soror Ganglbauer, 1899^{g}
- Atomaria sparreschneideri Munster, 1927^{g}
- Atomaria sparsula Reitter, 1887^{g}
- Atomaria sparsutula Reitter, 1887^{g}
- Atomaria strandi Johnson, 1967^{g}
- Atomaria stricticollis (Casey, 1900)^{i c g b}
- Atomaria subalutacea Casey, 1900^{i c g}
- Atomaria subangulata Sahlberg, 1926^{g b}
- Atomaria subdentata (Casey, 1900)^{i c g}
- Atomaria subnitens (Casey, 1900)^{i c g}
- Atomaria subrecta (Casey, 1900)^{i c g}
- Atomaria tenebrosa (Casey, 1900)^{i c g}
- Atomaria testacea Stephens, 1830^{i c g b}
- Atomaria torrida Johnson, 1971^{g}
- Atomaria turgida Erichson, 1846^{g}
- Atomaria umbrina (Gyllenhal, 1827)^{g}
- Atomaria undulata (Casey, 1900)^{i c g}
- Atomaria unifasciata Erichson, 1846^{g}
- Atomaria venusta Wollaston, 1865^{g}
- Atomaria versa Grouvelle, 1916^{i c g}
- Atomaria versicolor Erichson, 1846^{g}
- Atomaria vespertina Mäklin, 1853^{i c g b}
- Atomaria wollastoni Sharp, 1867^{i c g b}
- Atomaria zetterstedti (Zetterstedt, 1838)^{g}

Data sources: i = ITIS, c = Catalogue of Life, g = GBIF, b = Bugguide.net
