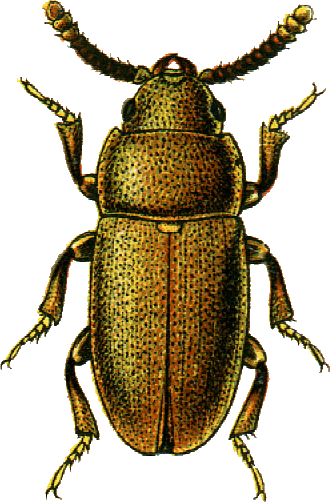
- Antherophagus silaceus

Scientific classification
- Kingdom: Animalia
- Phylum: Arthropoda
- Clade: Pancrustacea
- Class: Insecta
- Order: Coleoptera
- Suborder: Polyphaga
- Infraorder: Cucujiformia
- Family: Cryptophagidae
- Subfamily: Cryptophaginae; Kirby, 1826

= Cryptophaginae =

Subfamily of beetles

Cryptophaginae is a subfamily of silken fungus beetles in the family Cryptophagidae. There are about 11 genera and more than 180 described species in Cryptophaginae.

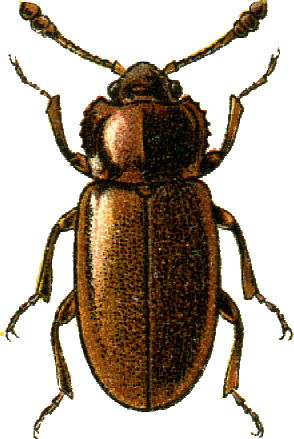
Henoticus serratus

== Genera ==
These 11 genera belong to the subfamily Cryptophaginae:

- Antherophagus Dejean, 1821
- Caenoscelis Thomson, 1863
- Cryptophagus Herbst, 1792
- Henoticus Thomson, 1868
- Henotiderus Reitter, 1877
- Myrmedophila Bousquet, 1989
- Pteryngium Reitter, 1887
- Renodesta Caterino, Leschen & Johnson, 2008
- Salebius Casey, 1900
- Sternodea Reitter, 1875
- Telmatophilus Heer, 1841
