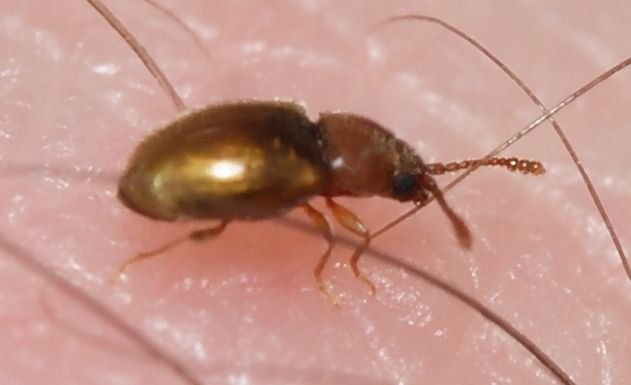
- Atomaria

Scientific classification
- Kingdom: Animalia
- Phylum: Arthropoda
- Class: Insecta
- Order: Coleoptera
- Suborder: Polyphaga
- Infraorder: Cucujiformia
- Family: Cryptophagidae
- Subfamily: Atomariinae; LeConte, 1861

= Atomariinae =

Subfamily of beetles

Atomariinae is a subfamily of silken fungus beetles in the family Cryptophagidae. There are about 8 genera and more than 170 described species in Atomariinae.

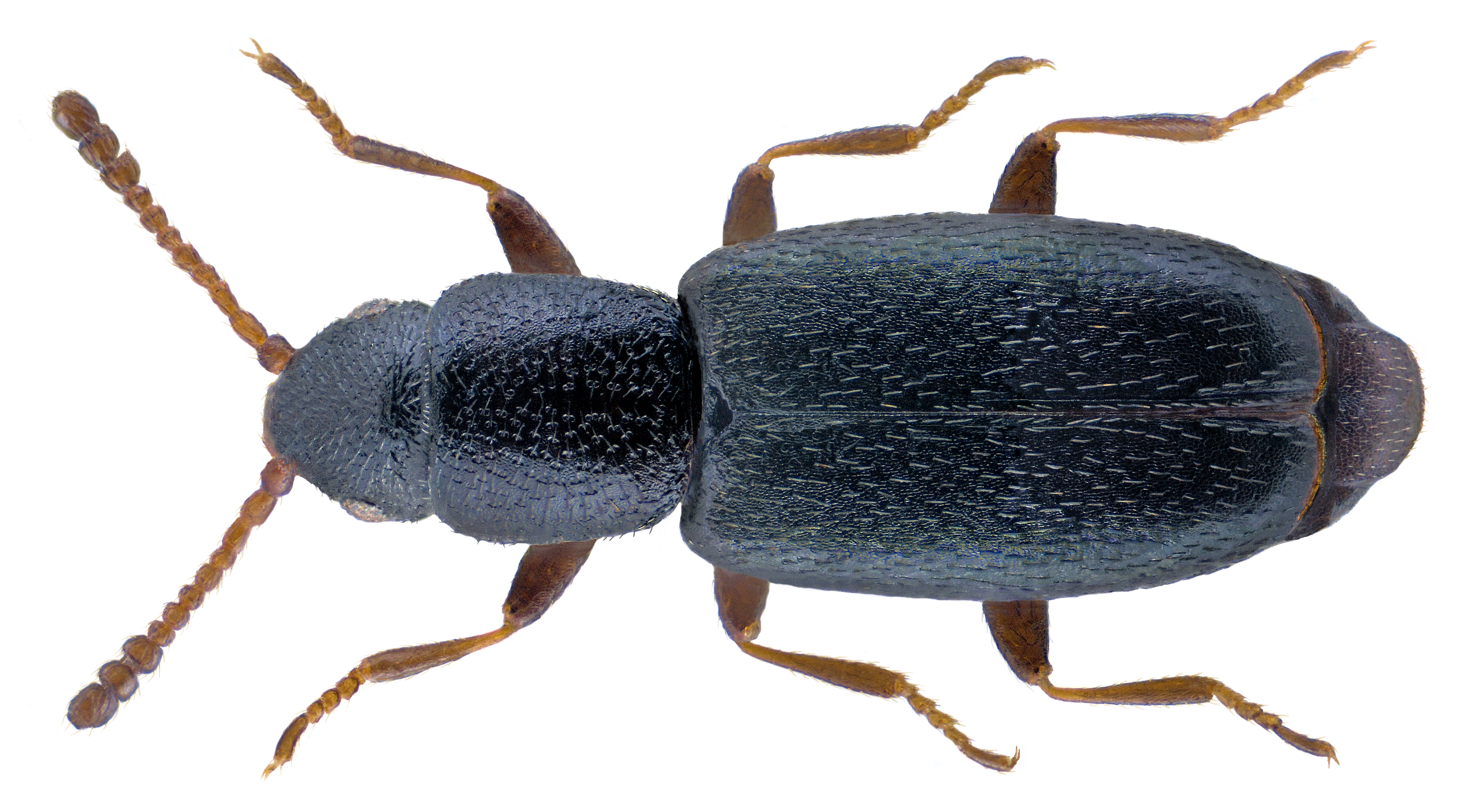
Hypocoprus

== Genera ==
These eight genera belong to the subfamily Atomariinae:

- Amydropa Reitter, 1877
- Atomaria Stephens, 1829
- Curelius Casey, 1900
- Ephistemus Stephens, 1829
- Hypocoprus Motschoulsky, 1839
- Hypophagus Lyubarsky, 1989
- Parephistemus Casey, 1924
- Tisactia Casey, 1900
