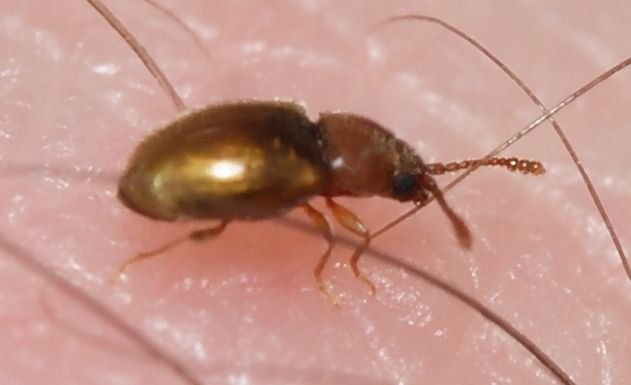
- Atomaria

Scientific classification
- Kingdom: Animalia
- Phylum: Arthropoda
- Class: Insecta
- Order: Coleoptera
- Suborder: Polyphaga
- Infraorder: Cucujiformia
- Family: Cryptophagidae
- Subfamily: Atomariinae
- Tribe: Atomariini; LeConte, 1861

= Atomariini =

Tribe of beetles

Atomariini is a tribe of silken fungus beetles in the family Cryptophagidae. There are about 5 genera and at least 70 described species in Atomariini.

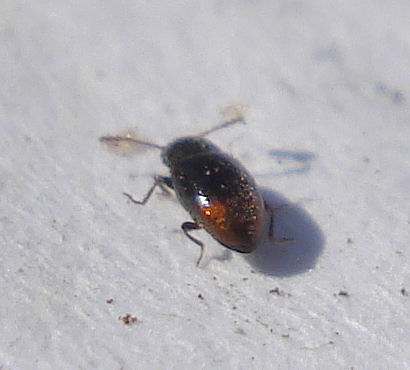
Atomaria

== Genera ==
These five genera belong to the tribe Atomariini:

- Atomaria Stephens, 1829^{i c g b}
- Curelius Casey, 1900^{i c g b}
- Ephistemus Stephens, 1829^{i c g b}
- Parephistemus Casey, 1924^{i c g}
- Tisactia Casey, 1900^{i c g b}

Data sources: i = ITIS, c = Catalogue of Life, g = GBIF, b = Bugguide.net
