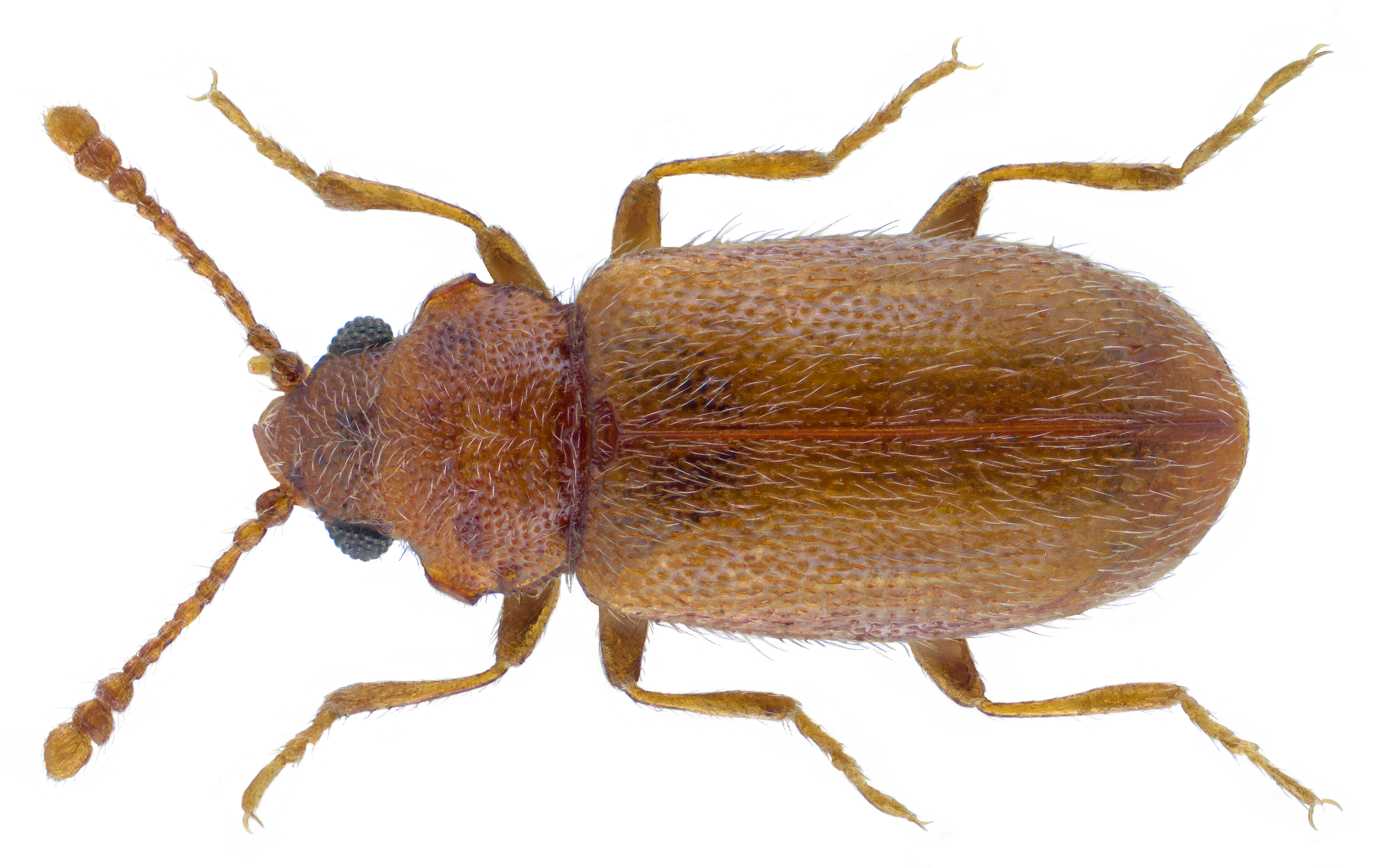
- Micrambe ulicis, United Kingdom

Scientific classification
- Kingdom: Animalia
- Phylum: Arthropoda
- Clade: Pancrustacea
- Class: Insecta
- Order: Coleoptera
- Suborder: Polyphaga
- Infraorder: Cucujiformia
- Family: Cryptophagidae
- Subfamily: Cryptophaginae
- Tribe: Cryptophagini
- Genus: Micrambe; Thomson, 1863

Diversity
- About 45+ species

= Micrambe =

Genus of beetles

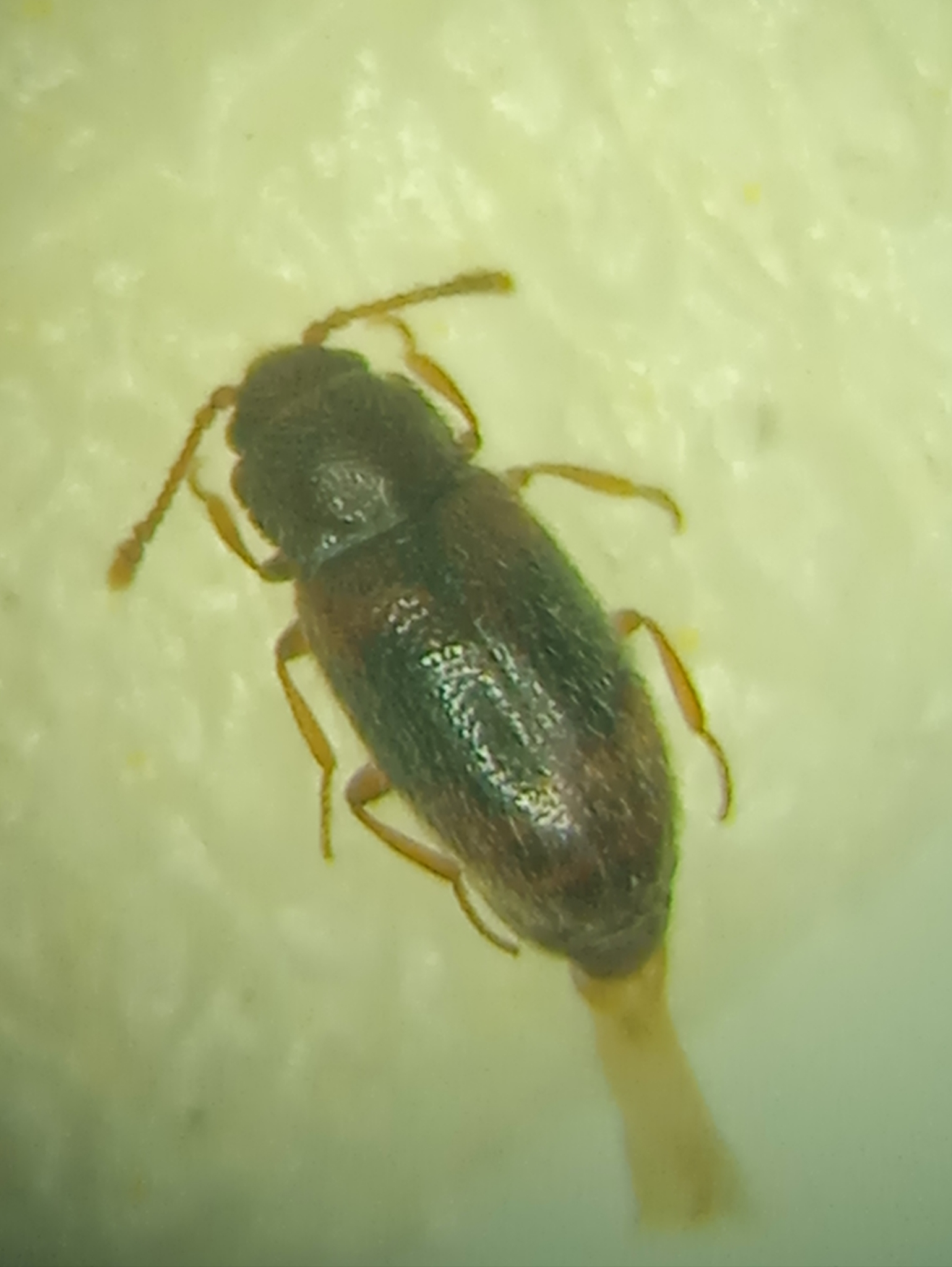
Micrambe bimaculata, Russia

Micrambe, is a genus of beetles belonging to the family Cryptophagidae. The genus contains more than 45 species. Six species are known from Madagascar and Réunion. About 23 species are known from South Africa.

== Species ==
- Micrambe abietis
- Micrambe africana
- Micrambe alluaudi
- Micrambe angulata
- Micrambe anguliformis
- Micrambe apicalis
- Micrambe basuto
- Micrambe brevitarsis
- Micrambe brincki
- Micrambe caffer
- Micrambe camerunensis
- Micrambe capensis
- Micrambe consors
- Micrambe danielssoni
- Micrambe endroedyi
- Micrambe grouvellei
- Micrambe hanstroemi
- Micrambe helichrysi
- Micrambe hirta
- Micrambe johnstoni
- Micrambe kolbei
- Micrambe leonardoi
- Micrambe loebli
- Micrambe madagascariensis
- Micrambe mediterranica
- Micrambe micoae
- Micrambe minuta
- Micrambe modesta
- Micrambe natalensis
- Micrambe nigrothoracica
- Micrambe oblonga
- Micrambe peringueyi
- Micrambe plagiata
- Micrambe quadricollis
- Micrambe reuninensis
- Micrambe similis
- Micrambe simoni
- Micrambe turneri
- Micrambe ulicis
- Micrambe woodroffei (= M.villosus)

In addition to the living species, a fossil member of the genus, M.sarnensis, has been described from Eocene remains.
