= Cryptophagus acutangulus =

Scientific classification
- Kingdom: Animalia
- Phylum: Arthropoda
- Clade: Pancrustacea
- Class: Insecta
- Order: Coleoptera
- Suborder: Polyphaga
- Infraorder: Cucujiformia
- Family: Cryptophagidae
- Genus: Cryptophagus
- Species: C. acutangulus

Binomial name
- Cryptophagus acutangulus (Gyllenhal, 1827)

Species of beetle

Cryptophagus acutangulus, the acute-angled fungus beetle is a species of silken fungus beetle native to Europe.
