= Odontacrossus esseri =

Scientific classification
- Kingdom: Animalia
- Phylum: Arthropoda
- Clade: Pancrustacea
- Class: Insecta
- Order: Coleoptera
- Suborder: Polyphaga
- Infraorder: Scarabaeiformia
- Family: Scarabaeidae
- Genus: Odontacrossus
- Species: O. esseri

Binomial name
- Odontacrossus esseri Bellmann, 2018

Species of beetle

Odontacrossus esseri is a species of beetle of the family Scarabaeidae. It is found in Myanmar and China (Yunnan).

== Description ==
Adults reach a length of about 6.8–7.3 mm (0.27–0.29 in). They have an elongate, convex body. The dorsal surface has weak microreticulation and is moderately shiny. The elytra have short setae apically and laterally. The body is entirely piceous-black, but the elytra have the apex rather broadly dark reddish-brown, and the pronotum is sometimes reddish brown laterally. The legs are piceous and the antennal club is black.

== Etymology ==
The species is dedicated to Jens Esser (Berlin, Germany), specialist of Cryptophagidae.
