= Atomaria distincta =

Scientific classification
- Kingdom: Animalia
- Phylum: Arthropoda
- Class: Insecta
- Order: Coleoptera
- Suborder: Polyphaga
- Infraorder: Cucujiformia
- Family: Cryptophagidae
- Genus: Atomaria
- Species: A. distincta

Binomial name
- Atomaria distincta Casey, 1900

Species of beetle

Atomaria distincta is a species of silken fungus beetle in the family Cryptophagidae. It is found in North America.
