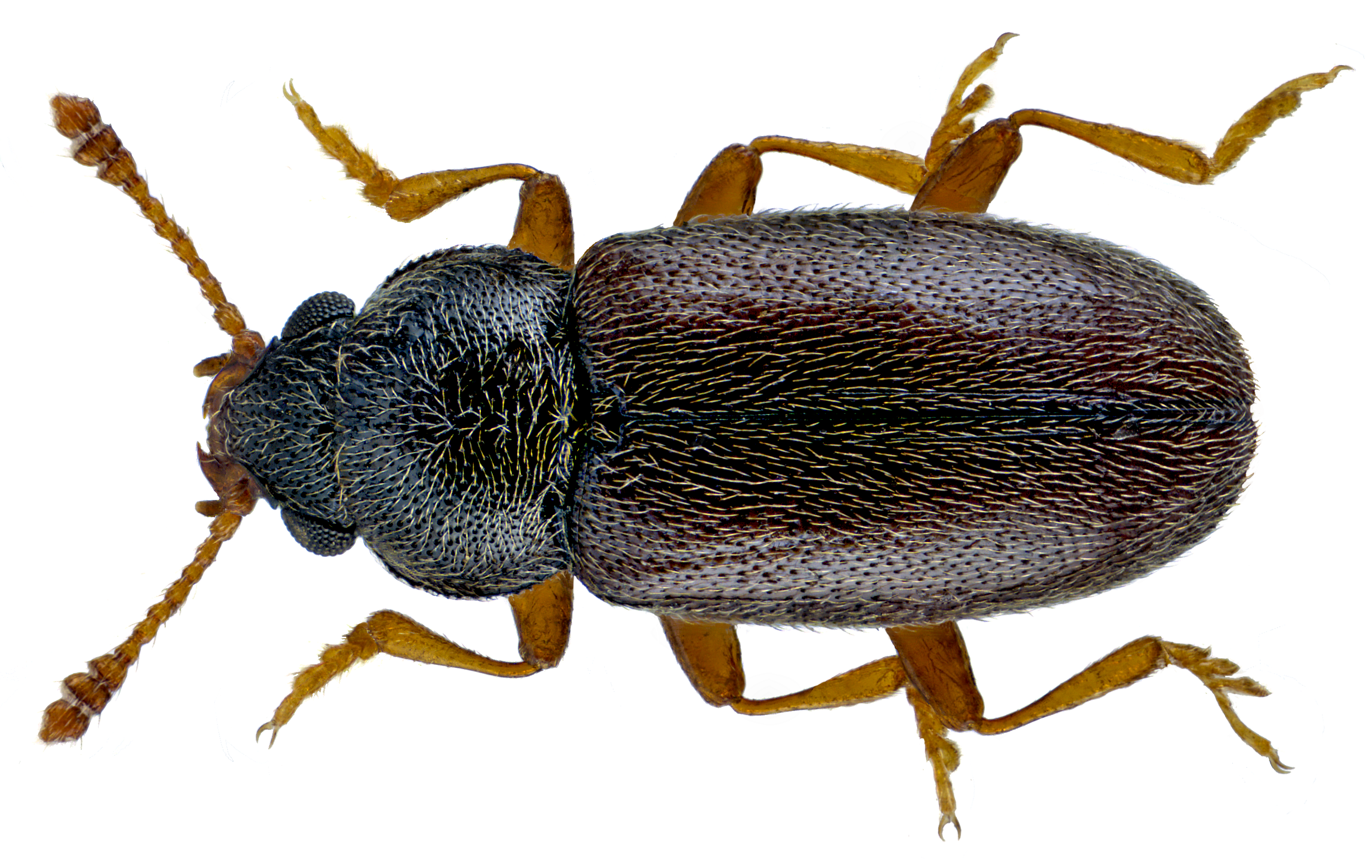
- Telmatophilus typhae 2,0 mm (1,5-2,6 mm)

Scientific classification
- Domain: Eukaryota
- Kingdom: Animalia
- Phylum: Arthropoda
- Class: Insecta
- Order: Coleoptera
- Suborder: Polyphaga
- Infraorder: Cucujiformia
- Family: Cryptophagidae
- Genus: Telmatophilus
- Species: T. typhae

Binomial name
- Telmatophilus typhae (Fallén, 1802)

= Telmatophilus typhae =

Species of beetle

Telmatophilus typhae is a species of silken fungus beetle native to Europe.
