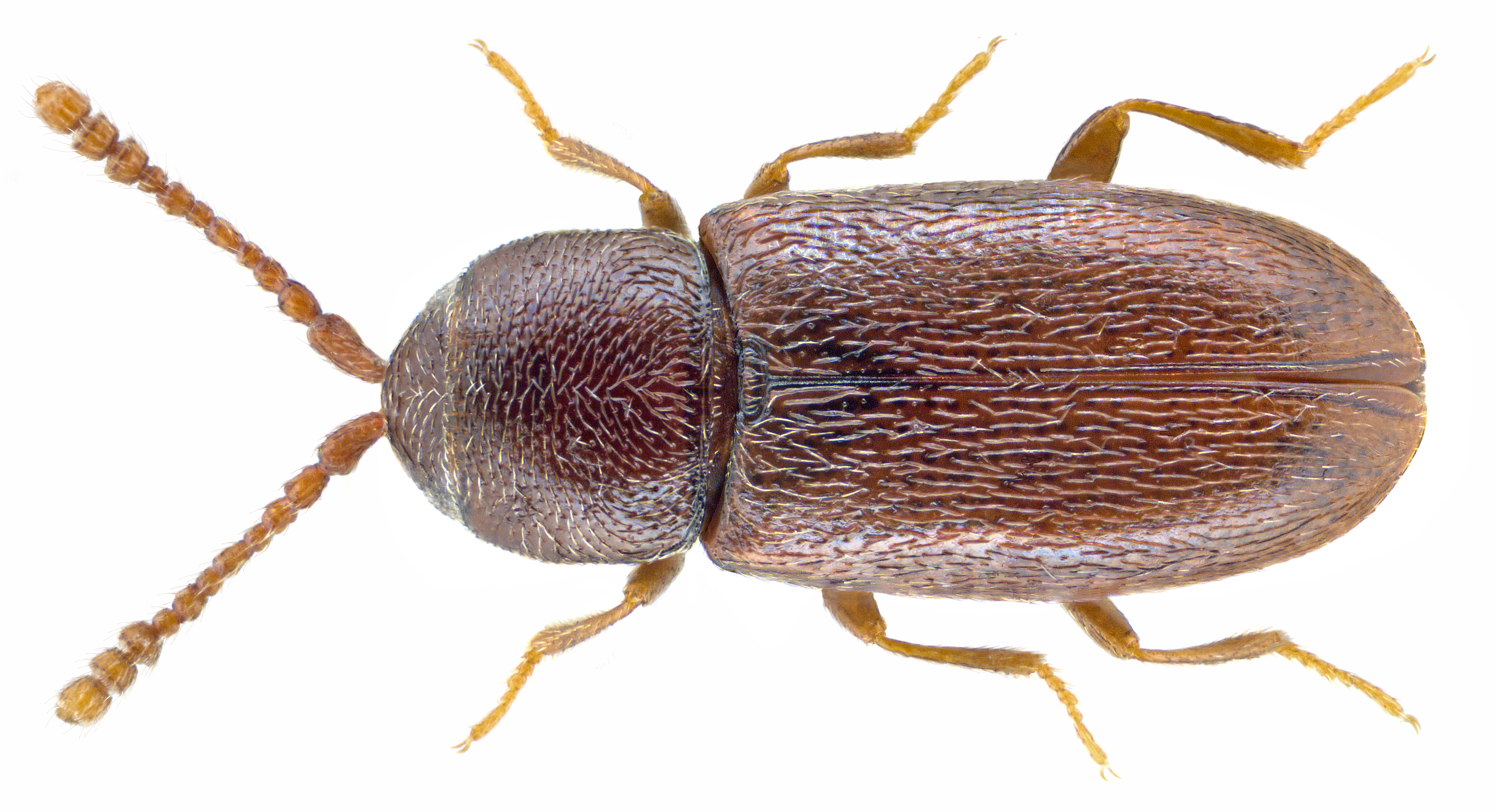

Scientific classification
- Domain: Eukaryota
- Kingdom: Animalia
- Phylum: Arthropoda
- Class: Insecta
- Order: Coleoptera
- Suborder: Polyphaga
- Infraorder: Cucujiformia
- Family: Cryptophagidae
- Genus: Atomaria
- Species: A. linearis

Binomial name
- Atomaria linearis Stephens, 1830

= Atomaria linearis =

Species of beetle

Atomaria linearis is a species of silken fungus beetle native to Europe. According to the European and Mediterranean Plant Protection Organization (EPPO), the common name of the species is pygmy mangold beetle.
