= Henotiderus centromaculatus =

Scientific classification
- Kingdom: Animalia
- Phylum: Arthropoda
- Class: Insecta
- Order: Coleoptera
- Suborder: Polyphaga
- Infraorder: Cucujiformia
- Family: Cryptophagidae
- Genus: Henotiderus
- Species: H. centromaculatus

Binomial name
- Henotiderus centromaculatus Reitter, 1877

Species of beetle

Henotiderus centromaculatus is a species of silken fungus beetle in the family Cryptophagidae. It is found in Europe and Northern Asia (excluding China), North America, and Southern Asia.
