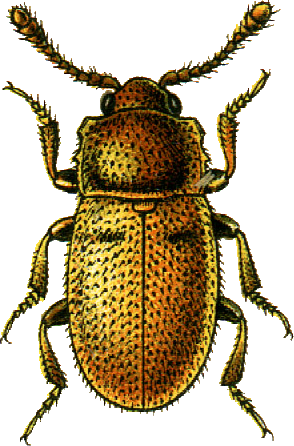

Scientific classification
- Domain: Eukaryota
- Kingdom: Animalia
- Phylum: Arthropoda
- Class: Insecta
- Order: Coleoptera
- Suborder: Polyphaga
- Infraorder: Cucujiformia
- Family: Cryptophagidae
- Genus: Cryptophagus
- Species: C. cellaris

Binomial name
- Cryptophagus cellaris (Scopoli, 1763)

Synonyms
- Cryptophagus angustatus Casey, 1924; Cryptophagus rupimontis Casey, 1924

= Cryptophagus cellaris =

Species of beetle

Cryptophagus cellaris, known generally as the cellar beetle or cellar fungus beetle, is a species of silken fungus beetle in the family Cryptophagidae. It is found in Europe and Northern Asia (excluding China) and North America.
