= Salebius octodentatus =

Scientific classification
- Domain: Eukaryota
- Kingdom: Animalia
- Phylum: Arthropoda
- Class: Insecta
- Order: Coleoptera
- Suborder: Polyphaga
- Infraorder: Cucujiformia
- Family: Cryptophagidae
- Genus: Salebius
- Species: S. octodentatus

Binomial name
- Salebius octodentatus (Mäklin, 1852)

Synonyms
- Salebius sexdentatus Casey, 1900; Salebius tarsalis Casey, 1900

Species of beetle

Salebius octodentatus is a species of silken fungus beetle in the family Cryptophagidae. It is found on the continent of North America.
