= Atomaria lederi =

Scientific classification
- Domain: Eukaryota
- Kingdom: Animalia
- Phylum: Arthropoda
- Class: Insecta
- Order: Coleoptera
- Suborder: Polyphaga
- Infraorder: Cucujiformia
- Family: Cryptophagidae
- Genus: Atomaria
- Species: A. lederi

Binomial name
- Atomaria lederi Johnson, 1970

Species of beetle

Atomaria lederi is a species of silken fungus beetle in the family Cryptophagidae. It is found in Europe and Northern Asia (excluding China), North America, and Southern Asia.
