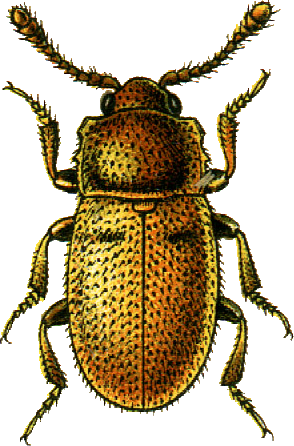
- Cryptophagus cellaris

Scientific classification
- Kingdom: Animalia
- Phylum: Arthropoda
- Clade: Pancrustacea
- Class: Insecta
- Order: Coleoptera
- Suborder: Polyphaga
- Infraorder: Cucujiformia
- Family: Cryptophagidae
- Subfamily: Cryptophaginae
- Tribe: Cryptophagini; Kirby, 1826

Synonyms
- Telmatophilini

= Cryptophagini =

Tribe of beetles

Cryptophagini is a tribe of silken fungus beetles in the family Cryptophagidae. There are about 8 genera and at least 60 described species in Cryptophagini.

Earlier authors often separated a group around Telmatophilus as tribe Telmatophilini, and sometimes included various more distantly related genera therein and/or allied them with the lizard beetles, but eventually the differences between Telmatophilus and Cryptophagus (such as "clubbed" vs "beaded" antennae) turned out to mislead about an actually close relationship and the tribes were merged.

== Genera ==
- Antherophagus Dejean, 1821
- Cryptophagus Herbst, 1792
- Henoticus Thomson, 1868
- Henotiderus Reitter, 1877
- Myrmedophila Bousquet, 1989
- Pteryngium Reitter, 1887
- Salebius Casey, 1900
- Telmatophilus Heer, 1841
