= Curelius japonicus =

Scientific classification
- Kingdom: Animalia
- Phylum: Arthropoda
- Class: Insecta
- Order: Coleoptera
- Suborder: Polyphaga
- Infraorder: Cucujiformia
- Family: Cryptophagidae
- Genus: Curelius
- Species: C. japonicus

Binomial name
- Curelius japonicus (Reitter, 1877)

Species of beetle

Curelius japonicus is a species of silken fungus beetle in the family Cryptophagidae. It is found in North America.
