= Atomaria ephippiata =

Scientific classification
- Domain: Eukaryota
- Kingdom: Animalia
- Phylum: Arthropoda
- Class: Insecta
- Order: Coleoptera
- Suborder: Polyphaga
- Infraorder: Cucujiformia
- Family: Cryptophagidae
- Genus: Atomaria
- Species: A. ephippiata

Binomial name
- Atomaria ephippiata Zimmermann, 1869

Synonyms
- Atomaria ephippiata hesperica Casey, 1900

Species of beetle

Atomaria ephippiata is a species of silken fungus beetle in the family Cryptophagidae. It is found in North America.
