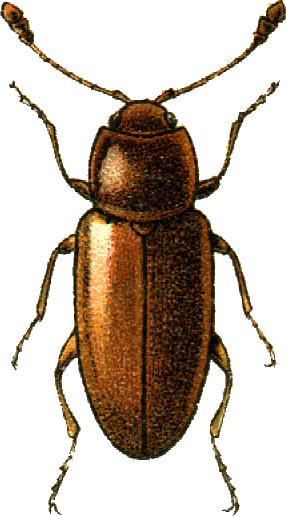

Scientific classification
- Domain: Eukaryota
- Kingdom: Animalia
- Phylum: Arthropoda
- Class: Insecta
- Order: Coleoptera
- Suborder: Polyphaga
- Infraorder: Cucujiformia
- Family: Cryptophagidae
- Genus: Caenoscelis
- Species: C. ferruginea

Binomial name
- Caenoscelis ferruginea (Sahlberg, 1820)

Synonyms
- Caenoscelis testacea Zimmermann, 1869

= Caenoscelis ferruginea =

Species of beetle

Caenoscelis ferruginea is a species of silken fungus beetle in the family Cryptophagidae. It is found in Europe and Northern Asia (excluding China) and North America.
