= Cryptophagus stromus =

Scientific classification
- Domain: Eukaryota
- Kingdom: Animalia
- Phylum: Arthropoda
- Class: Insecta
- Order: Coleoptera
- Suborder: Polyphaga
- Infraorder: Cucujiformia
- Family: Cryptophagidae
- Genus: Cryptophagus
- Species: C. stromus

Binomial name
- Cryptophagus stromus Woodroffe & Coombs, 1961

Species of beetle

Cryptophagus stromus is a species of silken fungus beetle in the family Cryptophagidae. It is found in North America.
