= Cryptophagus difficilis =

Scientific classification
- Kingdom: Animalia
- Phylum: Arthropoda
- Class: Insecta
- Order: Coleoptera
- Suborder: Polyphaga
- Infraorder: Cucujiformia
- Family: Cryptophagidae
- Genus: Cryptophagus
- Species: C. difficilis

Binomial name
- Cryptophagus difficilis Casey, 1900

Synonyms
- Cryptophagus contractus Casey, 1924

Species of beetle

Cryptophagus difficilis is a species of silken fungus beetle in the family Cryptophagidae. It is found in North America.
