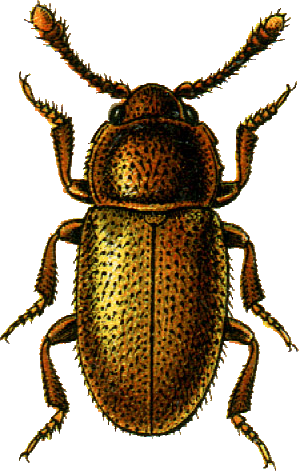

Scientific classification
- Domain: Eukaryota
- Kingdom: Animalia
- Phylum: Arthropoda
- Class: Insecta
- Order: Coleoptera
- Suborder: Polyphaga
- Infraorder: Cucujiformia
- Family: Cryptophagidae
- Genus: Cryptophagus
- Species: C. saginatus

Binomial name
- Cryptophagus saginatus Sturm, 1845

= Cryptophagus saginatus =

Species of beetle

Cryptophagus saginatus is a species of silken fungus beetle in the family Cryptophagidae. It is found in North America and Europe.
