= Atomaria stricticollis =

Scientific classification
- Kingdom: Animalia
- Phylum: Arthropoda
- Class: Insecta
- Order: Coleoptera
- Suborder: Polyphaga
- Infraorder: Cucujiformia
- Family: Cryptophagidae
- Genus: Atomaria
- Species: A. stricticollis

Binomial name
- Atomaria stricticollis (Casey, 1900)

Synonyms
- Agathengis stricticollis Casey, 1900

Species of beetle

Atomaria stricticollis is a species of silken fungus beetle in the family Cryptophagidae. It is found in North America.
