= Cryptophagus lapponicus =

Scientific classification
- Kingdom: Animalia
- Phylum: Arthropoda
- Class: Insecta
- Order: Coleoptera
- Suborder: Polyphaga
- Infraorder: Cucujiformia
- Family: Cryptophagidae
- Genus: Cryptophagus
- Species: C. lapponicus

Binomial name
- Cryptophagus lapponicus Gyllenhal, 1828

Species of beetle

Cryptophagus lapponicus is a species of silken fungus beetle in the family Cryptophagidae. It is found in Europe and Northern Asia (excluding China) and North America.
