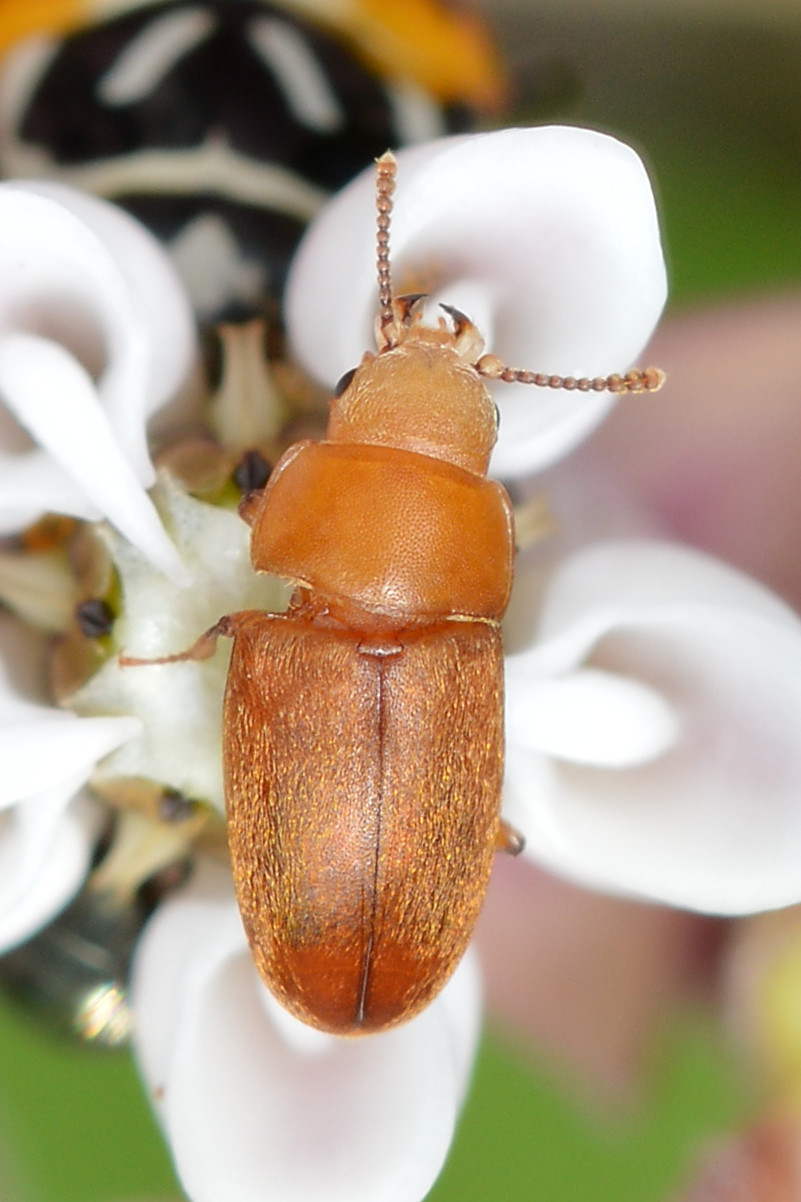

Scientific classification
- Domain: Eukaryota
- Kingdom: Animalia
- Phylum: Arthropoda
- Class: Insecta
- Order: Coleoptera
- Suborder: Polyphaga
- Infraorder: Cucujiformia
- Family: Cryptophagidae
- Genus: Antherophagus
- Species: A. ochraceus

Binomial name
- Antherophagus ochraceus Melsheimer, 1844

Synonyms
- Antherophagus oregonus Casey, 1924

= Antherophagus ochraceus =

Species of beetle

Antherophagus ochraceus is a species of silken fungus beetle in the family Cryptophagidae. It is found in North America.

A. ochraceus is one of the largest cryptophagid species. Adults measure 4-5 mm in length. It can be distinguished from similar species by its larger size, entirely yellow body, golden pubescence, small eyes, and smooth, curved pronotum.

The adult beetles are found on flowers, where they eat pollen and nectar and interact with bumblebees. They can be found from May to September. A. ochraceus, along with some other members of Cryptophagidae, engage in phoresy. The beetles are transported by attaching to the legs, mouthparts, or antennae of bumblebees. It remains attached by clamping down with its mandibles. It does not release until the bee returns to its nest. A. ochraceus adults lay eggs in bumblebee nests, where the eggs develop into larvae. In the larval stage, the beetles remain in the nest and eat organic matter and detritus. Specifically, they are presumed to consume honey, bee feces, and comb debris.
