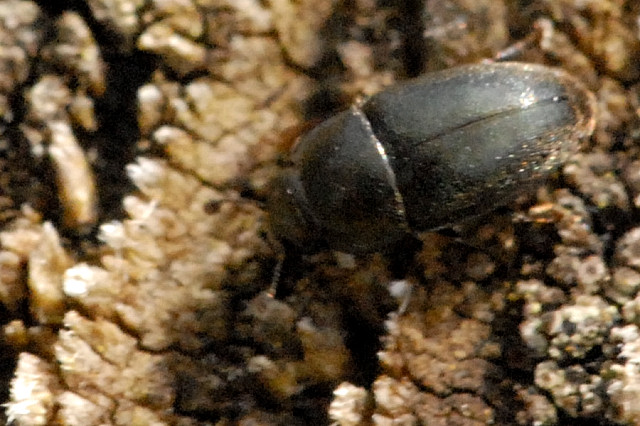

Scientific classification
- Domain: Eukaryota
- Kingdom: Animalia
- Phylum: Arthropoda
- Class: Insecta
- Order: Coleoptera
- Suborder: Polyphaga
- Infraorder: Cucujiformia
- Family: Cryptophagidae
- Genus: Cryptophagus
- Species: C. corticinus

Binomial name
- Cryptophagus corticinus Thomson, 1863

Synonyms
- Cryptophagus depressulus Casey, 1900

= Cryptophagus corticinus =

Species of beetle

Cryptophagus corticinus is a species of silken fungus beetle in the family Cryptophagidae. It is found in North America and Europe.
