= Atomaria wollastoni =

Scientific classification
- Kingdom: Animalia
- Phylum: Arthropoda
- Class: Insecta
- Order: Coleoptera
- Suborder: Polyphaga
- Infraorder: Cucujiformia
- Family: Cryptophagidae
- Genus: Atomaria
- Species: A. wollastoni

Binomial name
- Atomaria wollastoni Sharp, 1867

Species of beetle

Atomaria wollastoni is a species of silken fungus beetle in the family Cryptophagidae. It is found in Europe and Northern Asia (excluding China) and North America.
