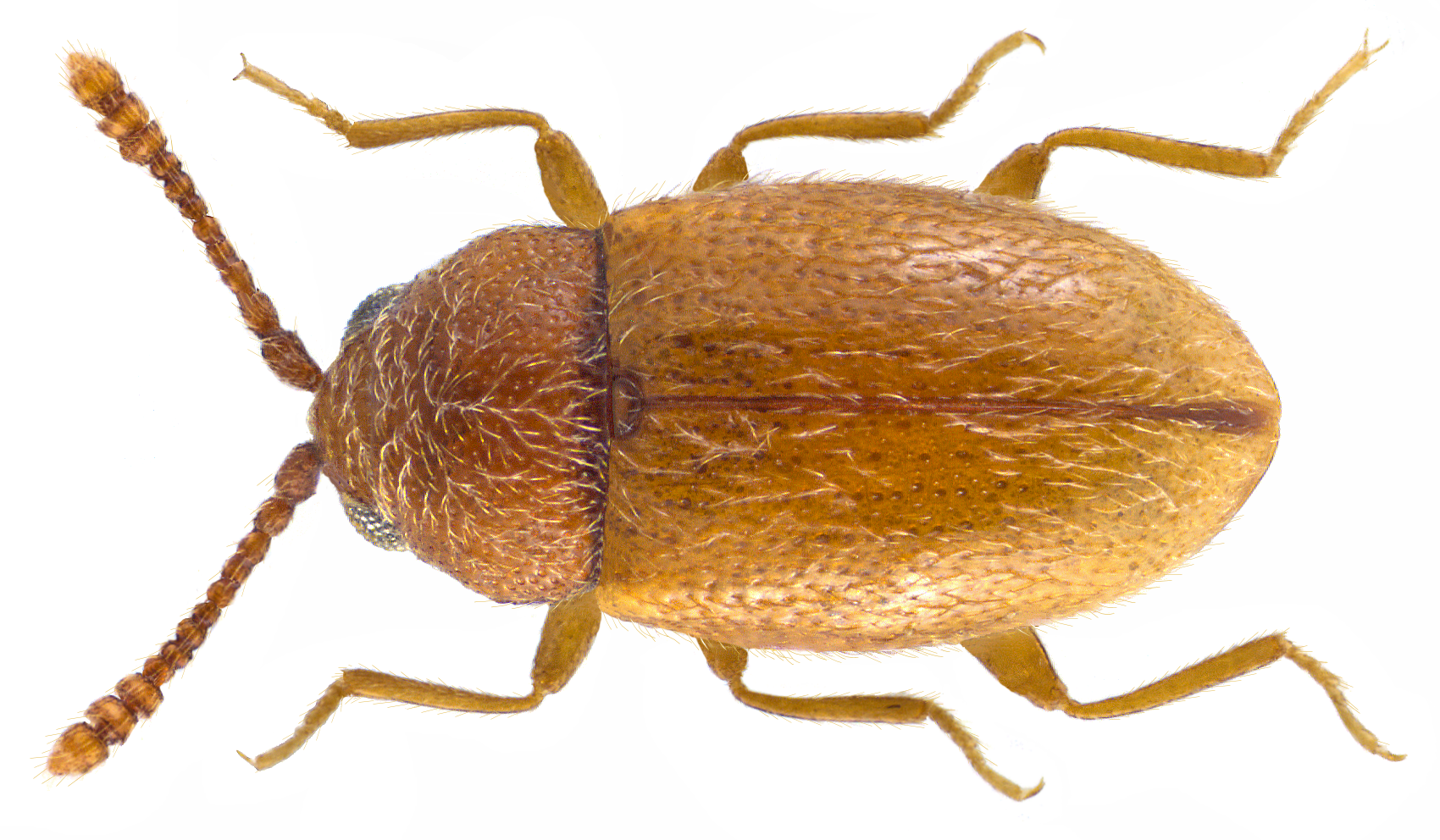
- Atomaria lewisi (1,4-2,0 mm)

Scientific classification
- Kingdom: Animalia
- Phylum: Arthropoda
- Class: Insecta
- Order: Coleoptera
- Suborder: Polyphaga
- Infraorder: Cucujiformia
- Family: Cryptophagidae
- Genus: Atomaria
- Species: A. lewisi

Binomial name
- Atomaria lewisi Reitter, 1877

= Atomaria lewisi =

Species of beetle

Atomaria lewisi is a species of silken fungus beetle native to Europe.
