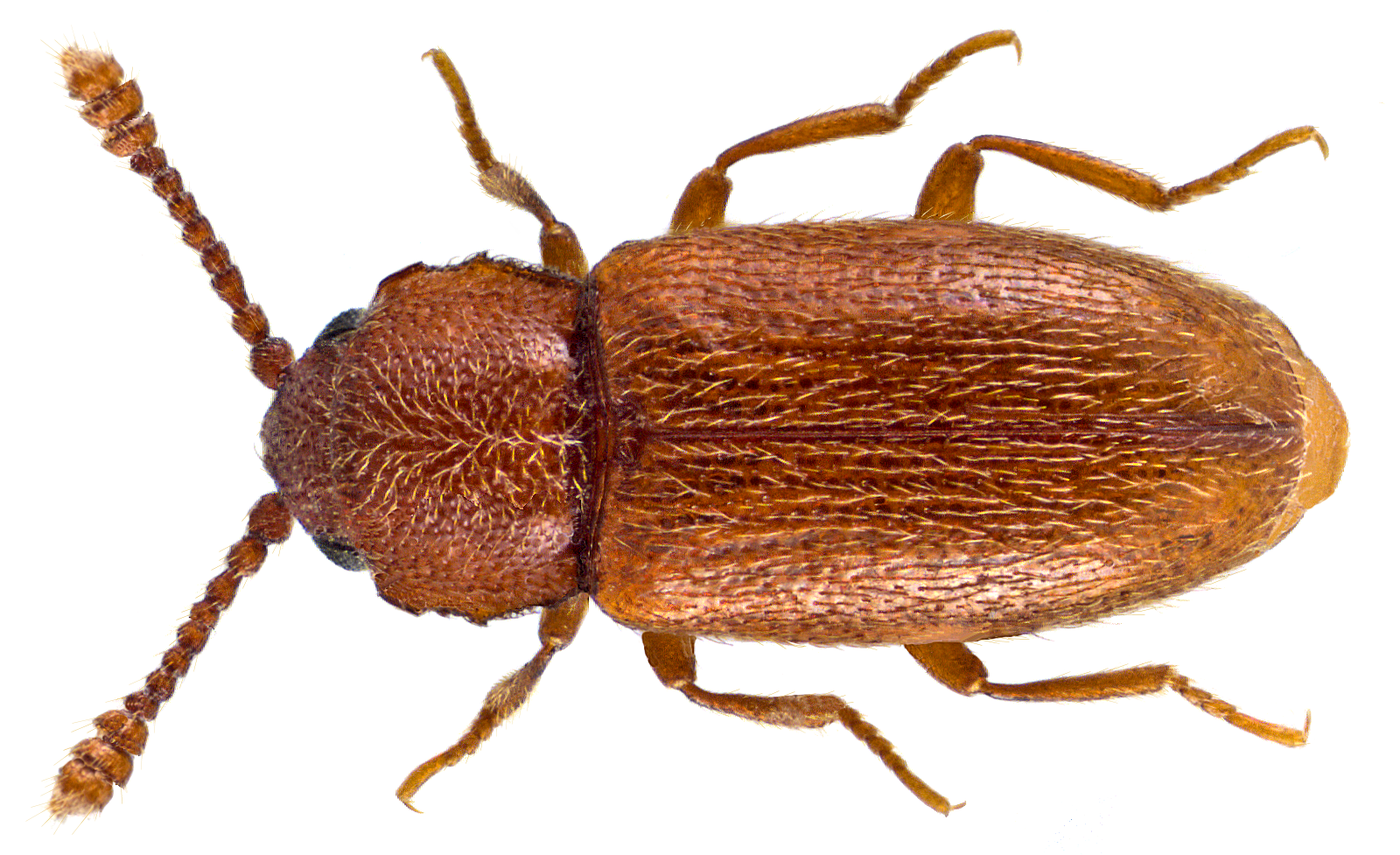

Scientific classification
- Kingdom: Animalia
- Phylum: Arthropoda
- Class: Insecta
- Order: Coleoptera
- Suborder: Polyphaga
- Infraorder: Cucujiformia
- Family: Cryptophagidae
- Genus: Cryptophagus
- Species: C. dentatus

Binomial name
- Cryptophagus dentatus (Herbst, 1793)

Synonyms
- Cryptophagus quadridentatus Mannerheim, 1843

= Cryptophagus dentatus =

Species of beetle

Cryptophagus dentatus is a species of silken fungus beetle in the family Cryptophagidae. It is found in Europe and Northern Asia (excluding China) and North America.
