= Atomaria nigrirostris =

Scientific classification
- Kingdom: Animalia
- Phylum: Arthropoda
- Clade: Pancrustacea
- Class: Insecta
- Order: Coleoptera
- Suborder: Polyphaga
- Infraorder: Cucujiformia
- Family: Cryptophagidae
- Genus: Atomaria
- Species: A. nigrirostris

Binomial name
- Atomaria nigrirostris Stephens, 1830

Synonyms
- Atomaria fuscicollis Mannerheim, 1852

Species of beetle

Atomaria nigrirostris is a species of silken fungus beetle in the family Cryptophagidae. It is found in Africa, Europe and Northern Asia (excluding China), and North America.
