= Cryptophagus valens =

Scientific classification
- Kingdom: Animalia
- Phylum: Arthropoda
- Clade: Pancrustacea
- Class: Insecta
- Order: Coleoptera
- Suborder: Polyphaga
- Infraorder: Cucujiformia
- Family: Cryptophagidae
- Genus: Cryptophagus
- Species: C. valens

Binomial name
- Cryptophagus valens Casey, 1900

Species of beetle

Cryptophagus valens is a species of silken fungus beetle in the family Cryptophagidae. It is found in North America.

== Subspecies ==
These two subspecies belong to the species Cryptophagus valens:

- Cryptophagus valens cyaneoisignata Casey
- Cryptophagus valens valens
