= Telmatophilus americanus =

Scientific classification
- Domain: Eukaryota
- Kingdom: Animalia
- Phylum: Arthropoda
- Class: Insecta
- Order: Coleoptera
- Suborder: Polyphaga
- Infraorder: Cucujiformia
- Family: Cryptophagidae
- Genus: Telmatophilus
- Species: T. americanus

Binomial name
- Telmatophilus americanus (LeConte, 1863)

Species of beetle

Telmatophilus americanus is a species of silken fungus beetle in the family Cryptophagidae.
