= Henotiderus lorna =

Scientific classification
- Domain: Eukaryota
- Kingdom: Animalia
- Phylum: Arthropoda
- Class: Insecta
- Order: Coleoptera
- Suborder: Polyphaga
- Infraorder: Cucujiformia
- Family: Cryptophagidae
- Genus: Henotiderus
- Species: H. lorna

Binomial name
- Henotiderus lorna (Hatch, 1962)

Species of beetle

Henotiderus lorna is a species of silken fungus beetle in the family Cryptophagidae. It is found in North America.
