= Cryptophagus bidentatus =

Scientific classification
- Domain: Eukaryota
- Kingdom: Animalia
- Phylum: Arthropoda
- Class: Insecta
- Order: Coleoptera
- Suborder: Polyphaga
- Infraorder: Cucujiformia
- Family: Cryptophagidae
- Genus: Cryptophagus
- Species: C. bidentatus

Binomial name
- Cryptophagus bidentatus Mäklin, 1853

Synonyms
- Cryptophagus punctatissimus Mäklin, 1853

Species of beetle

Cryptophagus bidentatus is a species of silken fungus beetle in the family Cryptophagidae. It is found in North America.
