= Atomaria fuscata =

Scientific classification
- Domain: Eukaryota
- Kingdom: Animalia
- Phylum: Arthropoda
- Class: Insecta
- Order: Coleoptera
- Suborder: Polyphaga
- Infraorder: Cucujiformia
- Family: Cryptophagidae
- Genus: Atomaria
- Species: A. fuscata

Binomial name
- Atomaria fuscata (Schönherr, 1808)

Synonyms
- Anchicera ochracea (Zimmermann, 1869); Anchicera pennsylvanica (Casey, 1900); Anchicera saginata (Casey, 1900); Atomaria ochracea Zimmermann, 1869; Atomaria ochracea lacustris Casey, 1900; Atomaria ochracea pennsylvanica Casey, 1900; Atomaria saginata Casey, 1900

Species of beetle

Atomaria fuscata is a species of silken fungus beetle in the family Cryptophagidae. It is found in Europe and Northern Asia (excluding China), North America, and Southern Asia.
