= Cryptophagus scanicus =

Scientific classification
- Kingdom: Animalia
- Phylum: Arthropoda
- Class: Insecta
- Order: Coleoptera
- Suborder: Polyphaga
- Infraorder: Cucujiformia
- Family: Cryptophagidae
- Genus: Cryptophagus
- Species: C. scanicus

Binomial name
- Cryptophagus scanicus (Linnaeus, 1758)

Species of beetle

Cryptophagus scanicus is a species of silken fungus beetle native to Europe.
