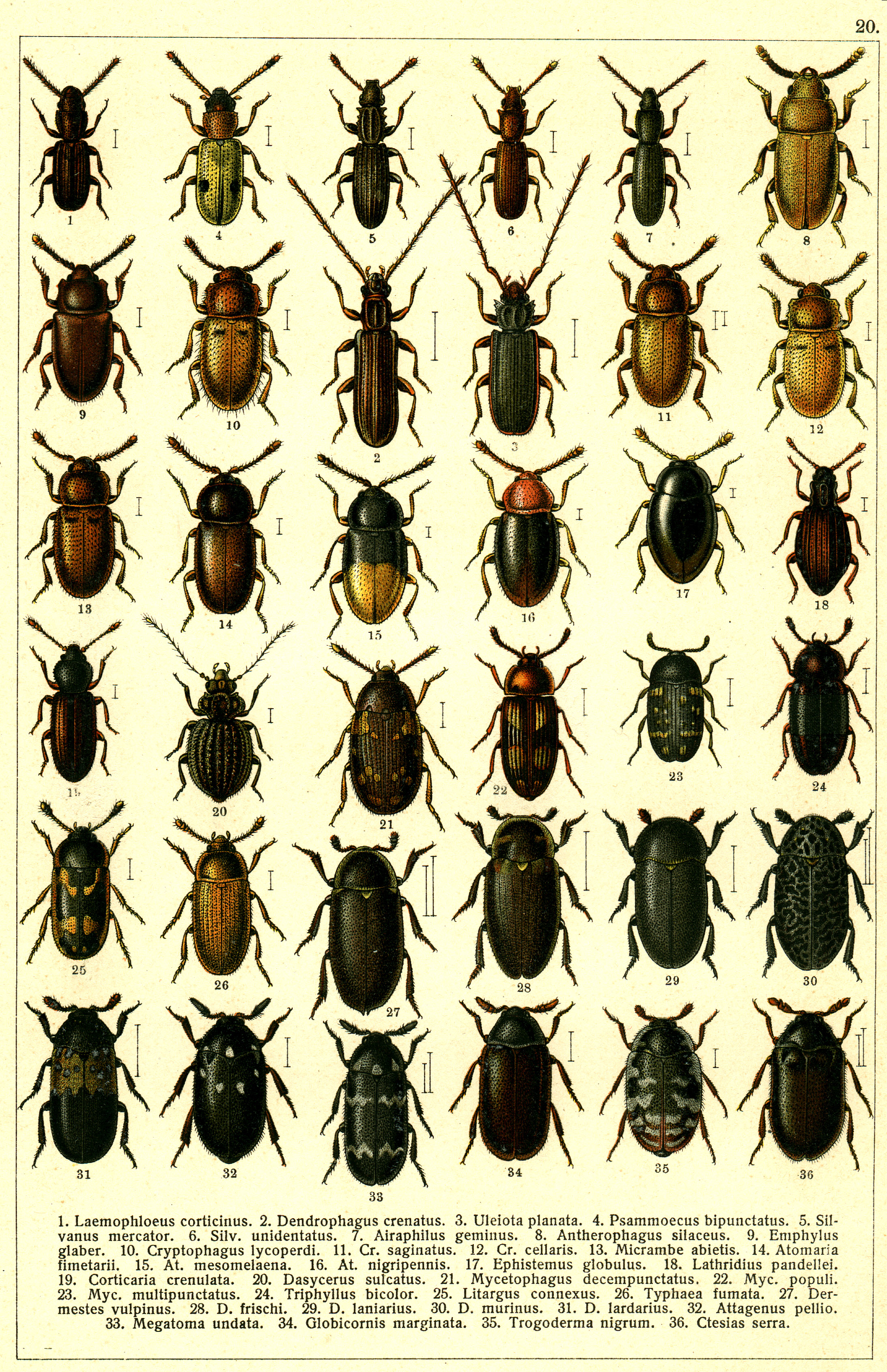

Scientific classification
- Kingdom: Animalia
- Phylum: Arthropoda
- Clade: Pancrustacea
- Class: Insecta
- Order: Coleoptera
- Suborder: Polyphaga
- Infraorder: Cucujiformia
- Family: Cryptophagidae
- Genus: Atomaria
- Species: A. fimetarii

Binomial name
- Atomaria fimetarii (Fabricius, 1792)

= Atomaria fimetarii =

Species of beetle

Atomaria fimetarii is a species of silken fungus beetle native to Europe.
