= Atomaria fuscipes =

Scientific classification
- Domain: Eukaryota
- Kingdom: Animalia
- Phylum: Arthropoda
- Class: Insecta
- Order: Coleoptera
- Suborder: Polyphaga
- Infraorder: Cucujiformia
- Family: Cryptophagidae
- Genus: Atomaria
- Species: A. fuscipes

Binomial name
- Atomaria fuscipes (Gyllenhal, 1808)

Species of beetle

Atomaria fuscipes is a species of silken fungus beetle native to Europe.
