= Atomaria apicalis =

Scientific classification
- Kingdom: Animalia
- Phylum: Arthropoda
- Class: Insecta
- Order: Coleoptera
- Suborder: Polyphaga
- Infraorder: Cucujiformia
- Family: Cryptophagidae
- Genus: Atomaria
- Species: A. apicalis

Binomial name
- Atomaria apicalis Erichson, 1846

Synonyms
- Anchicera ovalis (Casey, 1900); Atomaria ovalis Casey, 1900

Species of beetle

Atomaria apicalis is a species of silken fungus beetle in the family Cryptophagidae. It is found in Europe and Northern Asia (excluding China) and North America.
