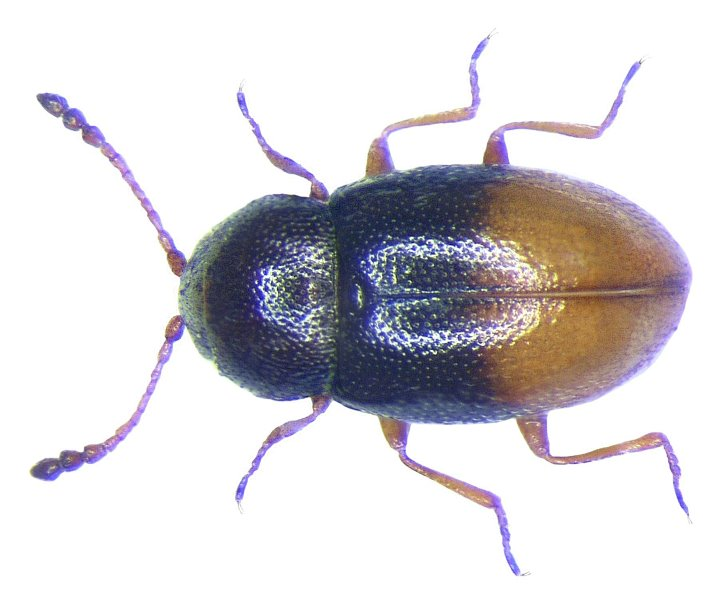
- Atomaria mesomela 1,3-1,7 mm.

Scientific classification
- Kingdom: Animalia
- Phylum: Arthropoda
- Class: Insecta
- Order: Coleoptera
- Suborder: Polyphaga
- Infraorder: Cucujiformia
- Family: Cryptophagidae
- Genus: Atomaria
- Species: A. mesomela

Binomial name
- Atomaria mesomela (Herbst, 1793)

= Atomaria mesomela =

Species of beetle

Atomaria mesomela is a species of silken fungus beetle native to Europe.
