= Renodesta ramsdalei =

Scientific classification
- Kingdom: Animalia
- Phylum: Arthropoda
- Class: Insecta
- Order: Coleoptera
- Suborder: Polyphaga
- Infraorder: Cucujiformia
- Family: Cryptophagidae
- Genus: Renodesta
- Species: R. ramsdalei

Binomial name
- Renodesta ramsdalei Caterino, Leschen & Johnson, 2008

Species of beetle

Renodesta ramsdalei is a species of silken fungus beetle in the family Cryptophagidae. It is found in North America.
