= Cryptophagus laticollis =

Scientific classification
- Domain: Eukaryota
- Kingdom: Animalia
- Phylum: Arthropoda
- Class: Insecta
- Order: Coleoptera
- Suborder: Polyphaga
- Infraorder: Cucujiformia
- Family: Cryptophagidae
- Genus: Cryptophagus
- Species: C. laticollis

Binomial name
- Cryptophagus laticollis H. Lucas, 1849

Synonyms
- Cryptophagus cribricollis Casey, 1900; Cryptophagus inscitus Casey, 1900

Species of beetle

Cryptophagus laticollis is a silken fungus beetle in the family Cryptophagidae. The species was first described by Hippolyte Lucas in 1849. It is found in Europe, northern Asia (excluding China) and North America.
