= Caenoscelis basalis =

Scientific classification
- Kingdom: Animalia
- Phylum: Arthropoda
- Class: Insecta
- Order: Coleoptera
- Suborder: Polyphaga
- Infraorder: Cucujiformia
- Family: Cryptophagidae
- Genus: Caenoscelis
- Species: C. basalis

Binomial name
- Caenoscelis basalis Casey, 1900

Species of beetle

Caenoscelis basalis is a species of silken fungus beetle in the family Cryptophagidae. It is found in North America.
