= Cryptophagus discedens =

Scientific classification
- Kingdom: Animalia
- Phylum: Arthropoda
- Class: Insecta
- Order: Coleoptera
- Suborder: Polyphaga
- Infraorder: Cucujiformia
- Family: Cryptophagidae
- Genus: Cryptophagus
- Species: C. discedens

Binomial name
- Cryptophagus discedens Casey, 1900

Species of beetle

Cryptophagus discedens is a species of silken fungus beetle in the family Cryptophagidae. It is found in North America.
