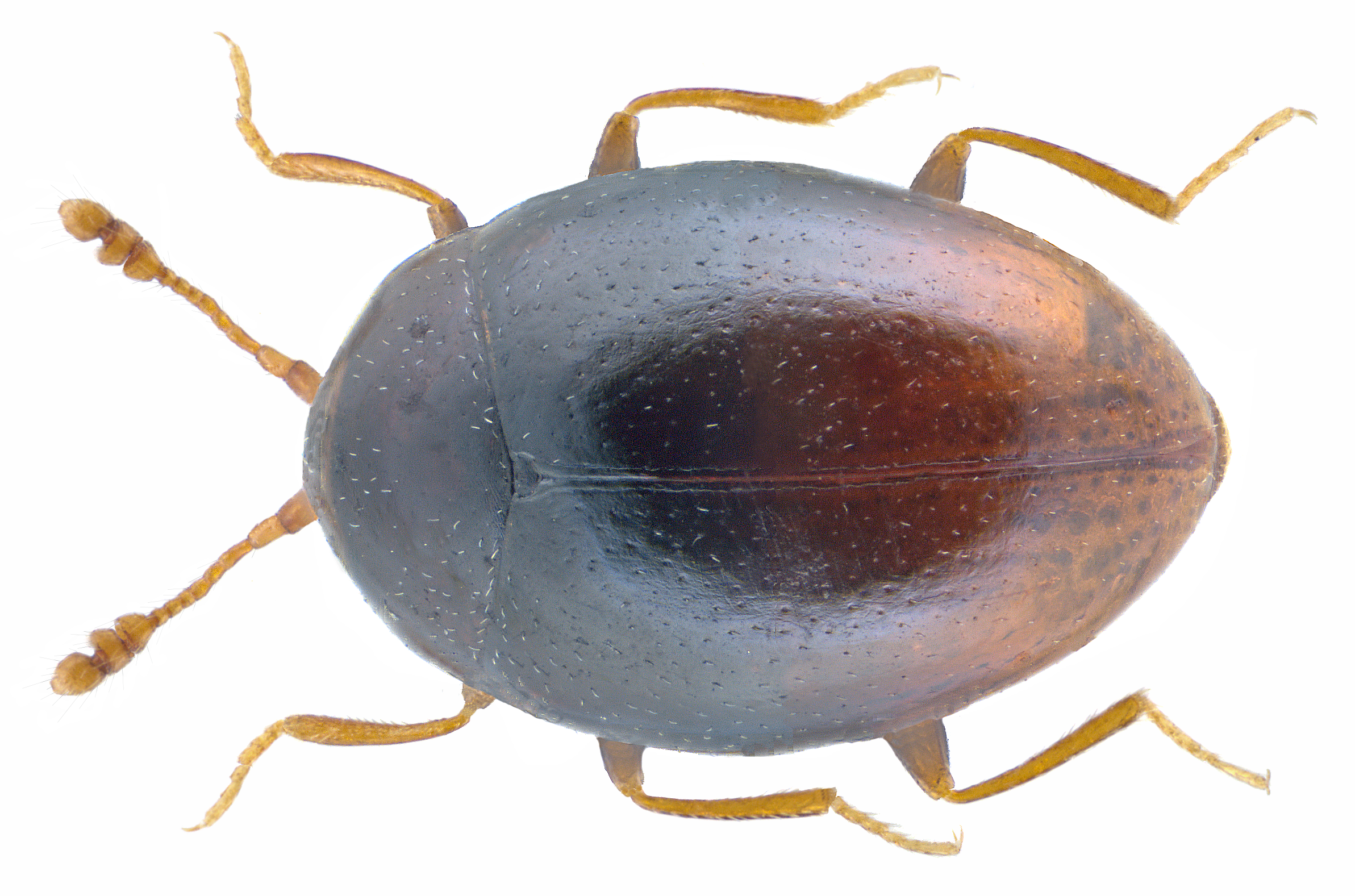
- Ephistemus globulus 1,3 mm (0,8-1,3 mm)

Scientific classification
- Kingdom: Animalia
- Phylum: Arthropoda
- Clade: Pancrustacea
- Class: Insecta
- Order: Coleoptera
- Suborder: Polyphaga
- Infraorder: Cucujiformia
- Family: Cryptophagidae
- Genus: Ephistemus
- Species: E. globulus

Binomial name
- Ephistemus globulus (Paykull, 1798)

= Ephistemus globulus =

Species of beetle

Ephistemus globulus is a species of silken fungus beetle native to Europe.
