= Cryptophagus setulosus =

Scientific classification
- Domain: Eukaryota
- Kingdom: Animalia
- Phylum: Arthropoda
- Class: Insecta
- Order: Coleoptera
- Suborder: Polyphaga
- Infraorder: Cucujiformia
- Family: Cryptophagidae
- Genus: Cryptophagus
- Species: C. setulosus

Binomial name
- Cryptophagus setulosus Sturm, 1845

Synonyms
- Cryptophagus antennatus Casey, 1900; Cryptophagus grossulus Casey, 1924

Species of beetle

Cryptophagus setulosus is a species of silken fungus beetle in the family Cryptophagidae. It is found in North America and Europe.
