= Odontacrossus obenbergeri =

Scientific classification
- Kingdom: Animalia
- Phylum: Arthropoda
- Clade: Pancrustacea
- Class: Insecta
- Order: Coleoptera
- Suborder: Polyphaga
- Infraorder: Scarabaeiformia
- Family: Scarabaeidae
- Genus: Odontacrossus
- Species: O. obenbergeri

Binomial name
- Odontacrossus obenbergeri (Balthasar, 1932)

Synonyms
- Aphodius (Acrossus) obenbergeri Balthasar, 1932

Species of beetle

Odontacrossus obenbergeri is a species of beetle of the family Scarabaeidae. It is found in China (Gansu, Sichuan).

== Description ==
Adults reach a length of about 5–6 mm (0.20–0.24 in). They have an oval-elongate, moderately convex, shiny, almost glabrous body, with some short hairs on the elytra laterally and preapically. The head and pronotum are blackish, while the elytra are piceous-black, sometimes with the apex dark reddish-brown. The legs are piceous and the antennal club is black.

== Life history ==
They inhabit open pastures and are thought to be generalist dung feeders.
