= Odontacrossus trisuliensis =

Scientific classification
- Kingdom: Animalia
- Phylum: Arthropoda
- Clade: Pancrustacea
- Class: Insecta
- Order: Coleoptera
- Suborder: Polyphaga
- Infraorder: Scarabaeiformia
- Family: Scarabaeidae
- Genus: Odontacrossus
- Species: O. trisuliensis

Binomial name
- Odontacrossus trisuliensis (Stebnicka, 1986)

Synonyms
- Aphodius (Paulianellus) trisuliensis Stebnicka, 1986

Species of beetle

Odontacrossus trisuliensis is a species of beetle of the family Scarabaeidae. It is found in Nepal and India (Arunachal Pradesh, West Bengal).

== Description ==
Adults reach a length of about 4.5–5.5 mm (0.18–0.22 in). They have an oval-elongate, moderately convex, shiny, almost glabrous body, although the elytra have some short hairs laterally and preapically. The head is piceous and the pronotum is piceous with yellowish anterior angles. The elytra are brownish or yellowish with brownish lateral margins. The legs are brownish and the antennal club is blackish.

== Life history ==
They are thought to be generalist dung feeders.
