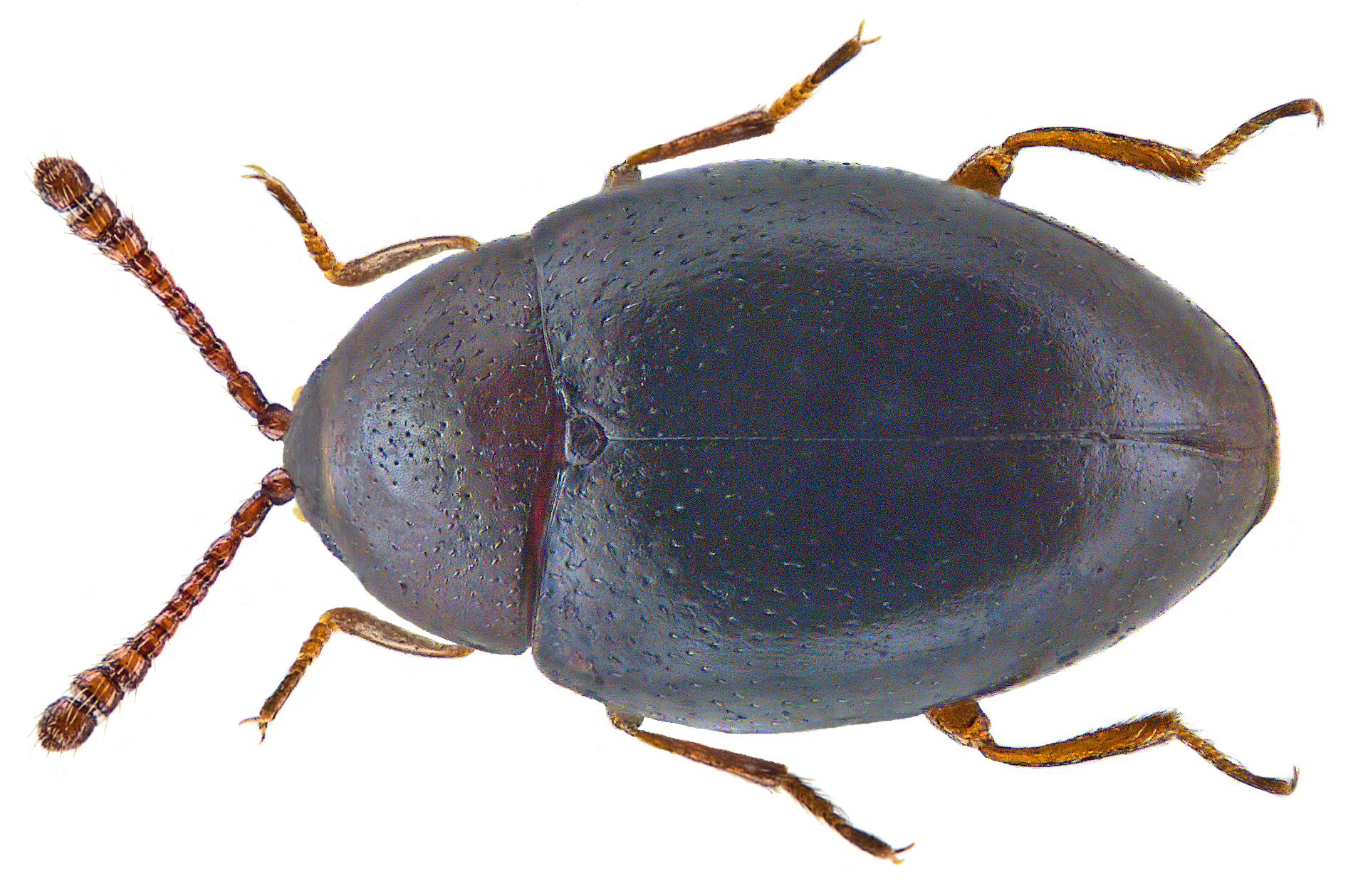

Scientific classification
- Domain: Eukaryota
- Kingdom: Animalia
- Phylum: Arthropoda
- Class: Insecta
- Order: Coleoptera
- Suborder: Polyphaga
- Infraorder: Cucujiformia
- Family: Cryptophagidae
- Genus: Ootypus; Ganglbauer, 1899
- Species: O. globosus

Binomial name
- Ootypus globosus (Waltl, 1838)

= Ootypus =

Genus of beetles

Ootypus is a monotypic genus of beetles belonging to the family Cryptophagidae. The only species is Ootypus globosus. It is native to Europe.
