= Spavius =

Scientific classification
- Kingdom: Animalia
- Phylum: Arthropoda
- Class: Insecta
- Order: Coleoptera
- Suborder: Polyphaga
- Infraorder: Cucujiformia
- Family: Cryptophagidae
- Genus: Spavius; Motschulsky, 1844

Genus of beetles

Spavius is a genus of beetle belonging to the family Cryptophagidae.

The species of this genus are found in Europe.

Species:

- Spavius glaber (Gyllenhal, 1808)
