= Nganasania =

Scientific classification
- Domain: Eukaryota
- Kingdom: Animalia
- Phylum: Arthropoda
- Class: Insecta
- Order: Coleoptera
- Suborder: Polyphaga
- Infraorder: Cucujiformia
- Family: Cryptophagidae
- Genus: Nganasania; Zherikhin, 1977

Genus of beetles

Nganasania is a genus of beetles belonging to the family Cryptophagidae.

The species of this genus are found in Russia.

Species:

- Nganasania khetica Zherikhin, 1977
- Nganasania taymyrica Lyubarsky & Perkovsky, 2014
