= Odontacrossus pseudoobenbergeri =

Scientific classification
- Kingdom: Animalia
- Phylum: Arthropoda
- Clade: Pancrustacea
- Class: Insecta
- Order: Coleoptera
- Suborder: Polyphaga
- Infraorder: Scarabaeiformia
- Family: Scarabaeidae
- Genus: Odontacrossus
- Species: O. pseudoobenbergeri

Binomial name
- Odontacrossus pseudoobenbergeri (Červenka, 1995)

Synonyms
- Aphodius (Acrossus) pseudoobenbergeri Červenka, 1995

Species of beetle

Odontacrossus pseudoobenbergeri is a species of beetle of the family Scarabaeidae. It is found in China (Xizang, Yunnan) and Myanmar.

== Description ==
Adults reach a length of about 5.5–6.5 mm (0.22–0.26 in). They have an oval-elongate, moderately convex, mostly shiny body. The apex of the elytra is alutaceous and almost glabrous, while there are short, pale hairs laterally and subapically. The head is black and pronotum is black, but brownish laterally. The elytra are dark brownish, the legs brownish and the antennal club piceous.

== Life history ==
They are thought to be generalist dung feeders.
