= Odontacrossus =

Scientific classification
- Kingdom: Animalia
- Phylum: Arthropoda
- Clade: Pancrustacea
- Class: Insecta
- Order: Coleoptera
- Suborder: Polyphaga
- Infraorder: Scarabaeiformia
- Family: Scarabaeidae
- Subfamily: Aphodiinae
- Tribe: Aphodiini
- Genus: Odontacrossus; Dellacasa, Král, Dellacasa & Bordat, 2014

Genus of beetles

Odontacrossus is a genus of beetles of the family Scarabaeidae.

== Species ==
- Odontacrossus esseri Bellmann, 2018
- Odontacrossus obenbergeri (Balthasar, 1932)
- Odontacrossus pseudoobenbergeri (Červenka, 1995)
- Odontacrossus trisuliensis (Stebnicka, 1986)
