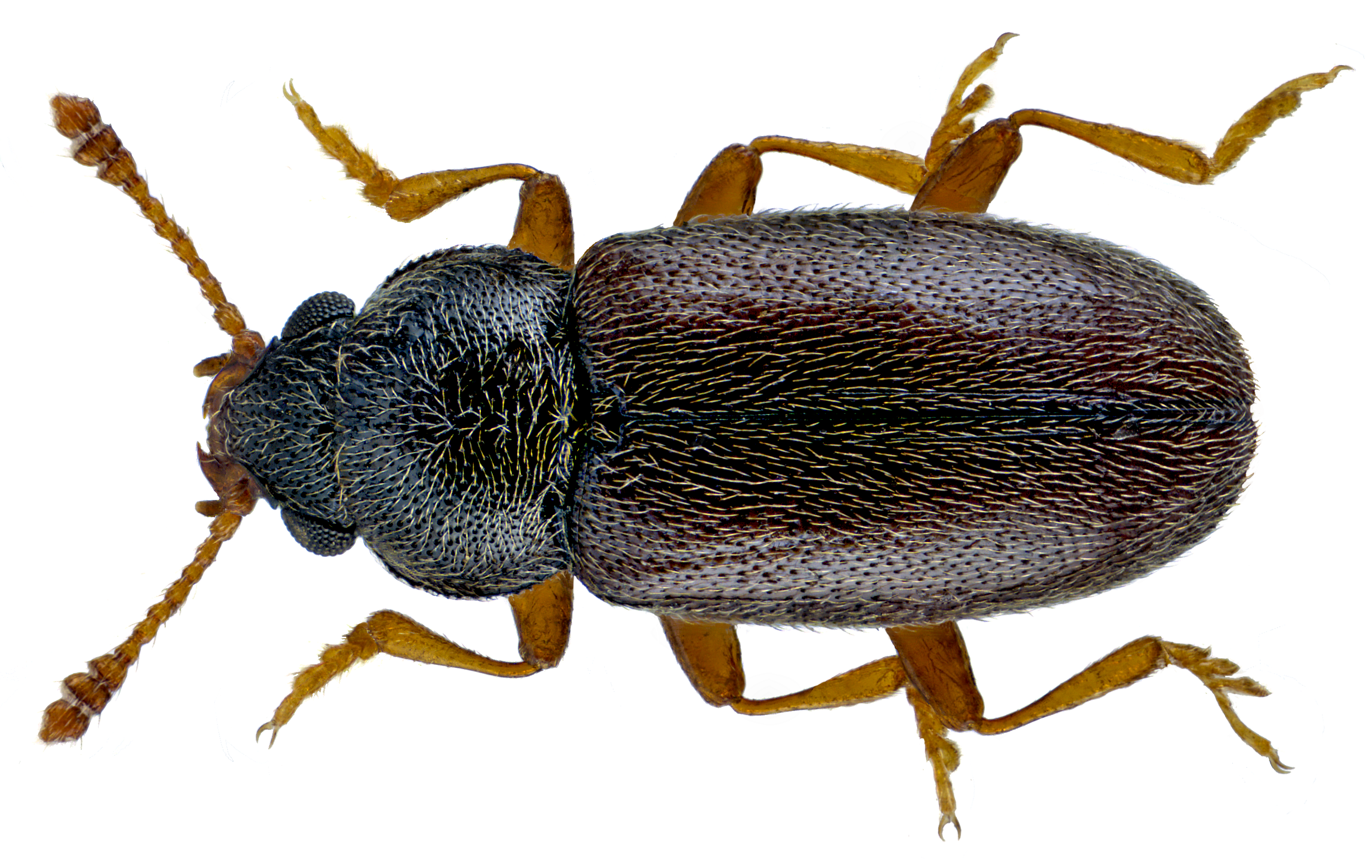
- Telmatophilus typhae

Scientific classification
- Kingdom: Animalia
- Phylum: Arthropoda
- Class: Insecta
- Order: Coleoptera
- Suborder: Polyphaga
- Infraorder: Cucujiformia
- Family: Cryptophagidae
- Subfamily: Cryptophaginae
- Tribe: Cryptophagini
- Genus: Telmatophilus; Heer, 1841

= Telmatophilus =

Genus of beetles

Telmatophilus is a genus of silken fungus beetles in the family Cryptophagidae. There are about seven described species in Telmatophilus.

== Species ==
These seven species belong to the genus Telmatophilus:

- Telmatophilus americanus (LeConte, 1863)
- Telmatophilus balcanicus Karaman, 1961
- Telmatophilus brevicollis Aubé, 1862
- Telmatophilus depressus Sharp, 1876
- Telmatophilus schoenherrii (Gyllenhal, 1808)
- Telmatophilus schonherrii (Gyllenhal, 1808)
- Telmatophilus typhae (Fallén, 1802)
