= Curelius =

Scientific classification
- Kingdom: Animalia
- Phylum: Arthropoda
- Class: Insecta
- Order: Coleoptera
- Suborder: Polyphaga
- Infraorder: Cucujiformia
- Family: Cryptophagidae
- Tribe: Atomariini
- Genus: Curelius; Casey, 1900

Genus of beetles

Curelius is a genus of silken fungus beetles in the family Cryptophagidae. There are at least two described species in Curelius.

== Species ==
These two species belong to the genus Curelius:

- Curelius exiguus (Erichson, 1846)
- Curelius japonicus (Reitter, 1877)
