= Henotiderus =

Scientific classification
- Kingdom: Animalia
- Phylum: Arthropoda
- Class: Insecta
- Order: Coleoptera
- Suborder: Polyphaga
- Infraorder: Cucujiformia
- Family: Cryptophagidae
- Tribe: Cryptophagini
- Genus: Henotiderus; Reitter, 1877

Synonyms
- Crosimus Casey, 1900; Henoticoides Hatch, 1962

Genus of beetles

Henotiderus is a genus of silken fungus beetles in the family Cryptophagidae. There are at least four described species in Henotiderus.

== Species ==
These four species belong to the genus Henotiderus:

- Henotiderus centromaculatus Reitter, 1877
- Henotiderus hirtus (Casey, 1900)
- Henotiderus lorna (Hatch, 1962)
- Henotiderus obesulus (Casey, 1900)
