= Hypocoprus =

Scientific classification
- Kingdom: Animalia
- Phylum: Arthropoda
- Class: Insecta
- Order: Coleoptera
- Suborder: Polyphaga
- Infraorder: Cucujiformia
- Family: Cryptophagidae
- Genus: Hypocoprus; Motschulsky, 1839

Genus of beetles

Hypocoprus is a genus of beetles belonging to the family Cryptophagidae.

The species of this genus are found in Europe and Northern America.

Species:

- Hypocoprus latridioides Motschulsky, 1839
- Hypocoprus tenuis Casey
