= Renodesta =

Scientific classification
- Kingdom: Animalia
- Phylum: Arthropoda
- Class: Insecta
- Order: Coleoptera
- Suborder: Polyphaga
- Infraorder: Cucujiformia
- Family: Cryptophagidae
- Tribe: Caenoscelini
- Genus: Renodesta; Caterino, Leschen & Johnson, 2008

Genus of beetles

Renodesta is a genus of silken fungus beetles in the family Cryptophagidae. There are at least two described species in Renodesta.

== Species ==
These two species belong to the genus Renodesta:

- Renodesta ramsdalei Caterino, Leschen & Johnson, 2008
- Renodesta stephani Caterino, Leschen & Johnson, 2008
