= Salebius =

Scientific classification
- Kingdom: Animalia
- Phylum: Arthropoda
- Class: Insecta
- Order: Coleoptera
- Suborder: Polyphaga
- Infraorder: Cucujiformia
- Family: Cryptophagidae
- Tribe: Cryptophagini
- Genus: Salebius; Casey, 1900

Genus of beetles

Salebius is a genus of silken fungus beetles in the family Cryptophagidae. There are at least four described species in Salebius.

== Species ==
These four species belong to the genus Salebius:

- Salebius hirsutus Dajoz, 1988
- Salebius lictor Casey, 1900
- Salebius minax Casey, 1900
- Salebius octodentatus (Mäklin, 1852)
