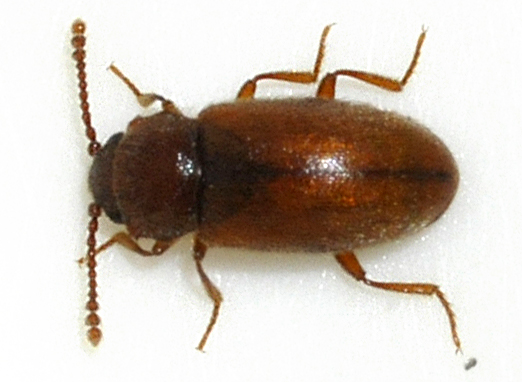
- Adult of unidentified Cryptophagus species from Göttinger Wald, Germany

Scientific classification
- Kingdom: Animalia
- Phylum: Arthropoda
- Clade: Pancrustacea
- Class: Insecta
- Order: Coleoptera
- Suborder: Polyphaga
- Infraorder: Cucujiformia
- Family: Cryptophagidae
- Tribe: Cryptophagini
- Genus: Cryptophagus; Herbst, 1863

Species
- see text

= Cryptophagus =

Genus of beetles

Cryptophagus is a genus of beetles in the family Cryptophagidae, the silken fungus beetles. It is distributed across all the biogeographic realms of the world. Like most of the other beetles in the family, these are fungivores, feeding on fungal spores and hyphae.

== Description and ecology ==
These beetles are flattened and oval in shape, and are generally 2 to 3 millimeters long. They are reddish to dark brown, sometimes with yellowish patterns on the elytra. The thorax is often sculptured with teeth, angles, or other projections. Some are hairy. The larva is usually yellow-brown and cylindrical but flattened, with visible legs.

Some species are considered pests when they inhabit stores of grain, flour, bread, dried fruit, and other products, however, the beetles feed on fungi growing on the food product rather than the product itself. They also breed in the fungi, laying eggs in the hyphae. They are more common in products that are damp and moldy. The beetles can transmit fungal spores to products, encouraging mold growth. In Canada the beetles are common in the grain-producing prairie regions.

These beetles can be found in other habitats where fungi are available, such as beehives, the nests of other hymenopterans such as wasps and ants, rodent nests, and wool.

== Selected species ==
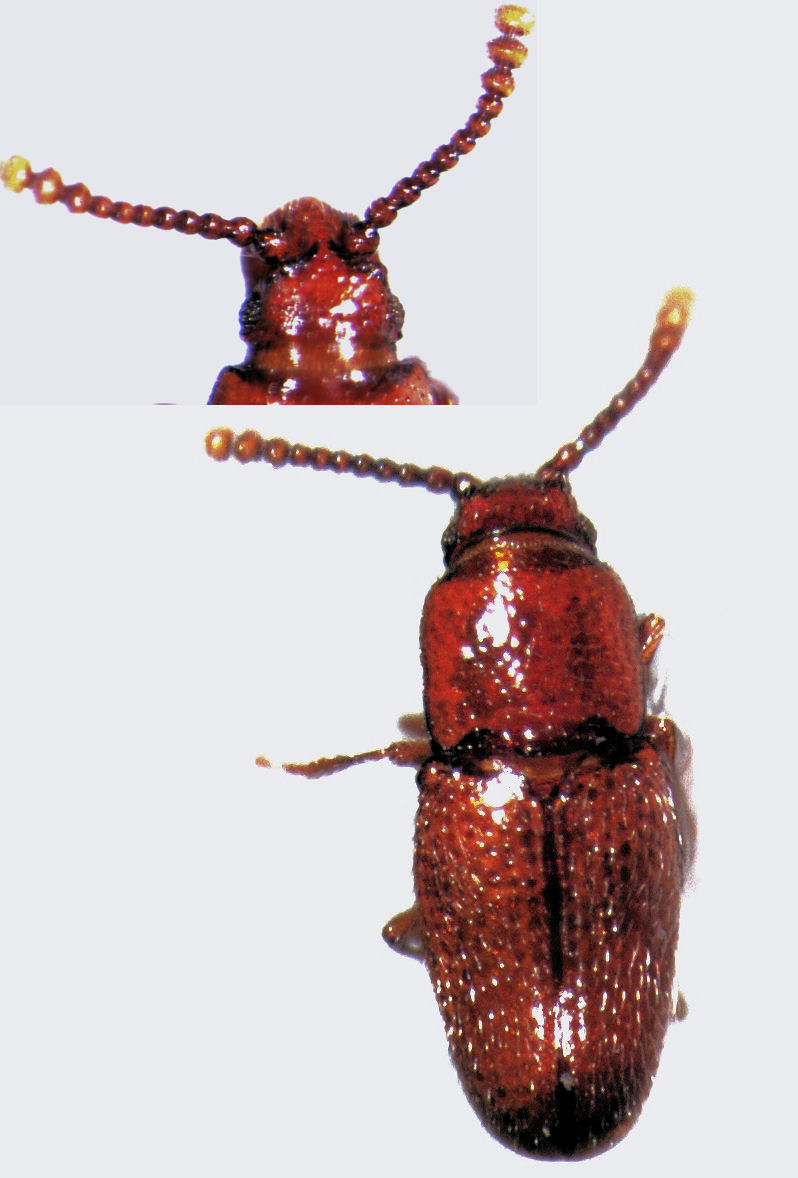
Cryptophagus amoenus specimen from Maungatautari, New Zealand

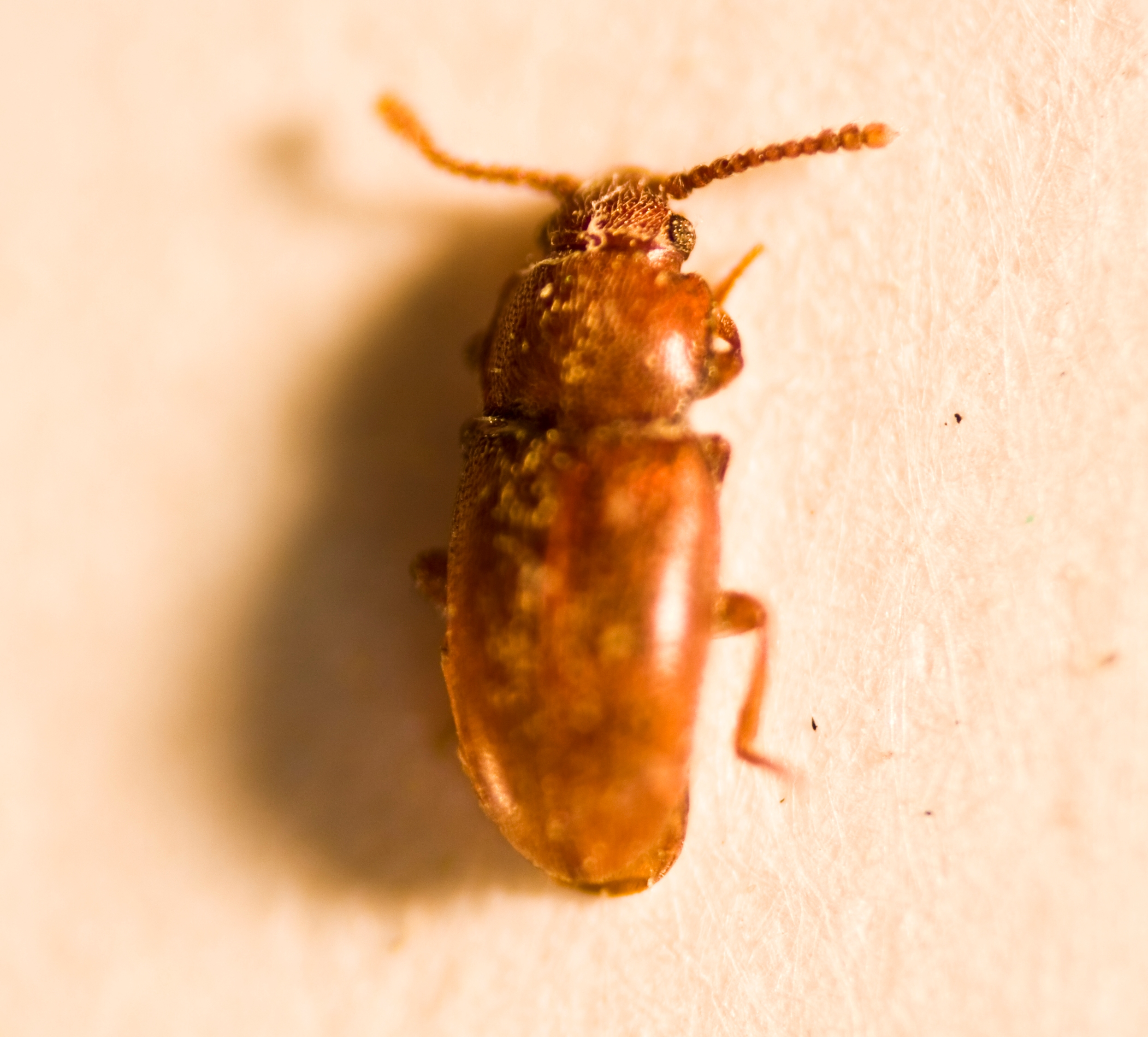
Cryptophagus lemonchei paratype

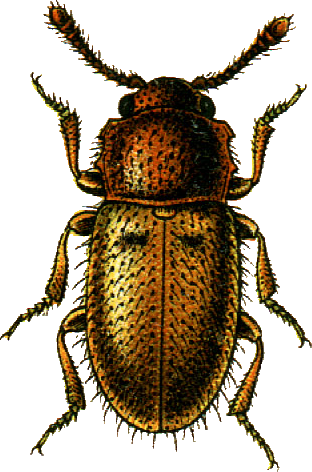
Cryptophagus lycoperdi illustration

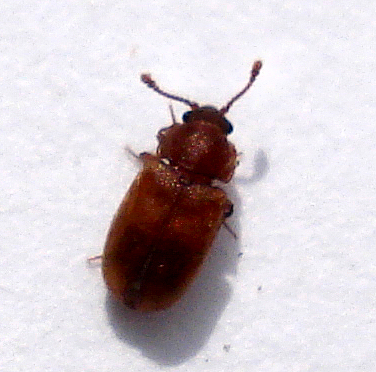
Cryptophagus pubescens or a similar species from Boultham Moor, England

Species include:

- Cryptophagus acuminatus Coombs & Woodroffe, 1955
- Cryptophagus acutangulus – acute-angled fungus beetle
- Cryptophagus affinis Sturm, 1845
- Cryptophagus amoenus Thomas Broun, 1912
- Cryptophagus amfidoxus Bruce, 1963
- Cryptophagus anatolicus Bruce, 1963
- Cryptophagus archangelicus
- Cryptophagus arctomyos Sainte-Claire Deville, 1927
- Cryptophagus ariadne Otero & González, 1980
- Cryptophagus aurelii Otero & López, 2011
- Cryptophagus axillaris Reitter, 1875
- Cryptophagus badius
- Cryptophagus baldensis
- Cryptophagus bedeli
- Cryptophagus bidentatus (= C.punctatissimus)
- Cryptophagus bipedes
- Cryptophagus blasi Otero & González, 1982
- Cryptophagus boulderanus Casey, 1924
- Cryptophagus brisouti Reitter, 1875
- Cryptophagus brucki Reitter, 1875
- Cryptophagus bussi Esser, 2017
- Cryptophagus cellaris – cellar fungus beetle (= C.angustatus, C.rupimontis)
- Cryptophagus confertus
- Cryptophagus confusus
- Cryptophagus coombsi Esser, 2018
- Cryptophagus corticinus (= C.depressulus)
- Cryptophagus croceus
- Cryptophagus croaticus Reitter, 1879
- Cryptophagus cylindrus
- Cryptophagus demarzoi Otero & Angelini, 1981
- Cryptophagus dentatus (= C.quadridentatus)
- Cryptophagus denticulatus
- Cryptophagus deubeli
- Cryptophagus difficilis (= C.contractus)
- Cryptophagus discedens
- Cryptophagus distinguendus
- Cryptophagus dorsaliformis Reitter, 1879
- Cryptophagus dorsalis
- Cryptophagus durus Reitter, 1878
- Cryptophagus ellipticus
- Cryptophagus erichsoni Reitter, 1877
- Cryptophagus escolai
- Cryptophagus falcozi
- Cryptophagus fallax
- Cryptophagus fasciatus
- Cryptophagus freyi
- Cryptophagus friwaldszkyi
- Cryptophagus fumidulus
- Cryptophagus fuscicornis
- Cryptophagus fusiformis
- Cryptophagus grahammontanus Esser, 2018
- Cryptophagus hauseri Reitter, 1890
- Cryptophagus hebes
- Cryptophagus hexagonalis
- Cryptophagus histricus
- Cryptophagus hongguanus Esser, 2017
- Cryptophagus hupalupae
- Cryptophagus impressus
- Cryptophagus inaequalis Reitter, 1878
- Cryptophagus inmixtus
- Cryptophagus intermedius
- Cryptophagus jakowlewi
- Cryptophagus jaloszynskii Otero & Pereira, 2018
- Cryptophagus jemeniticus Esser, 2021
- Cryptophagus jemezmontanus Esser, 2018
- Cryptophagus kamtschaticus
- Cryptophagus labilis
- Cryptophagus lapidicola Reitter, 1878
- Cryptophagus lapponicus
- Cryptophagus latens
- Cryptophagus latus
- Cryptophagus laticollis (= C.cribricollis, C.inscitus)
- Cryptophagus lecontei
- Cryptophagus lemonchei
- Cryptophagus lycoperdi
- Cryptophagus lysholmi
- Cryptophagus magdalenamontanus Esser, 2017
- Cryptophagus mainensis
- Cryptophagus maximus
- Cryptophagus micaceus
- Cryptophagus minotaurus
- Cryptophagus montanus
- Cryptophagus montemurroi Otero & Angelini, 1984
- Cryptophagus nitidulus
- Cryptophagus nobilis
- Cryptophagus obsoletus Reitter, 1879
- Cryptophagus okalii
- Cryptophagus oromii
- Cryptophagus outereloi
- Cryptophagus pallidus
- Cryptophagus parallelus
- Cryptophagus peloponnesicus Esser, 2021
- Cryptophagus peregrinus
- Cryptophagus pilosus (= C.punctipennis)
- Cryptophagus plenus
- Cryptophagus politus
- Cryptophagus populi
- Cryptophagus porrectus
- Cryptophagus posticus Reitter, 1888
- Cryptophagus pseudodentatus
- Cryptophagus pseudoschmidti
- Cryptophagus pubescens
- Cryptophagus puetzi Esser, 2017
- Cryptophagus quadrihamatus
- Cryptophagus quadrimaculatus Reitter, 1877
- Cryptophagus quercinus
- Cryptophagus redondoensis Esser, 2018
- Cryptophagus reflexicollis Reitter, 1876
- Cryptophagus reflexus
- Cryptophagus reichardti
- Cryptophagus rotundatus
- Cryptophagus ruficornis
- Cryptophagus rutae
- Cryptophagus saginatus
- Cryptophagus sanmateomontanus Esser, 2018
- Cryptophagus scanicus
- Cryptophagus schmidti
- Cryptophagus schroetteri Reitter, 1912
- Cryptophagus schuelkei Esser, 2017
- Cryptophagus scutellatus
- Cryptophagus setulosus (= C.antennatus, C.grossulus)
- Cryptophagus simplex
- Cryptophagus skalitzkyi Reitter, 1875
- Cryptophagus spadiceus
- Cryptophagus sporadum
- Cryptophagus stephani Esser, 2018
- Cryptophagus straussi
- Cryptophagus stromus
- Cryptophagus subdepressus
- Cryptophagus subfumatus
- Cryptophagus subvittatus Reitter, 1887
- Cryptophagus thomsoni Reitter, 1875
- Cryptophagus tuberculosus
- Cryptophagus uralensis
- Cryptophagus valens
- Cryptophagus varus – sigmoid fungus beetle
- Cryptophagus versicolor
- Cryptophagus vestigialis
- Cryptophagus vseteckai
- Cryptophagus wachteli Esser, 2013

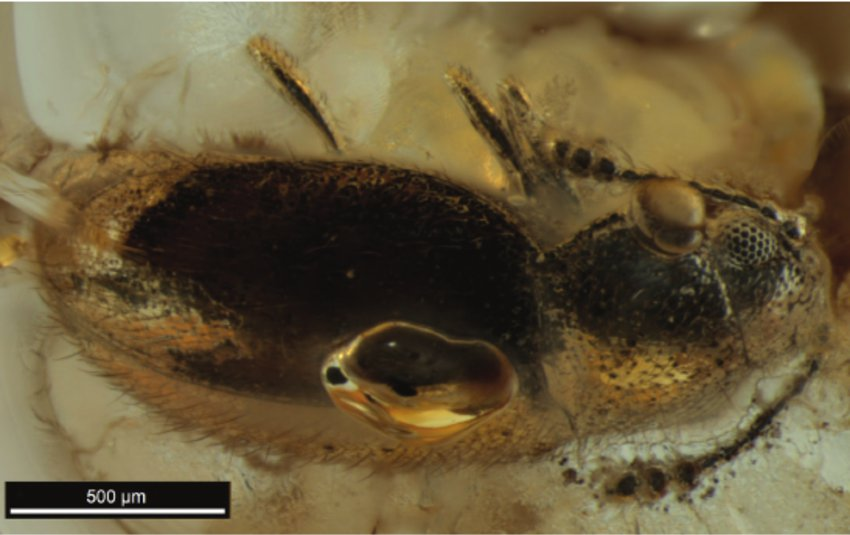
Cryptophagus alexagrestis amber specimen (scale = 0.5 mm)

Some fossil species have been discovered in amber and as compression fossils in rock:

- †Cryptophagus alexagrestis Lyubarsky & Perkovsky, 2011
- †Cryptophagus bassleri
- †Cryptophagus harenus
- †Cryptophagus petricola
- †Cryptophagus suncholensis
