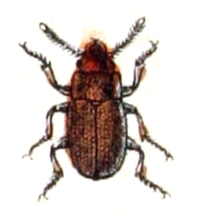
- Antherophagus pallens

Scientific classification
- Kingdom: Animalia
- Phylum: Arthropoda
- Class: Insecta
- Order: Coleoptera
- Suborder: Polyphaga
- Infraorder: Cucujiformia
- Family: Cryptophagidae
- Tribe: Cryptophagini
- Genus: Antherophagus; Dejean, 1821

= Antherophagus =

Genus of beetles

Antherophagus is a genus of silken fungus beetles in the family Cryptophagidae. There are at least four described species in Antherophagus.

ITIS Taxonomic note:

- The genus name Antherophagus has been variously attributed to Dejean 1821:45 (e.g., Leschen 1996:587) or to Latreille 1829:507 (e.g., Bousquet 1989:12). Under the current International Code of Zoological Nomenclature, Dejean's use is now considered valid by indication with the type species being designated by Westwood, as cited by Leschen (pers. comm., Dr. Paul Skelley, January 2013).

== Species ==
The following species are recognised in the genus Antherophagus:

- Antherophagus canescens Erichson, 1846
- Antherophagus convexulus LeConte, 1863
- Antherophagus megalops Wickham, 1913
- Antherophagus ochraceus Melsheimer, 1844
- Antherophagus pallens (Fabricius, 1781)
- Antherophagus pallens (Linnaeus, 1758)
- Antherophagus pallidivestis Casey, 1900
- Antherophagus priscus Scudder, 1876
- Antherophagus silaceus (Herbst, 1792)
- Antherophagus similis Curtis, 1835
- Antherophagus suturalis Mäklin, 1853
