= Pteryngium =

Scientific classification
- Kingdom: Animalia
- Phylum: Arthropoda
- Class: Insecta
- Order: Coleoptera
- Suborder: Polyphaga
- Infraorder: Cucujiformia
- Family: Cryptophagidae
- Tribe: Cryptophagini
- Genus: Pteryngium; Reitter, 1887

Genus of beetles

Pteryngium is a genus of silken fungus beetles in the family Cryptophagidae. There is one described species in Pteryngium, P. crenatum.
