= Tisactia =

Scientific classification
- Kingdom: Animalia
- Phylum: Arthropoda
- Class: Insecta
- Order: Coleoptera
- Suborder: Polyphaga
- Infraorder: Cucujiformia
- Family: Cryptophagidae
- Tribe: Atomariini
- Genus: Tisactia; Casey, 1900

Genus of beetles

Tisactia is a genus of silken fungus beetles in the family Cryptophagidae. There is one described species in Tisactia, T. subglabra.
