= Amydropa =

Amydropa anophthalma

Scientific classification
- Kingdom: Animalia
- Phylum: Arthropoda
- Class: Insecta
- Order: Coleoptera
- Suborder: Polyphaga
- Infraorder: Cucujiformia
- Family: Silvanidae
- Genus: Amydropa; Reitter, 1877
- Species: A. anophthalma

Binomial name
- Amydropa anophthalma Reitter, 1877

Genus of beetles

Amydropa anophthalma is a species of beetle in the family Silvanidae, the only species in the genus Amydropa. Some taxonomies place it in the family Cryptophagidae.
