= Myrmedophila =

Scientific classification
- Domain: Eukaryota
- Kingdom: Animalia
- Phylum: Arthropoda
- Class: Insecta
- Order: Coleoptera
- Suborder: Polyphaga
- Infraorder: Cucujiformia
- Family: Cryptophagidae
- Tribe: Cryptophagini
- Genus: Myrmedophila; Bousquet, 1989

Genus of beetles

Myrmedophila is a genus of silken fungus beetles in the family Cryptophagidae. There is one described species in Myrmedophila, M. americana.
