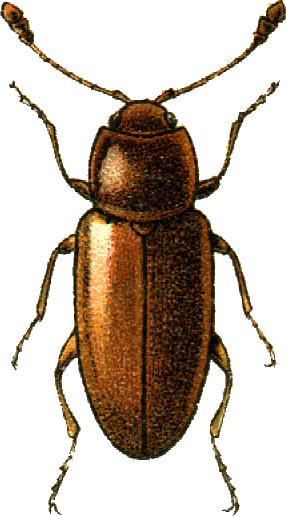
- Caenoscelis ferruginea

Scientific classification
- Kingdom: Animalia
- Phylum: Arthropoda
- Clade: Pancrustacea
- Class: Insecta
- Order: Coleoptera
- Suborder: Polyphaga
- Infraorder: Cucujiformia
- Family: Cryptophagidae
- Tribe: Caenoscelini
- Genus: Caenoscelis; Thomson, 1863

Synonyms
- Macrodea Casey, 1924

= Caenoscelis =

Genus of beetles

Caenoscelis is a genus of silken fungus beetles in the family Cryptophagidae. There are about 19 described species in Caenoscelis.

== Species ==
These 19 species belong to the genus Caenoscelis:

- Caenoscelis angelinii Johnson & Bowestead, 2003
- Caenoscelis angusticollis Casey, 1900
- Caenoscelis antennalis (Casey, 1924)
- Caenoscelis basalis Casey, 1900
- Caenoscelis cryptophaga Reitter, 1875
- Caenoscelis elongata Casey, 1900
- Caenoscelis ferruginea (Sahlberg, 1820)
- Caenoscelis humifera Esser, 2008
- Caenoscelis macilenta Casey, 1900
- Caenoscelis macra Casey, 1900
- Caenoscelis obscura Casey, 1900
- Caenoscelis ochreosa Casey, 1900
- Caenoscelis ovipennis Casey, 1900
- Caenoscelis paralella Casey, 1900
- Caenoscelis shastanica Casey, 1900
- Caenoscelis sibirica Reitter, 1889
- Caenoscelis subdeplanata Brisout de Barneville, 1882
- Caenoscelis subfuscata Casey, 1900
- Caenoscelis tenerifensis Johnson & Bowestead, 2003
