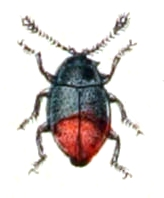
- Ephistemus globulus

Scientific classification
- Kingdom: Animalia
- Phylum: Arthropoda
- Class: Insecta
- Order: Coleoptera
- Suborder: Polyphaga
- Infraorder: Cucujiformia
- Family: Cryptophagidae
- Genus: Ephistemus; Stephens, 1829

= Ephistemus =

Genus of beetles

Ephistemus is a genus comprising several species of beetles. It is contained in the family Cryptophagidae. Species within this genus include the silken fungus beetle (Ephistemus globulus) and E. reitteri.
