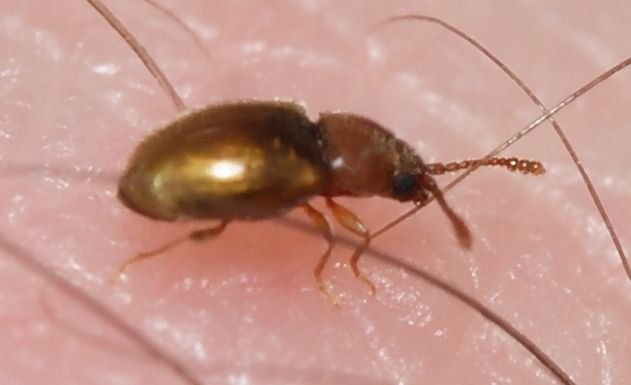

Scientific classification
- Kingdom: Animalia
- Phylum: Arthropoda
- Clade: Pancrustacea
- Class: Insecta
- Order: Coleoptera
- Suborder: Polyphaga
- Infraorder: Cucujiformia
- Family: Cryptophagidae
- Tribe: Atomariini
- Genus: Atomaria; Stephens, 1829

Diversity
- at least 160 species

Synonyms
- Agathengis Gozis, 1886; Anchicera Thomson, 1863

= Atomaria =

Genus of beetles

Atomaria is a genus of silken fungus beetles in the family Cryptophagidae. There are more than 160 described species in Atomaria.

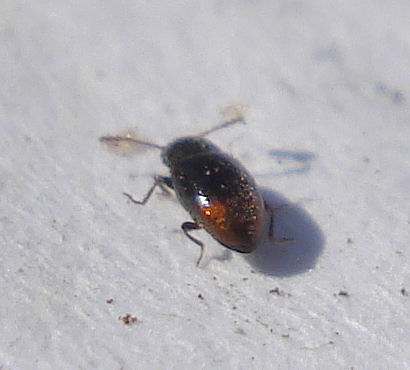

== See also ==
- List of Atomaria species
