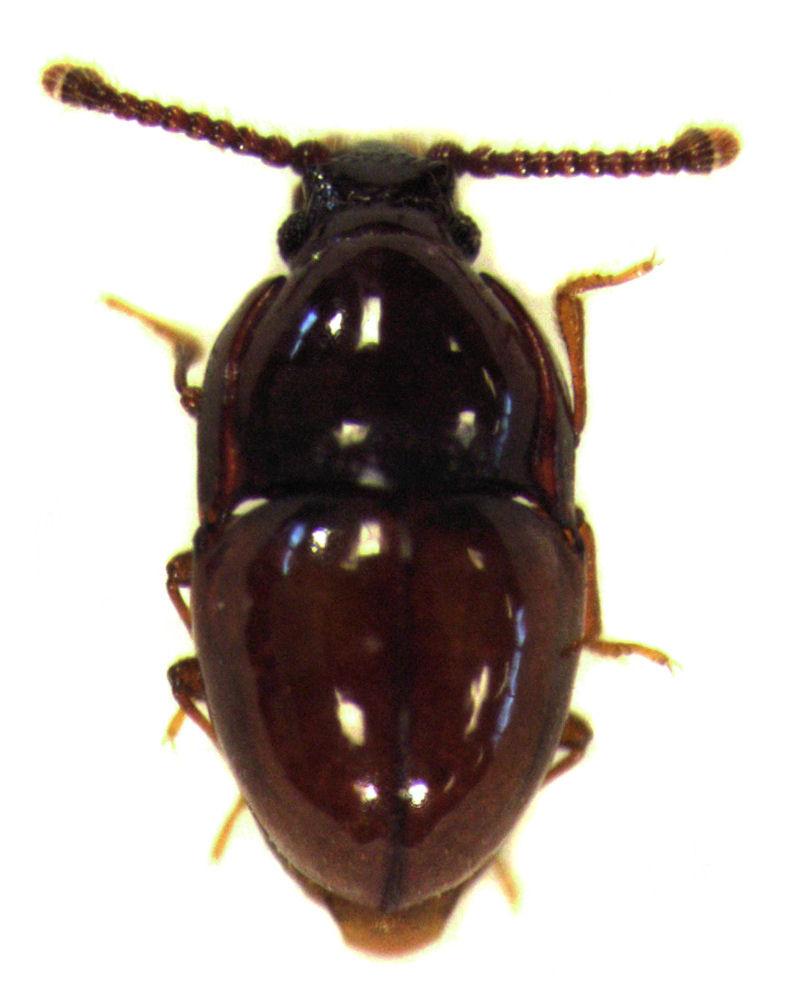
- Picrotus thoracicus

Scientific classification
- Kingdom: Animalia
- Phylum: Arthropoda
- Clade: Pancrustacea
- Class: Insecta
- Order: Coleoptera
- Suborder: Polyphaga
- Infraorder: Cucujiformia
- Superfamily: Cucujoidea
- Family: Cryptophagidae; Kirby, 1826

= Cryptophagidae =

Cryptophagidae Temporal range: Barremian–Recent

Family of beetles

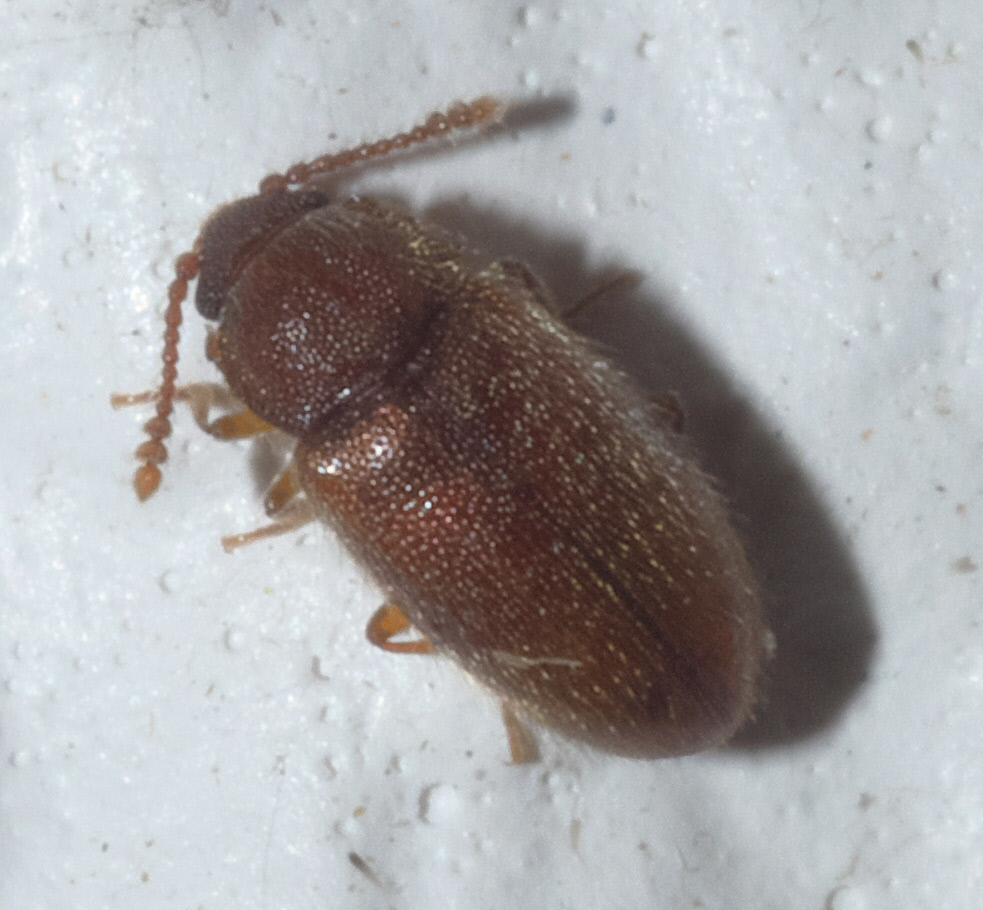
Silken fungus beetles, Cryptophagidae

Cryptophagidae is a family of beetles with representatives found in all biogeographic realms. Members of this family are commonly called silken fungus beetles and both adults and larvae appear to feed exclusively on fungi although in a wide variety of habitats and situations, such as rotting wood and shed animal fur and feathers. These beetles vary from about 1 to 11 millimeters long, and usually have an oval body shape with a slight "waist".

Around 600 species have been described and are placed in about 60 genera in two subfamilies.

Subfamilies:

- Atomariinae
- Cryptophaginae

== Genera ==
Genera placed in family Cryptophagidae are:

- Alfieriella Wittmer, 1935^{g}
- Amydropa Reitter, 1877^{i c g}
- Anitamaria Leschen, 1996^{g}
- Antarcticotectus Brookes, 1951^{g}
- Antherophagus Dejean, 1821^{i c g b}
- Atomaria Stephens, 1829^{i c g b}
- Caenoscelis Thomson, 1863^{i c g b}
- Cryptophagites Ponomarenko, 1990^{g}
- Cryptophagus Herbst, 1792^{i c g b}
- Cryptothelypterus Leschen & Lawrence, 1991^{g}
- Curelius Casey, 1900^{i c g b}
- Dernostea Sasaji, 1984^{g}
- Ephistemus Stephens, 1829^{i c g b}
- Henoticus Thomson, 1868^{i c g b}
- Henotiderus Reitter, 1877^{i c g b}
- Hypocoprus Motschoulsky, 1839^{g b}
- Hypophagus Lyubarsky, 1989^{i c g}
- Meybohmia Esser, 2006^{g}
- Micrambe Thomson, 1863^{g}
- Myrmedophila Bousquet, 1989^{i c b}
- Nganasania Zherikhin, 1977^{g}
- Ootypus Ganglbauer, 1899^{g}
- Ostreacryptus Leschen, 2001^{g}
- Paramecosoma Curtis, 1833^{g}
- Paratomaria Leschen, 1996^{g}
- Parephistemus Casey, 1924^{i c g}
- Pteryngium Reitter, 1887^{i c g b}
- Renodesta Caterino, Leschen & Johnson, 2008^{i c g b}
- Salebius Casey, 1900^{i c g b}
- Serratomaria Nakane & Hisamatsu, 1963^{g}
- Spaniophaenus Reitter, 1875^{g}
- Spavius Motschulsky, 1844^{g}
- Sternodea Reitter, 1875^{i c g}
- Telmatophilus Heer, 1841^{i c g b}
- Tisactia Casey, 1900^{i c g b}
- Tomarops Grouvelle, 1903^{g}

Data sources: i = ITIS, c = Catalogue of Life, g = GBIF, b = Bugguide.net

=== Extinct genera ===
- †Lebanophytum Kirejtshuk and Azar 2008 Lebanese amber, Early Cretaceous (Barremian)
- Subfamily Atomariinae LeConte 1861
- Tribe Atomariini Le Conte 1861
  - †Nganasania Zherikhin 1977 Taimyr amber, Russia, Late Cretaceous (Santonian)
  - †Shixitomaria Lyubarsky and Perkovsky 2018 Shixi Formation, China, Early Cretaceous (Albian)
- Subfamily Cryptophaginae Kirby 1837
- Tribe Cryptophagini Kirby 1837
  - †Albocryptophagus Peris et al. 2017 El Soplao amber (Spanish amber), Spain, Albian
  - †Ennoticus Lyubarsky and Perkovsky 2017 Taimyr amber, Russia, Santonian
  - †Microticus Lyubarsky and Perkovsky 2015 Taimyr amber, Russia, Santonian
  - †Spaniophagus Lyubarsky and Perkovsky 2019 Baltic amber, Russia, Eocene
