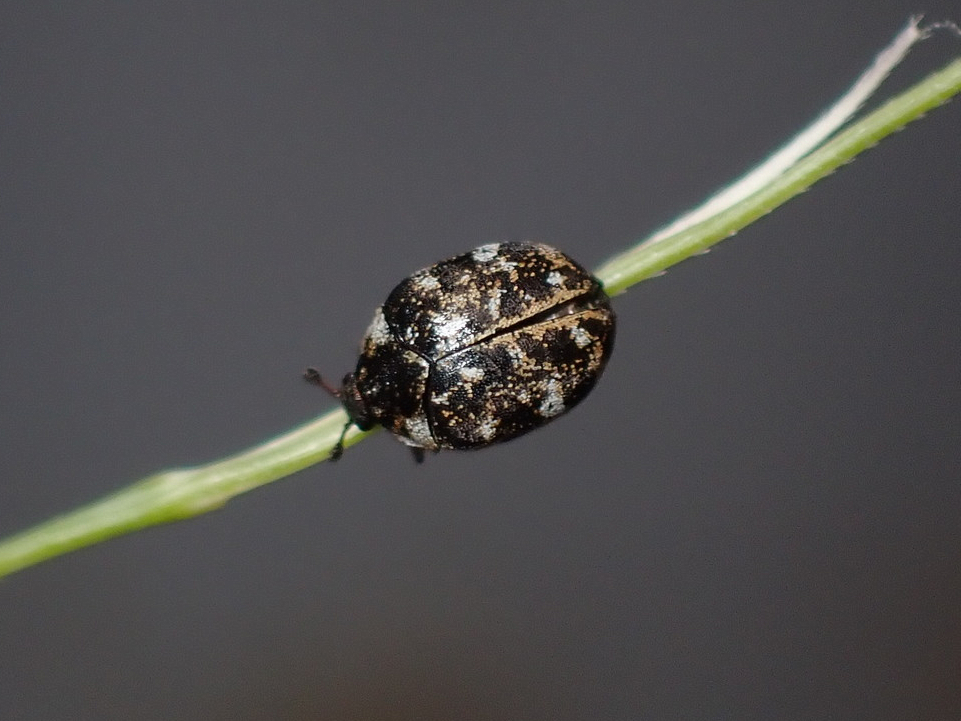

Scientific classification
- Kingdom: Animalia
- Phylum: Arthropoda
- Class: Insecta
- Order: Coleoptera
- Suborder: Polyphaga
- Family: Dermestidae
- Genus: Anthrenus
- Subgenus: Anthrenus
- Species: A. festivus

Binomial name
- Anthrenus festivus Erichson, 1846

= Anthrenus festivus =

Species of beetle

Anthrenus festivus is a species of carpet beetle in the family Dermestidae. It is generally found in Western Europe: Austria, France, Germany, Portugal, Italy (only Sardinia and Sicily), Spain (with Balearic Islands), Switzerland. Species also appears in Northern Africa (Morocco, Tunisia), Israel and possibly in Cyprus.

== See also ==
- Anthrenus pimpinellae complex

Similar species:

- Anthrenus angustefasciatus, known from Europe. Usually due to missing setae and overlap in distribution
- Anthrenus lepidus, from North America
- Anthrenus scrophulariae, cosmopolitan. Possible distribution overlap in Southern Europe
- Anthrenus ethiopicus, from Africa
- Possibly Anthrenus picturatus (Eastern Europe) and Anthrenus kenyaensis (Africa)
