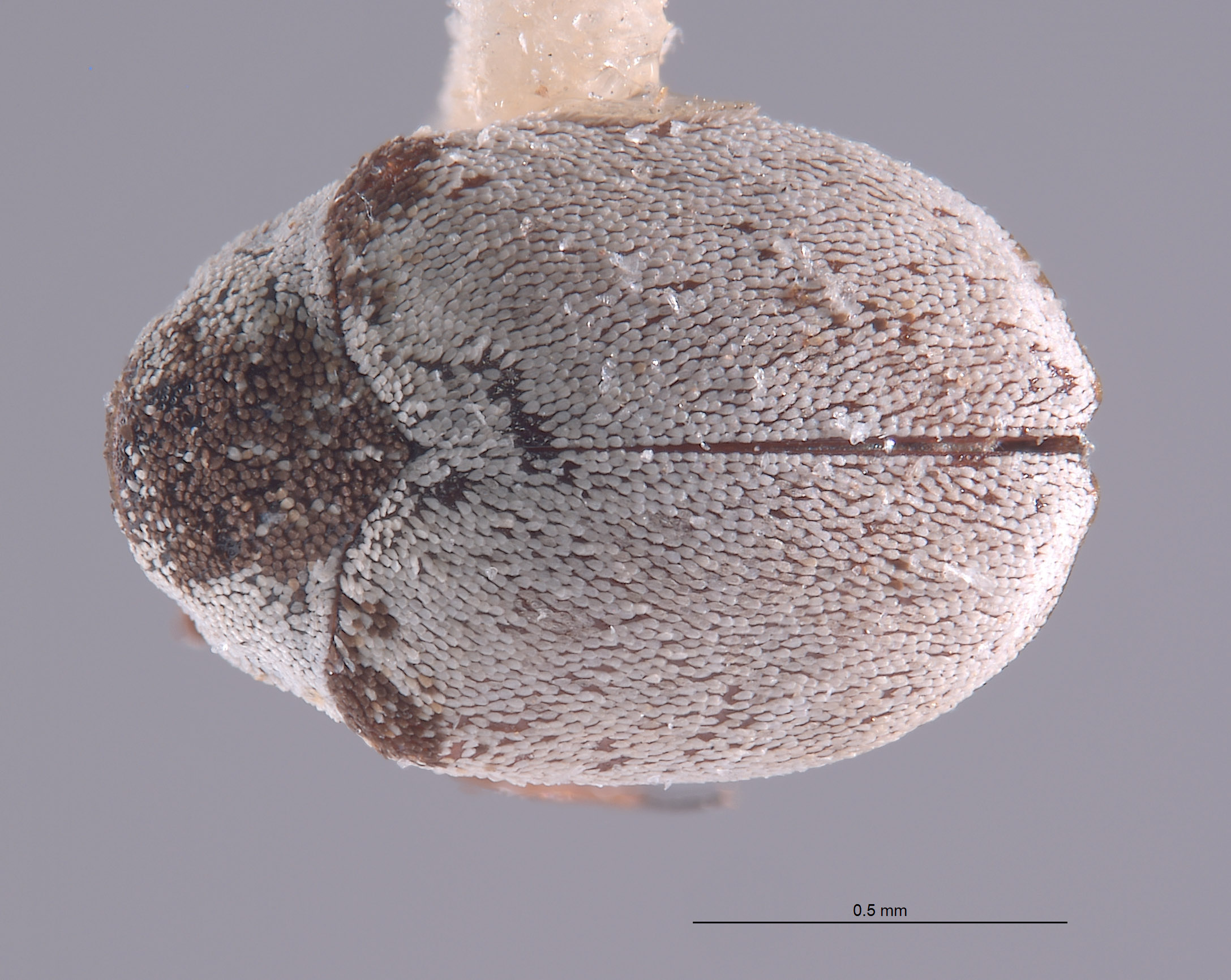
- Dorsal image
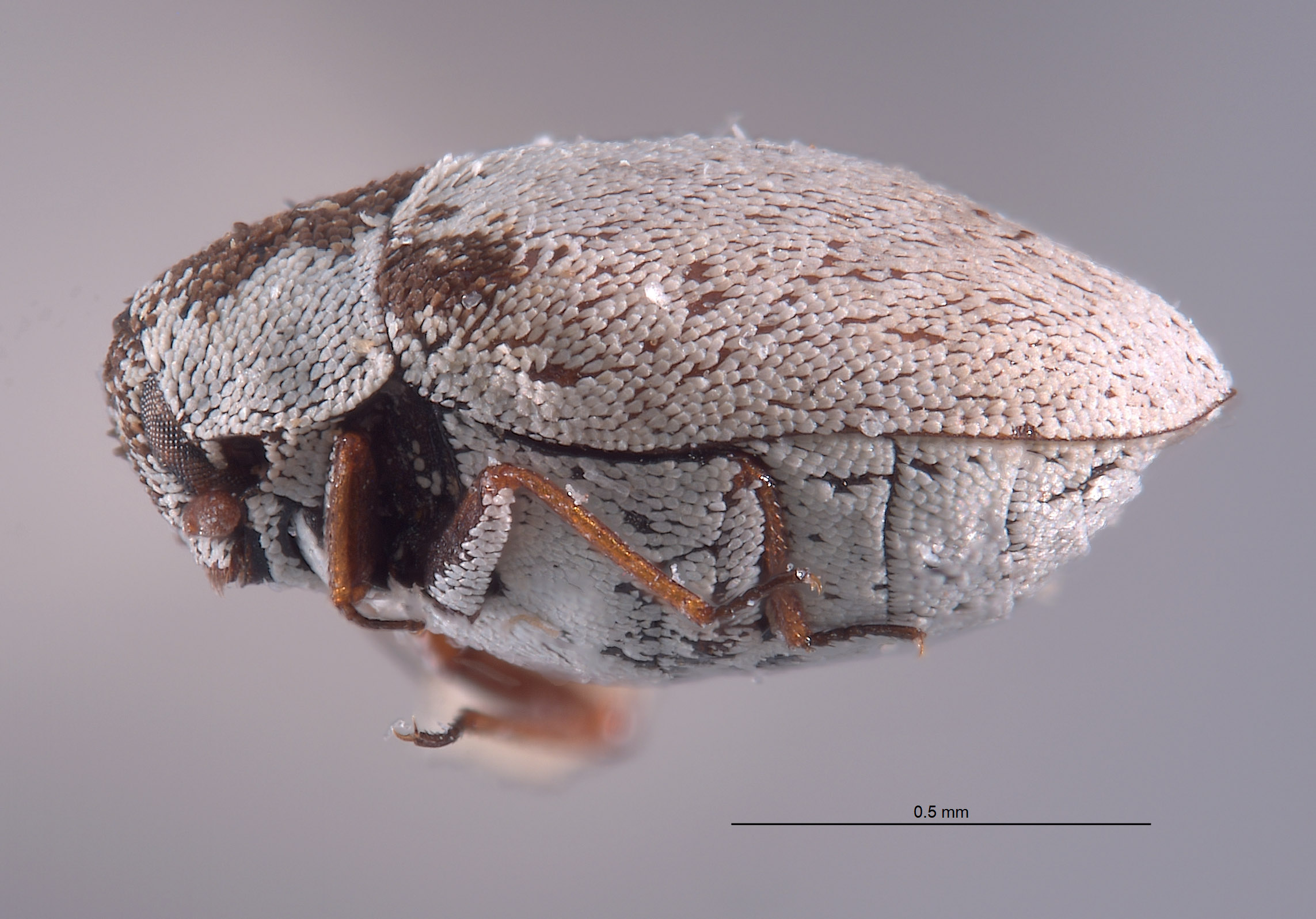
- Lateral image

Scientific classification
- Kingdom: Animalia
- Phylum: Arthropoda
- Class: Insecta
- Order: Coleoptera
- Suborder: Polyphaga
- Family: Dermestidae
- Genus: Anthrenus
- Subgenus: Anthrenus
- Species: A. umbra

Binomial name
- Anthrenus umbra Beal, 1998

= Anthrenus umbra =

Species of beetle

Anthrenus umbra is a species of carpet beetle in the subgenus Anthrenus of the genus Anthrenus, family Dermestidae. It is known from Mexico (Sonora) and the United States (Arizona).

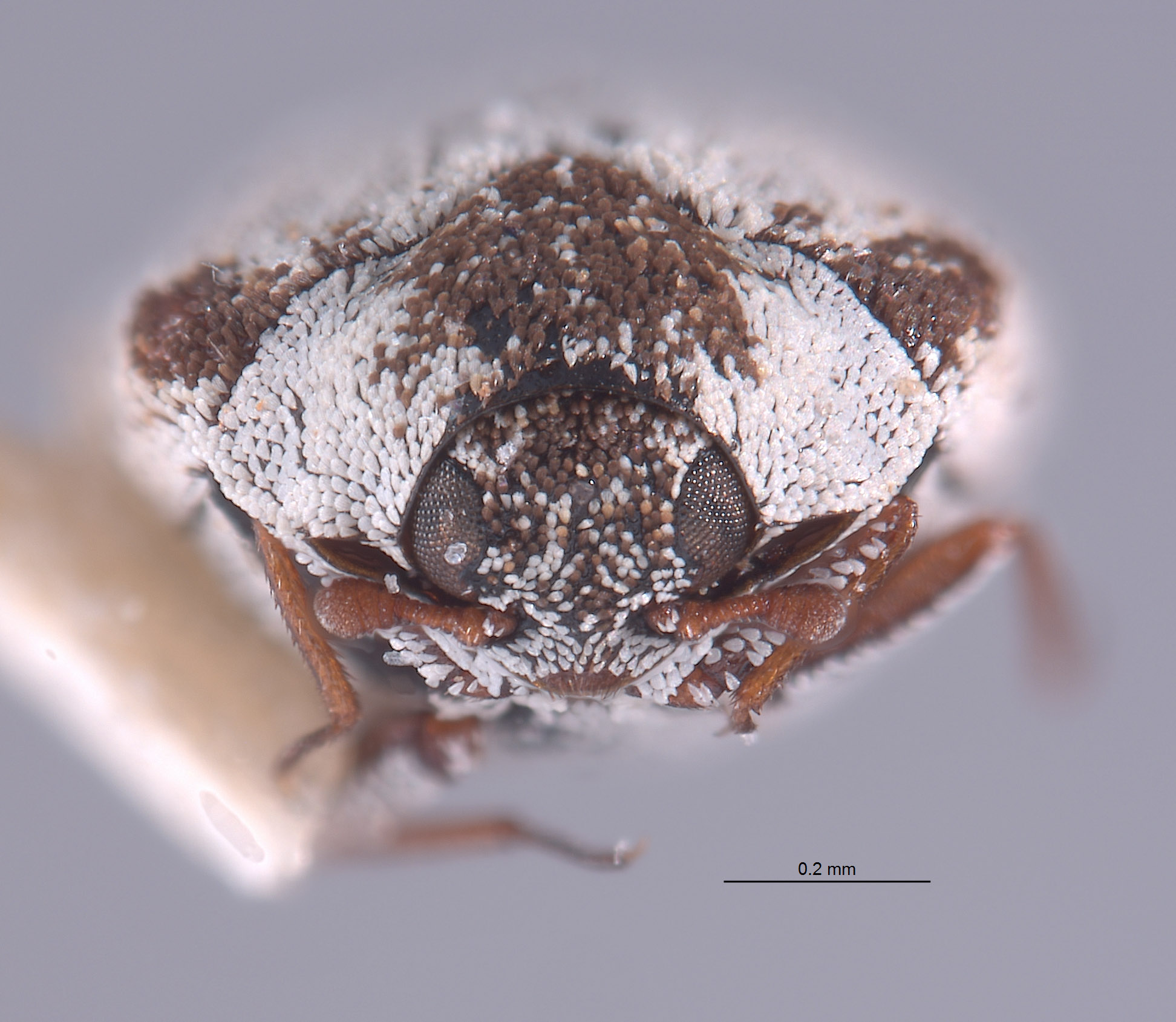
Adult A. umbra . Head view

== See also ==
- Anthrenus maculatus species group

Similar species:

- Anthrenus isabellinus, present on the east of United States. Fully covered in white scales in varieties
- Anthrenus omoi, present in North America
- Anthrenus chiton and Anthrenus thoracicus, from United States
