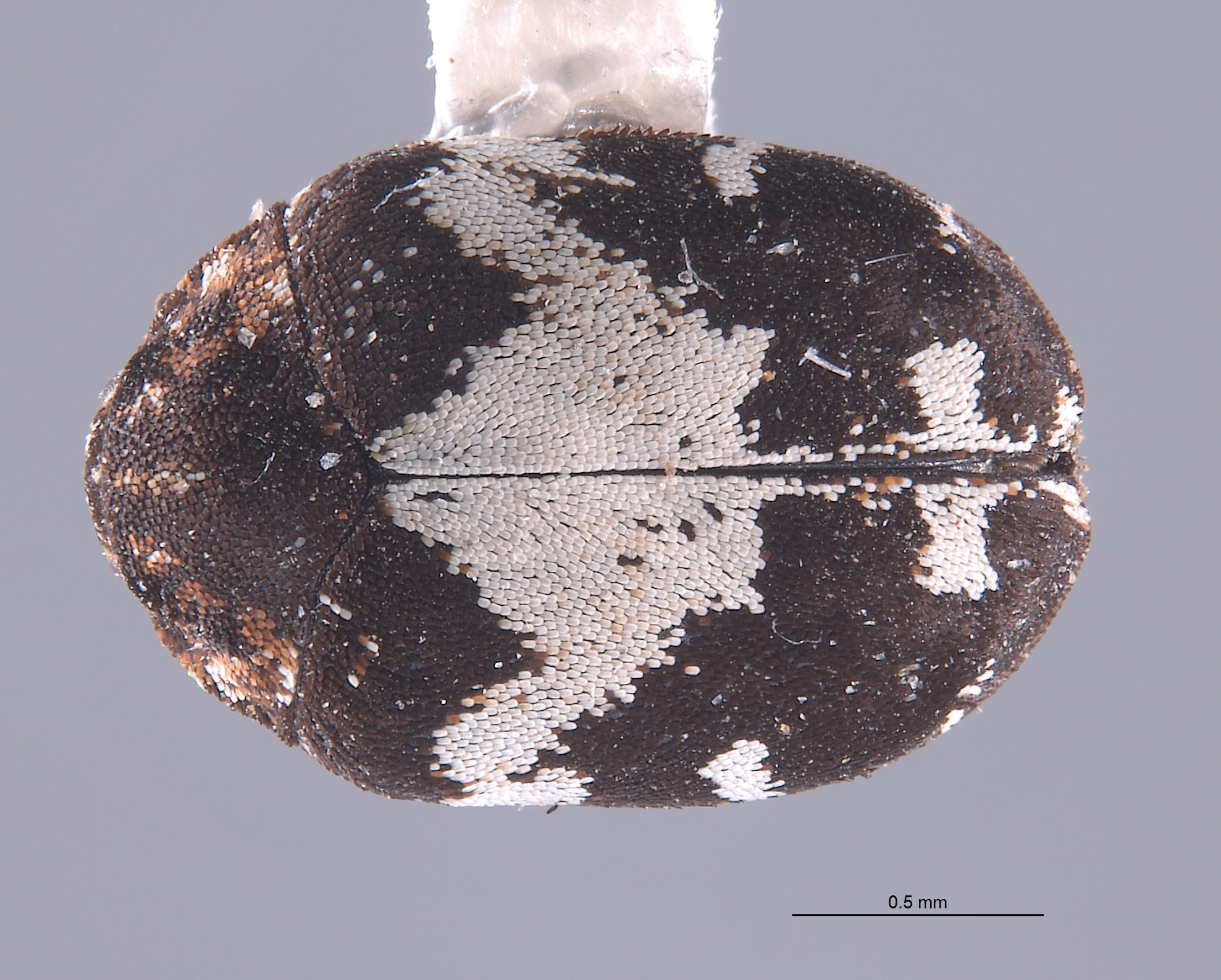
- Dorsal image
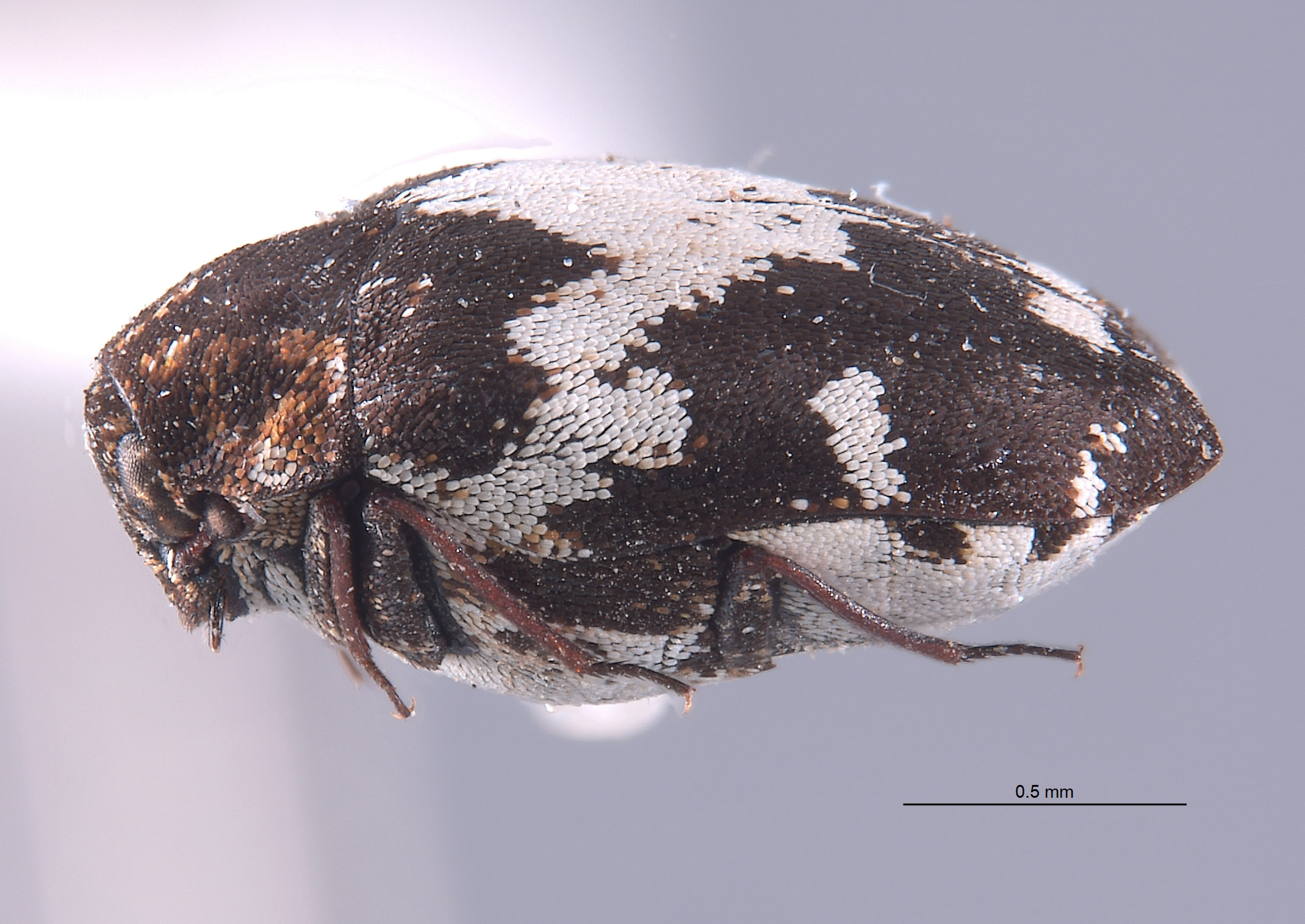
- Lateral image

Scientific classification
- Kingdom: Animalia
- Phylum: Arthropoda
- Class: Insecta
- Order: Coleoptera
- Suborder: Polyphaga
- Family: Dermestidae
- Tribe: Anthrenini
- Genus: Anthrenus
- Species: A. sophonisba

Binomial name
- Anthrenus sophonisba Beal, 1998

= Anthrenus sophonisba =

Species of beetle

Anthrenus sophonisba is a species of carpet beetle in the family Dermestidae. It is known from United States (Arizona, California, Idaho, Nevada, Utah).

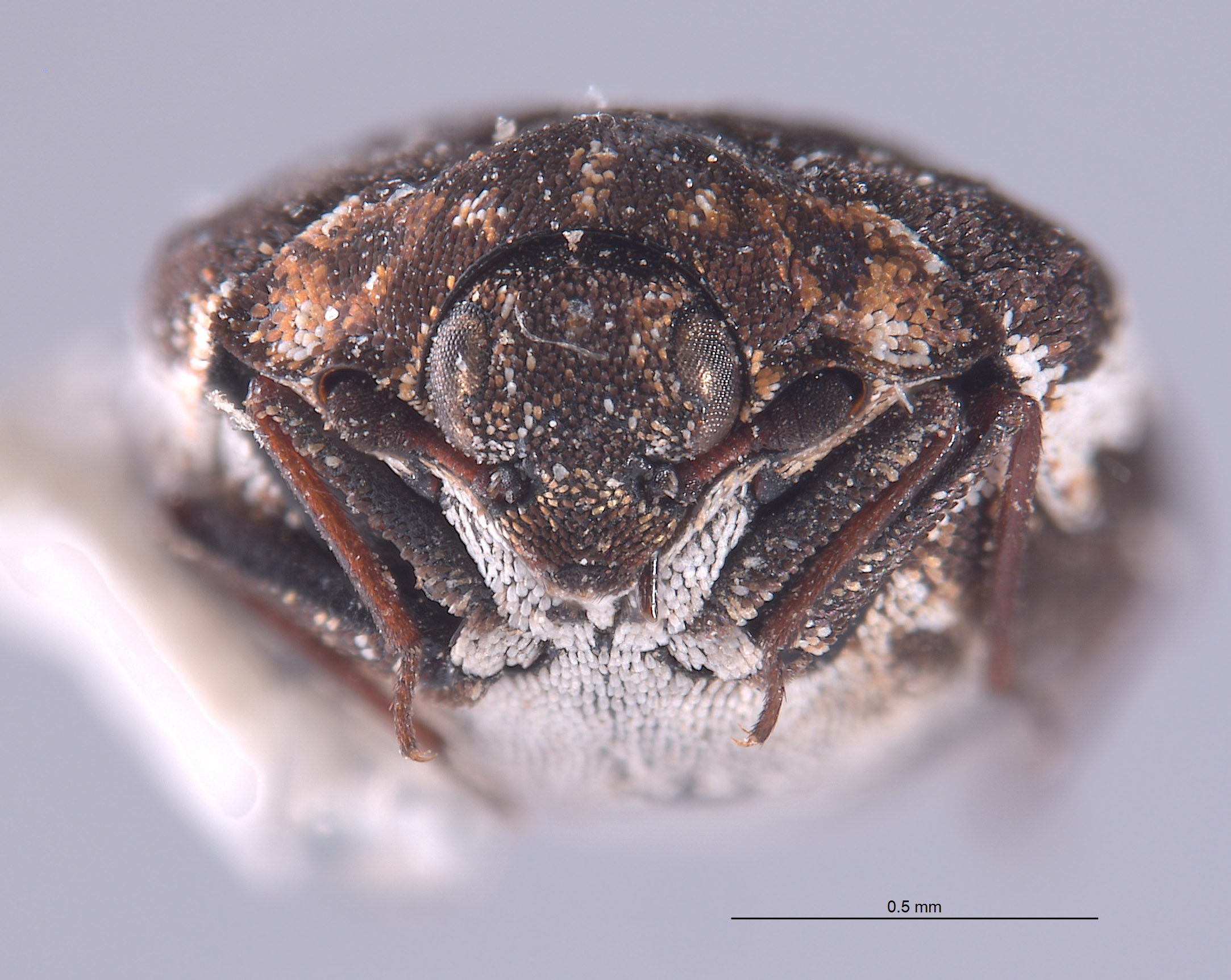
Adult A. sophonisba. Head view

== See also ==
- Anthrenus scrophulariae species group

Similar species:

- Anthrenus lepidus, from North America
- Anthrenus thoracicus and Anthrenus chiton, from United States
- Anthrenus scrophulariae, nearly cosmopolitan
