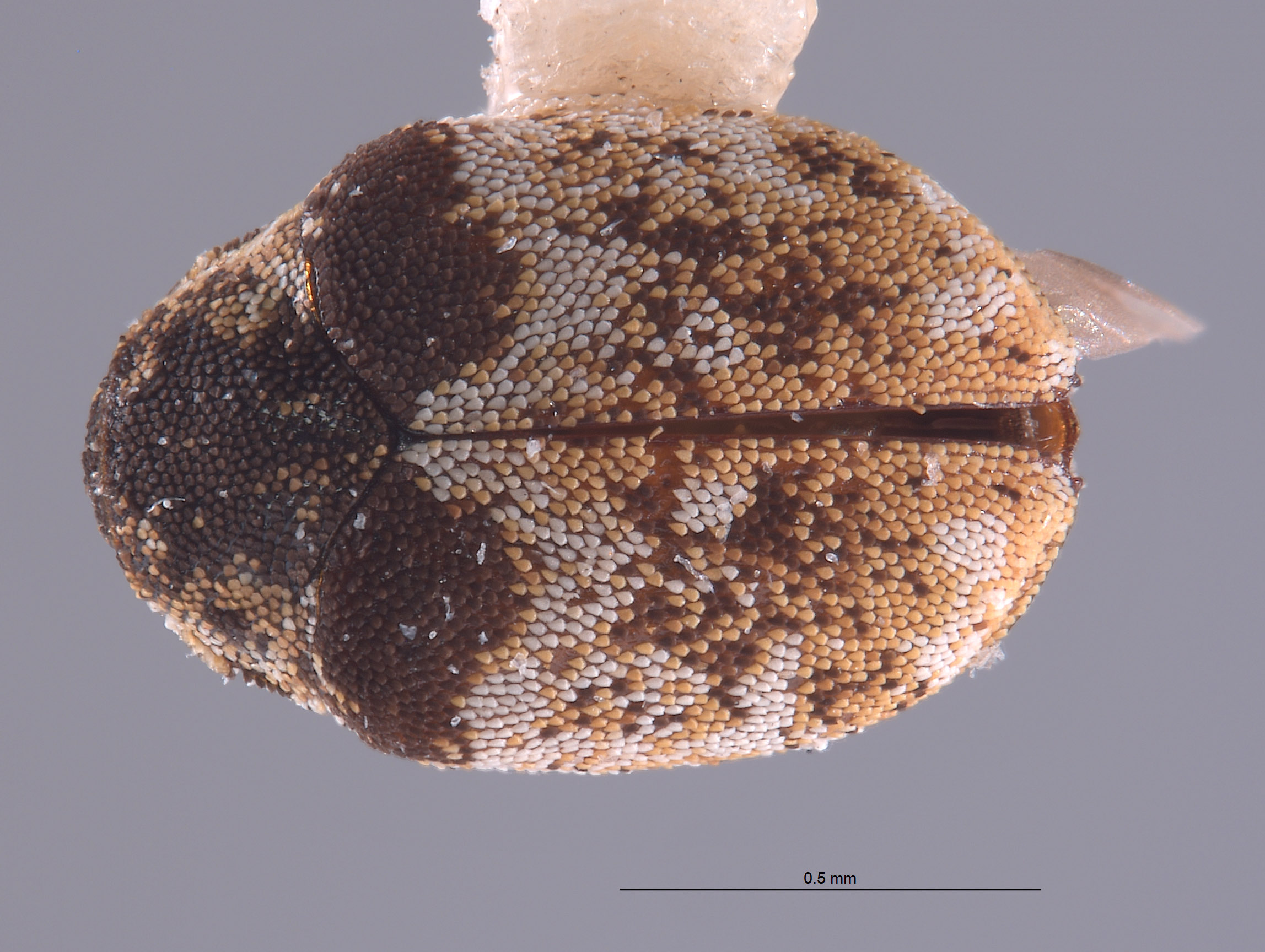
- Dorsal image
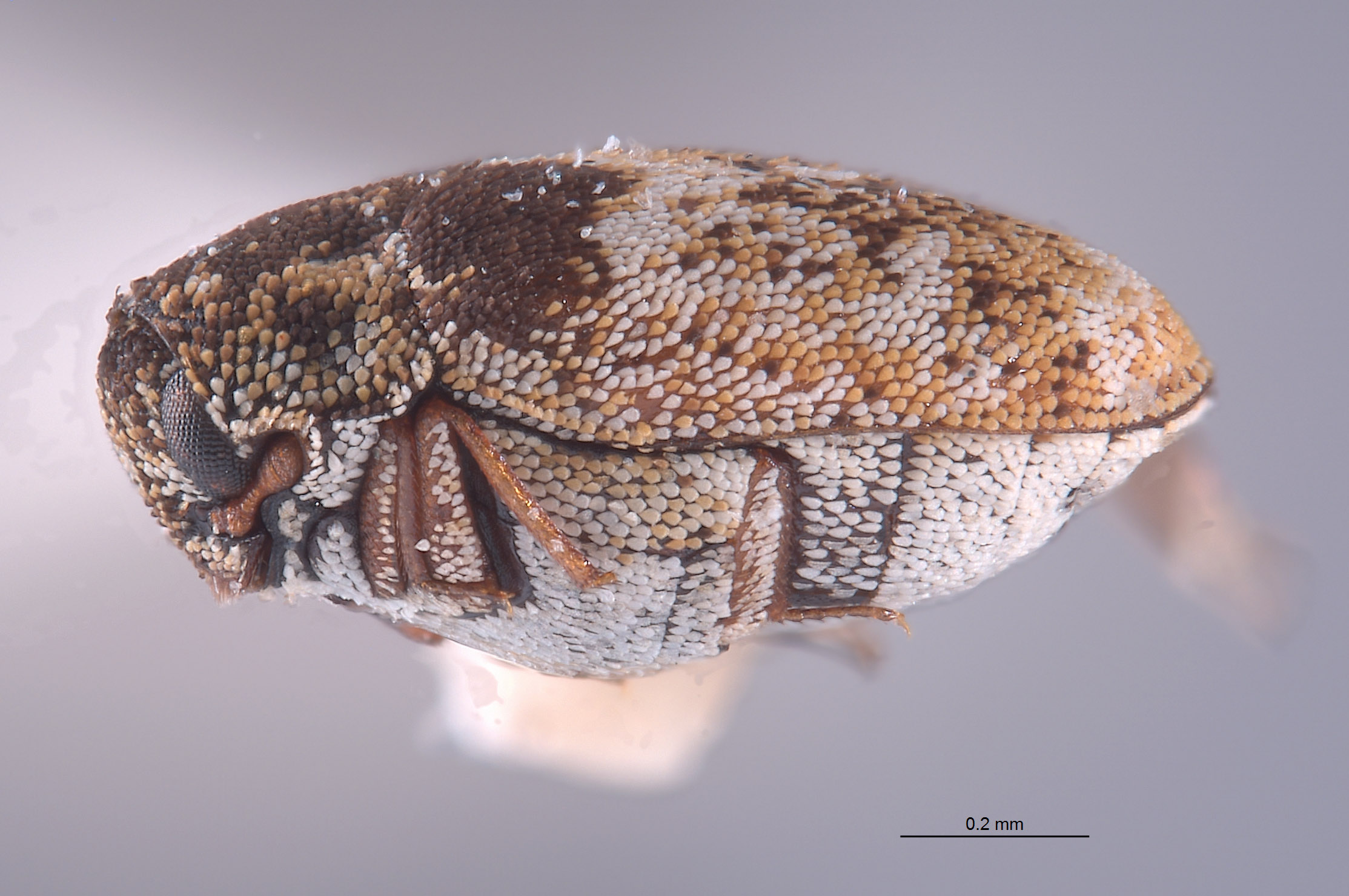
- Lateral image

Scientific classification
- Kingdom: Animalia
- Phylum: Arthropoda
- Clade: Pancrustacea
- Class: Insecta
- Order: Coleoptera
- Suborder: Polyphaga
- Family: Dermestidae
- Genus: Anthrenus
- Subgenus: Anthrenodes
- Species: A. omoi

Binomial name
- Anthrenus omoi Beal, 1998

= Anthrenus omoi =

Species of beetle

Anthrenus omoi is a species of carpet beetle in the subgenus Anthrenodes of the genus Anthrenus, family Dermestidae. It is known from Mexico (Sonora) and the United States (Arizona).

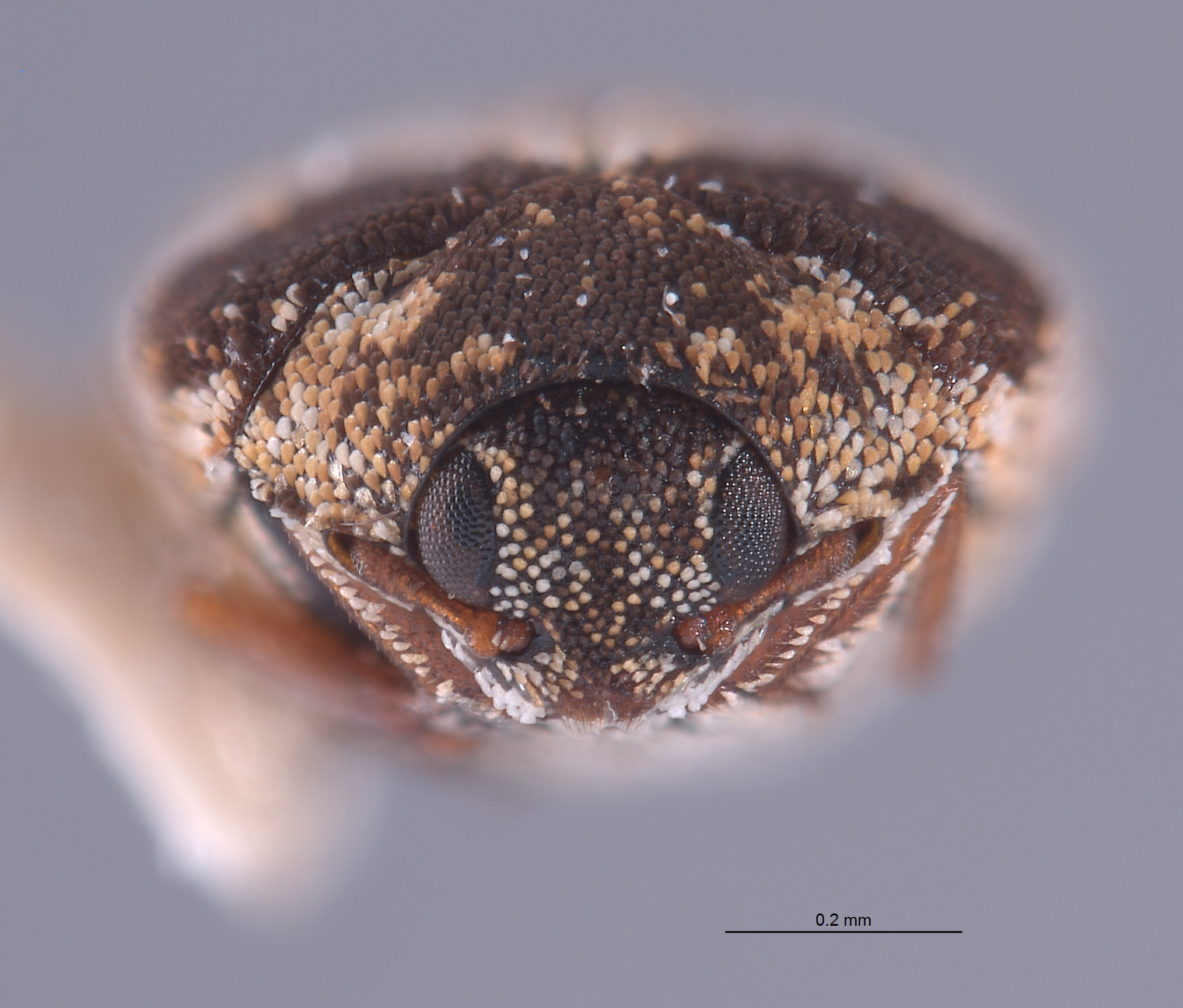
Adult A. omoi. Head view

== See also ==
Similar species:

- Anthrenus maculatus and Anthrenus umbra, present in North America
- Anthrenus isabellinus, present on the east of United States
- Anthrenus chiton and Anthrenus thoracicus, from United States
