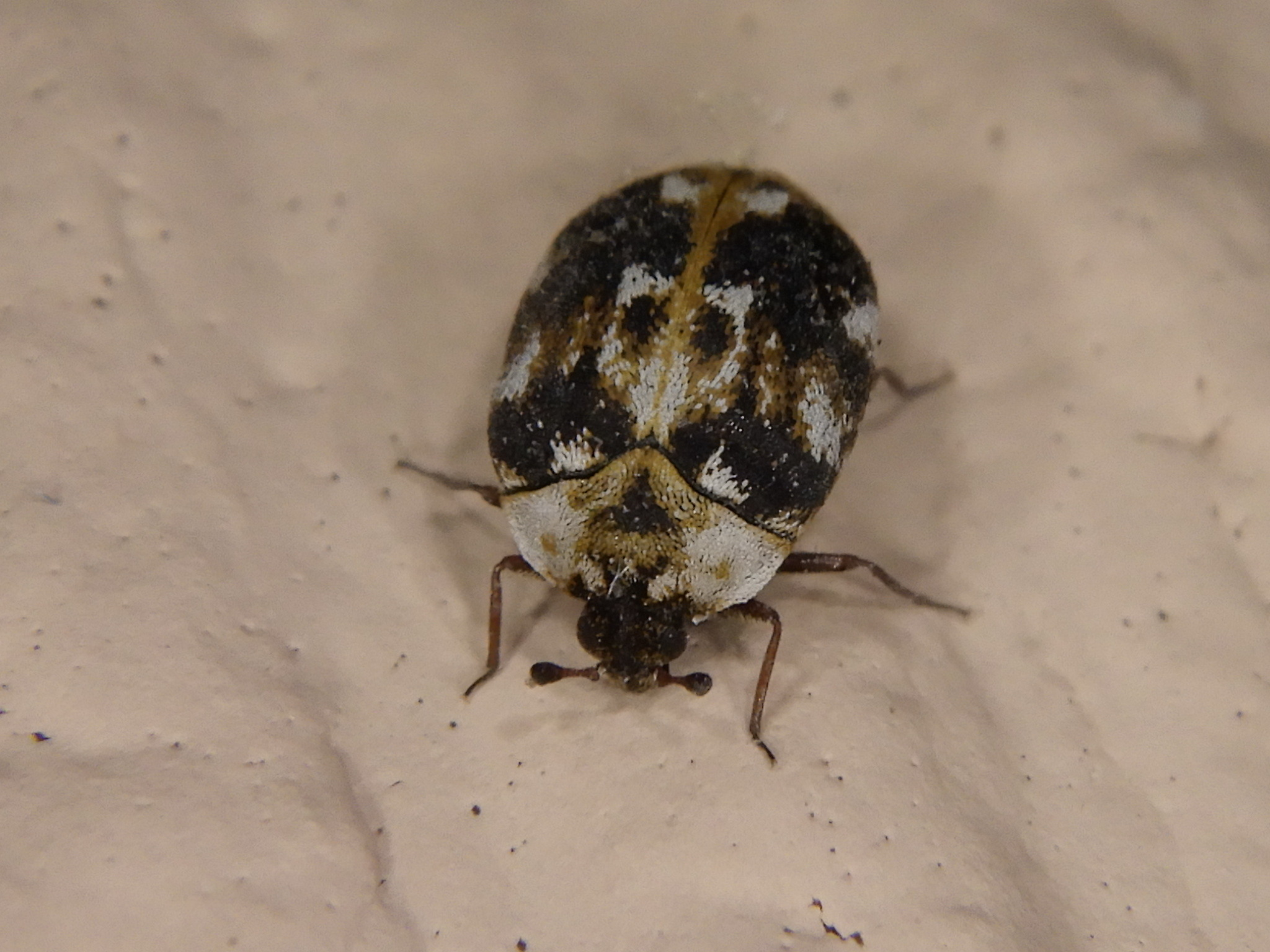

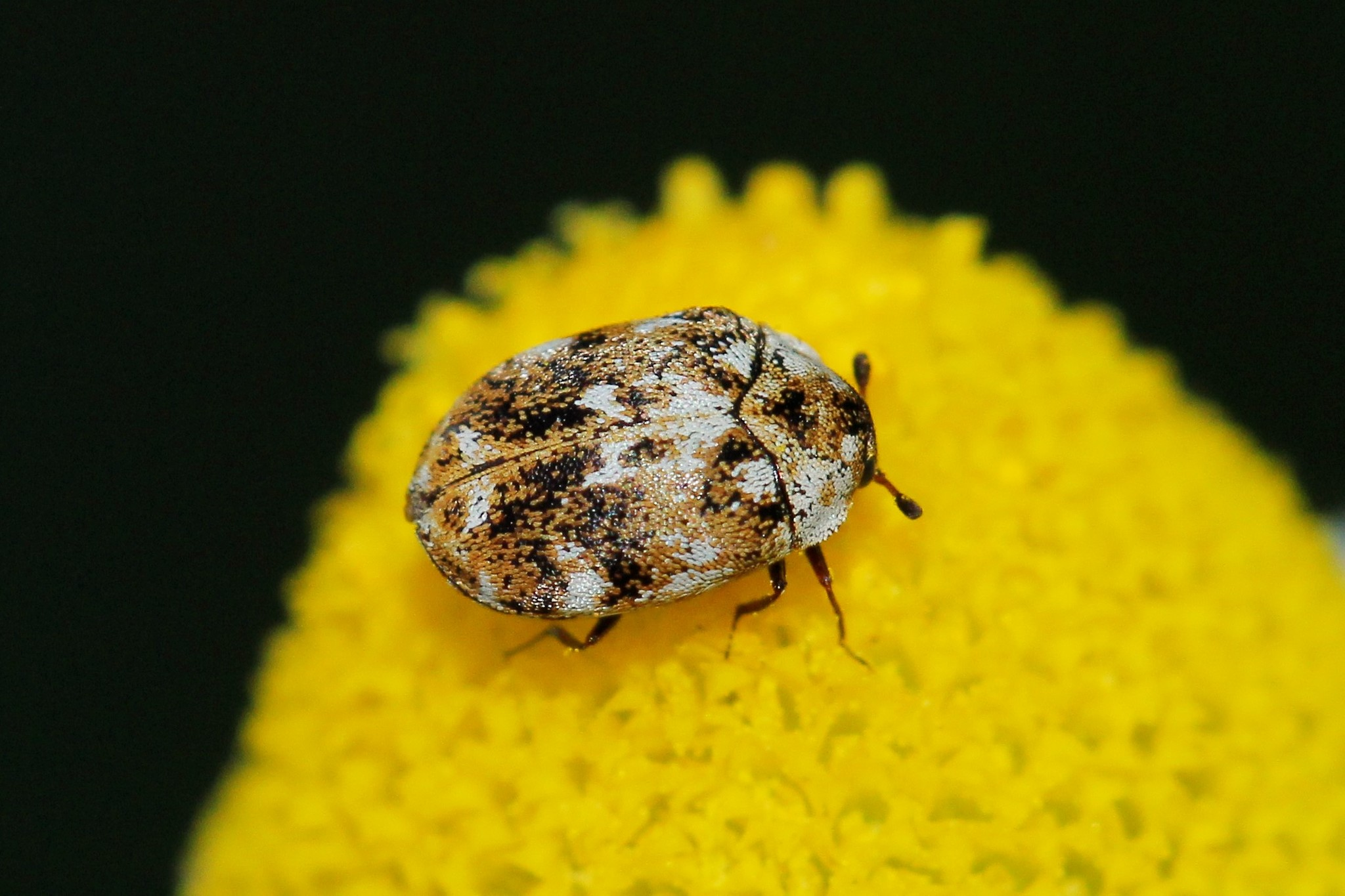

Scientific classification
- Kingdom: Animalia
- Phylum: Arthropoda
- Class: Insecta
- Order: Coleoptera
- Suborder: Polyphaga
- Family: Dermestidae
- Genus: Anthrenus
- Subgenus: Anthrenus
- Species: A. picturatus

Binomial name
- Anthrenus picturatus (Solsky, 1876)

Subspecies
- Anthrenus picturatus picturatus; Anthrenus picturatus arabicus; Anthrenus picturatus hintoni; Anthrenus picturatus melanoleucus

= Anthrenus picturatus =

Species of beetle

Anthrenus picturatus is a species of carpet beetle in the family Dermestidae. The species is usually known from regions of Russia, Eastern Europe and Asia (from Turkey to China).

Currently, 4 subspecies are being recognized with the following distribution:

- Anthrenus picturatus picturatus (Solsky, 1876) – Azerbaijan, Belarus, Georgia, Poland, Romania, Slovakia, Turkey; Afghanistan, Caucasus region, Iran, Kyrgyzstan, Kazakhstan, Russia, Tajikistan, Turkmenistan, Uzbekistan. Introduced to Corsica and South Africa (Pretoria)
- Anthrenus picturatus arabicus (Háva & Herrmann, 2006) – Yemen
- Anthrenus picturatus hintoni (Mroczkowski, 1952) – China (Beijing, Fujian, Inner Mongolia, Hebei, Hunan, Jiangxi, Liaoning, Qinghai, Shaanxi, Shandong, Sichuan, Xinjiang); Mongolia; Russia (Stavropol)
- Anthrenus picturatus melanoleucus (Solsky, 1876) – Afghanistan, Kazakhstan, Kyrgyzstan, Tajikistan, Uzbekistan

A subspecies Anthrenus picturatus makolskii (Mroczkowski, 1950) was previously recognized but it is now considered as synonym of Anthrenus picturatus picturatus.

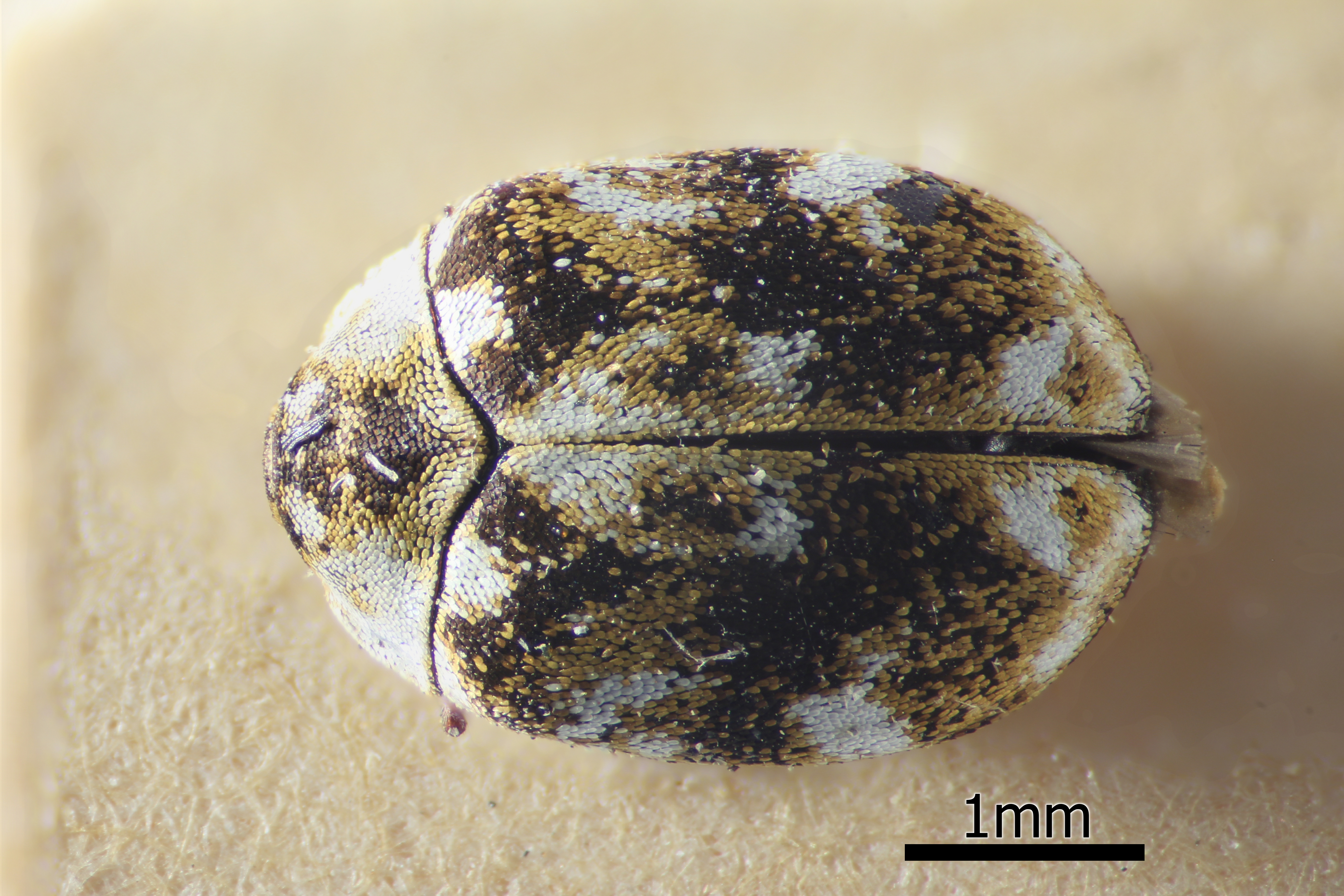
Anthrenus picturatus makolskii

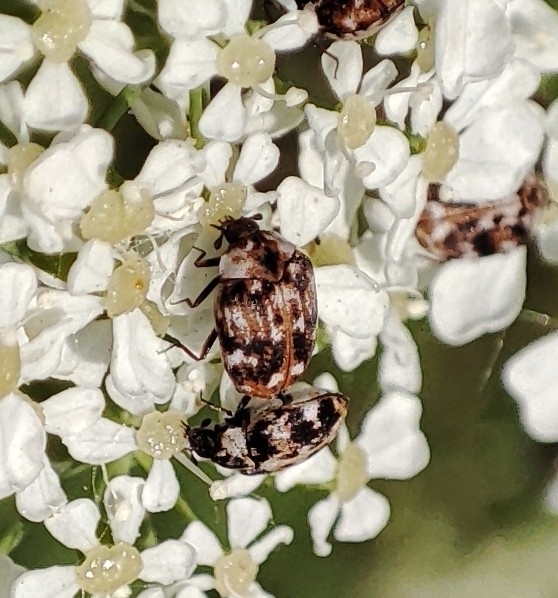
Beetles eating pollen

== See also ==
- Anthrenus scrophulariae species group

Similar species:

- Anthrenus kenyaensis and Anthrenus ethiopicus, from Africa
- Anthrenus scrophulariae, cosmopolitan
- Anthrenus lepidus, from North America
