= Anthrenus bilyi =

Scientific classification
- Kingdom: Animalia
- Phylum: Arthropoda
- Class: Insecta
- Order: Coleoptera
- Suborder: Polyphaga
- Family: Dermestidae
- Genus: Anthrenus
- Subgenus: Anthrenus
- Species: A. bilyi

Binomial name
- Anthrenus bilyi Háva, 2000

Synonyms
- Anthrenus montanus (Zhantiev, 2009)

Species of beetle

Anthrenus bilyi is a species of carpet beetle in the family Dermestidae. The species is known from Central Asia (Kyrgyzstan, Uzbekistan) and Armenia. It has close resemblance to common species, Anthrenus scrophulariae.

== See also ==
- Anthrenus scrophulariae species group
