= Anthrenus kenyaensis =

Scientific classification
- Kingdom: Animalia
- Phylum: Arthropoda
- Class: Insecta
- Order: Coleoptera
- Suborder: Polyphaga
- Family: Dermestidae
- Genus: Anthrenus
- Subgenus: Anthrenus
- Species: A. kenyaensis

Binomial name
- Anthrenus kenyaensis Háva, 2004

Species of beetle

Anthrenus (Anthrenus) kenyaensis is a species of carpet beetle found in Kenya, Namibia, and Tanzania.

== See also ==
- Anthrenus scrophulariae species group

Similar species:

- Anthrenus ethiopicus, from Africa
- Anthrenus picturatus, generally in Russia and Eastern Europe
- Anthrenus lepidus, from North America
