= Anthrenus ethiopicus =

Scientific classification
- Kingdom: Animalia
- Phylum: Arthropoda
- Class: Insecta
- Order: Coleoptera
- Suborder: Polyphaga
- Family: Dermestidae
- Genus: Anthrenus
- Subgenus: Anthrenus
- Species: A. ethiopicus

Binomial name
- Anthrenus ethiopicus Háva, 2004

Species of beetle

Anthrenus (Anthrenus) ethiopicus is a species of carpet beetle found in Ethiopia, Kenya, and South Africa.

== See also ==
- Anthrenus scrophulariae species group

Similar species:

- Anthrenus kenyaensis, from Africa
- Anthrenus lepidus, from North America
- Anthrenus festivus, Iberian Peninsula and North Africa
- Anthrenus miniopictus, from Spain and North Africa
