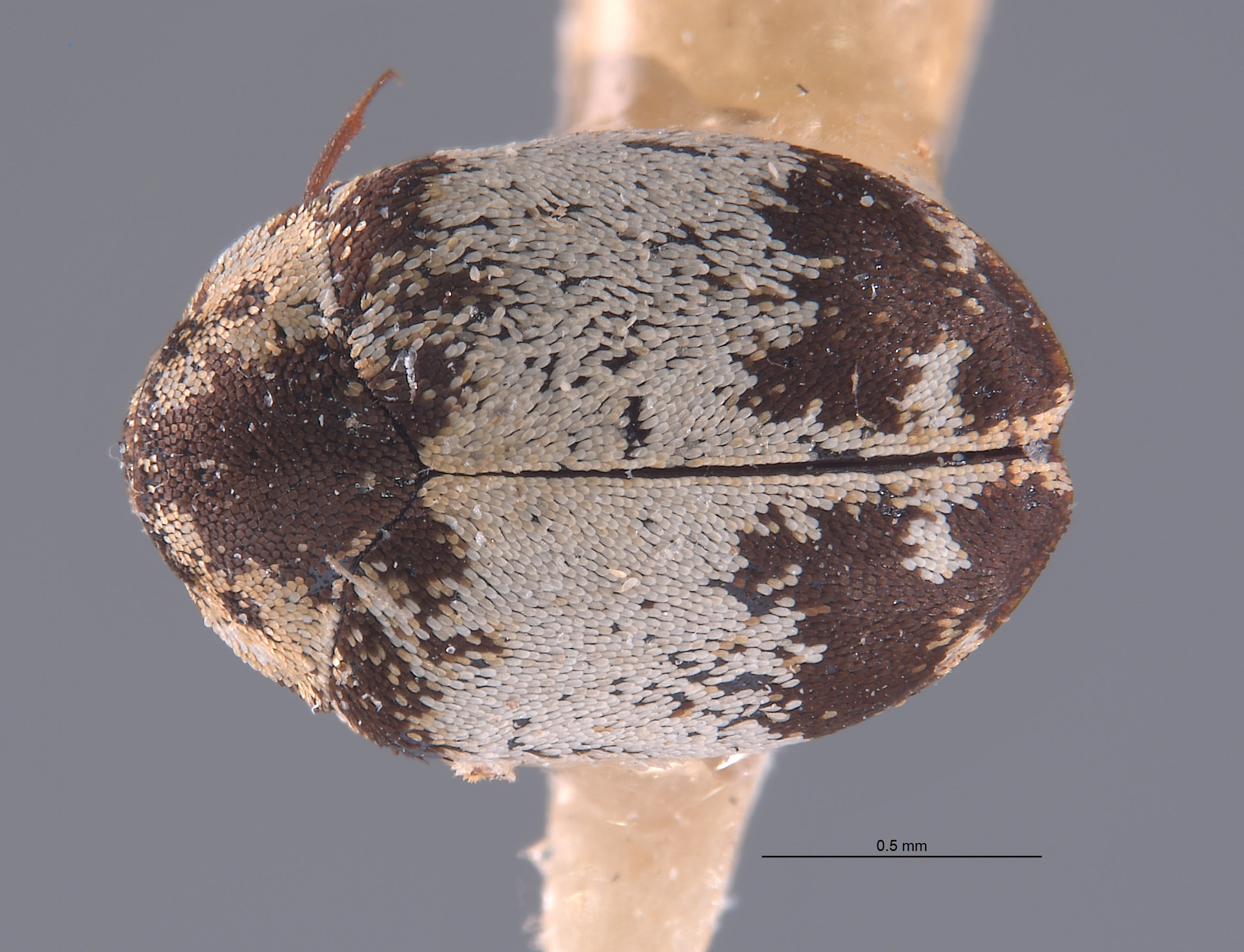
- Dorsal image
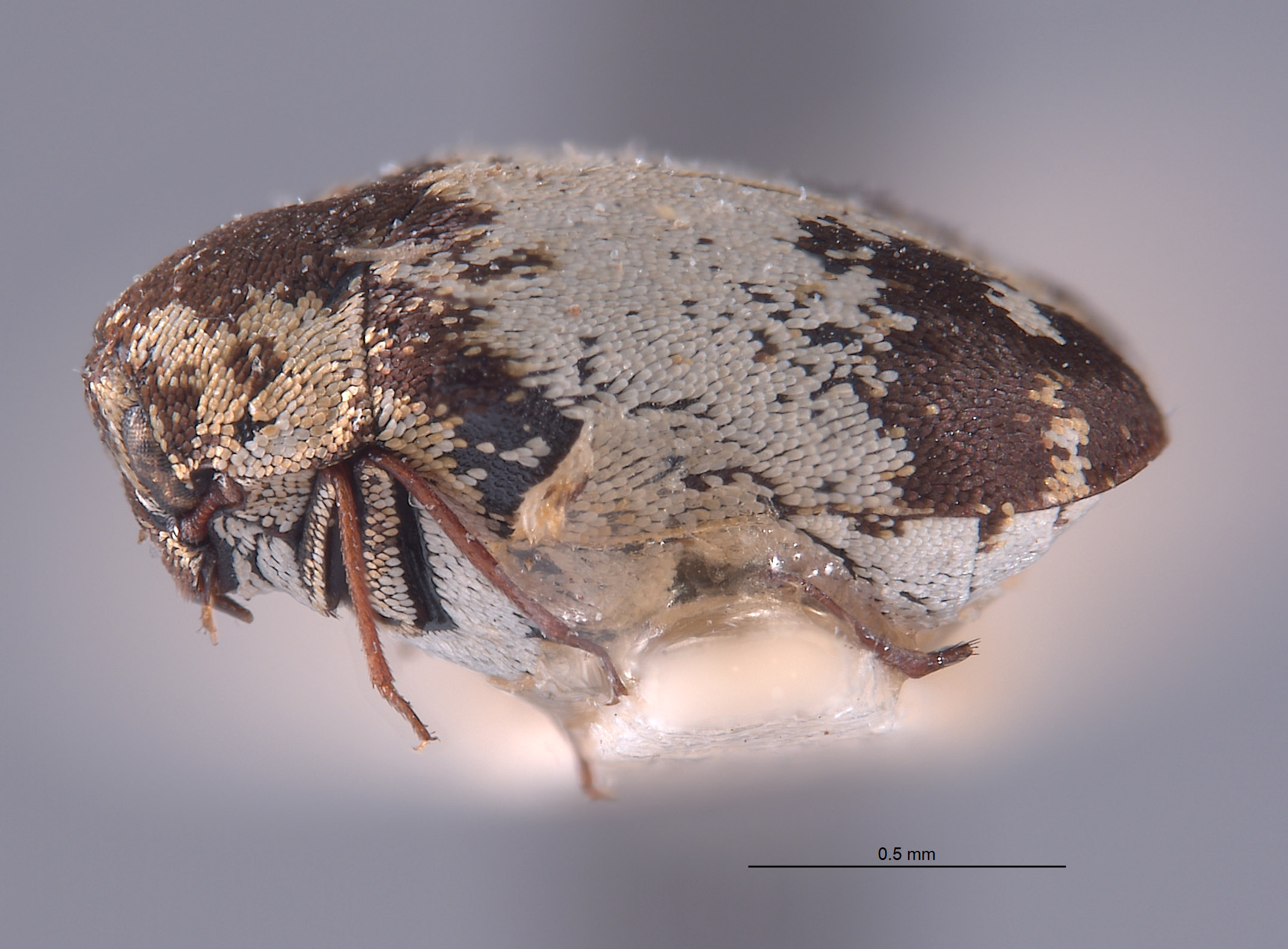
- Lateral image

Scientific classification
- Kingdom: Animalia
- Phylum: Arthropoda
- Class: Insecta
- Order: Coleoptera
- Suborder: Polyphaga
- Family: Dermestidae
- Genus: Anthrenus
- Subgenus: Anthrenus
- Species: A. chiton

Binomial name
- Anthrenus chiton Beal, 1998

= Anthrenus chiton =

Species of beetle

Anthrenus chiton is a species of carpet beetle in the subgenus Anthrenus of the genus Anthrenus, family Dermestidae. It is known from the United States (Arizona, California, Colorado, Texas).

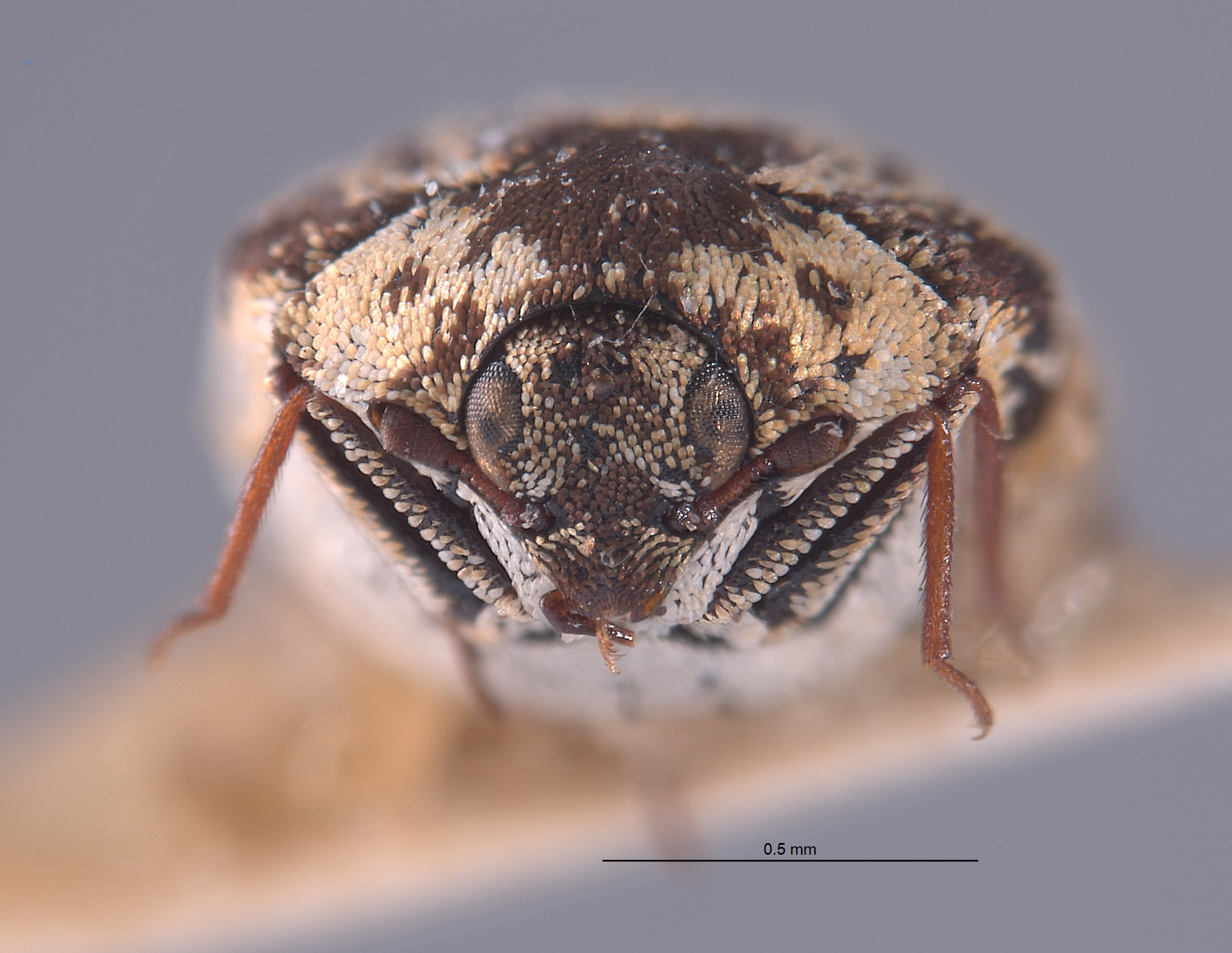
Adult A. chiton. Head view

== See also ==
- Anthrenus scrophulariae species group

Similar species:

- Anthrenus thoracicus, from United States
- Anthrenus omoi, from North America
- Anthrenus isabellinus, present on the east of United States
