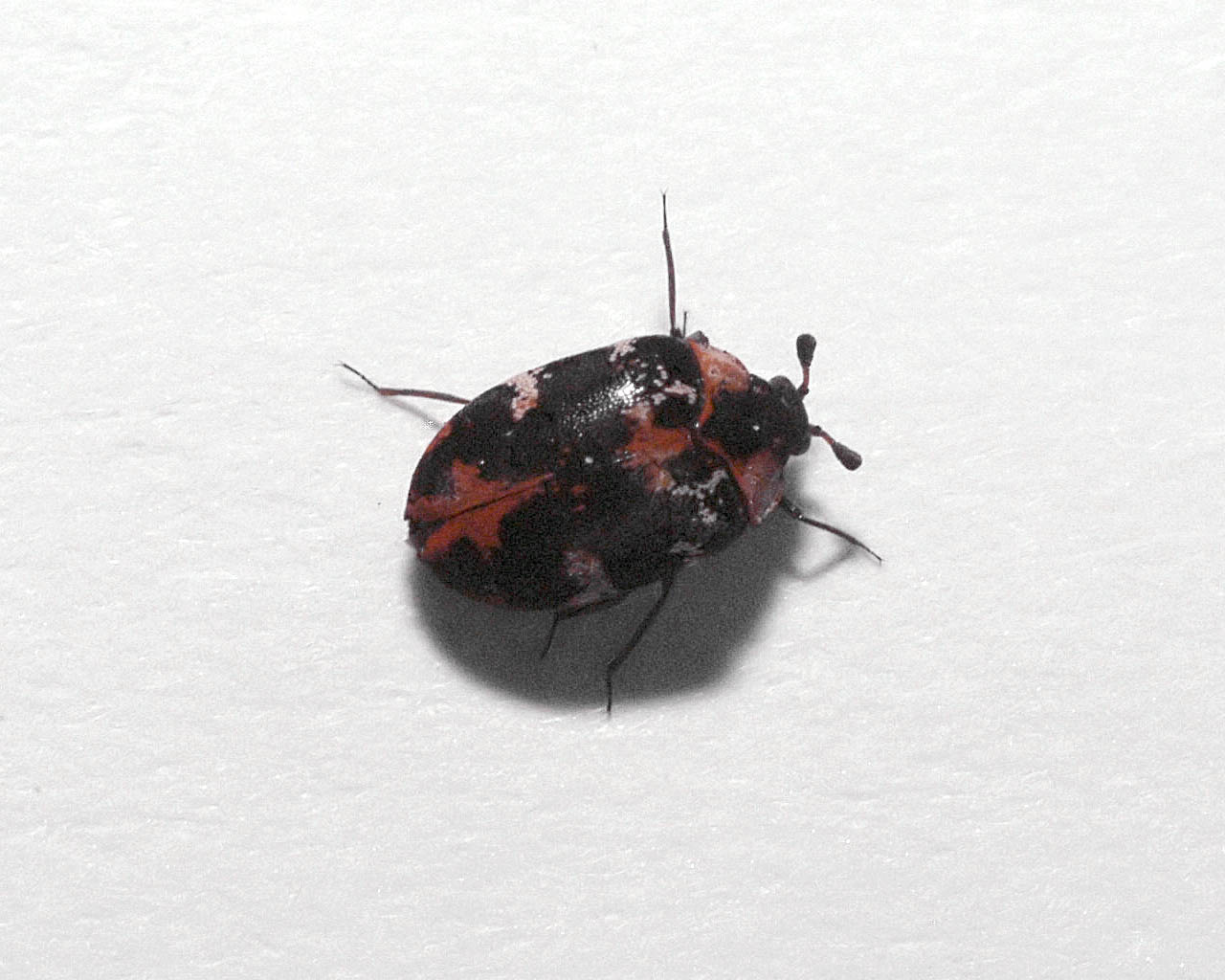

Scientific classification
- Kingdom: Animalia
- Phylum: Arthropoda
- Clade: Pancrustacea
- Class: Insecta
- Order: Coleoptera
- Suborder: Polyphaga
- Family: Dermestidae
- Genus: Anthrenus
- Subgenus: Anthrenus
- Species: A. scrophulariae

Binomial name
- Anthrenus scrophulariae (Linnaeus, 1758)

Subspecies
- Anthrenus scrophulariae scrophulariae; Anthrenus scrophulariae albidus

Synonyms
- Dermestes scrophulariae Linnaeus, 1758; Dermestes variegatus Scopoli, 1763; Byrrhus scrophulariae Linnaeus, 1767; Anthrenus histrio Fabricius, 1792; Anthrenus verbasci Herbst, 1797; Anthrenus scrophulariae ab. histrio: Heer, 1841; Anthrenus scrophulariae var. albida Dalla Torre, 1879; Anthrenus scrophulariae var. flavida Dalla Torre, 1879

= Anthrenus scrophulariae =

Species of beetle

Anthrenus (Anthrenus) scrophulariae, also known as the common carpet beetle or buffalo carpet beetle, is a species of beetle originally found in Europe, the Middle East and the Nearctic, which has now spread to most of the world. Adult beetles feed on pollen and nectar, but the larvae feed on animal fibres and can be damaging pests to carpets, fabrics and museum specimens.

== Description ==
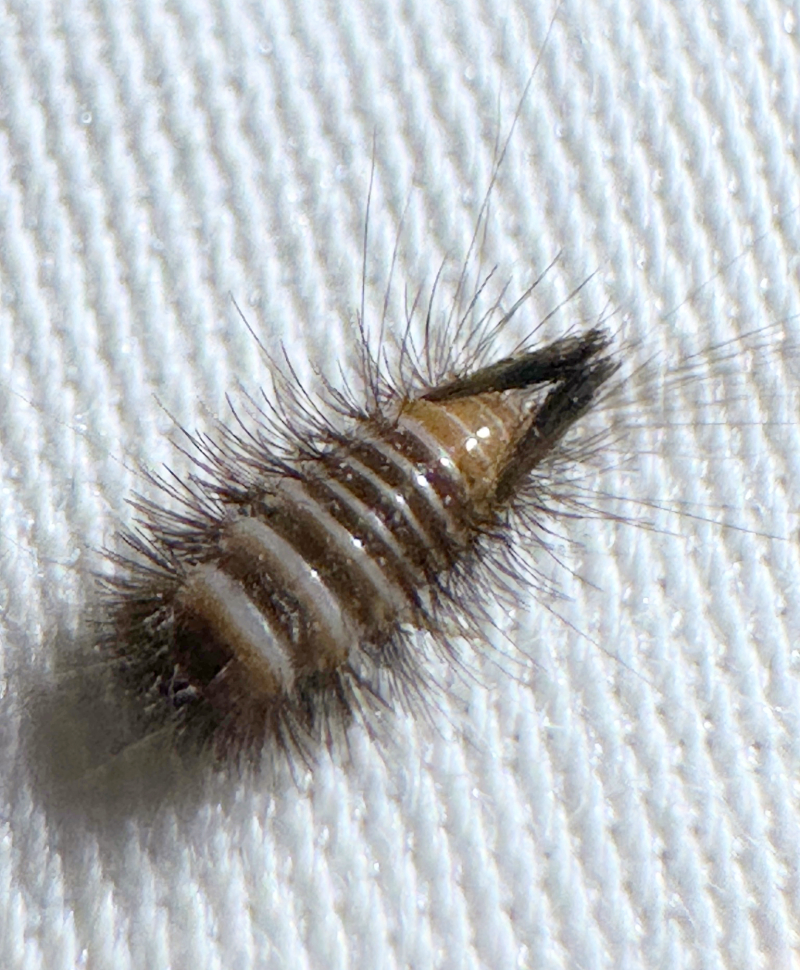
Larva

The adult common carpet beetle varies from about 2.5 to 3.8 mm (0.10 to 0.15 in) in length. The antennae have eleven segments, three of which form a club, and the eyes are notched at the front. The head is black but is largely concealed under the prothorax, which is also black, liberally speckled with white scales apart from a band in the centre. The elytra (wing cases) are black with orange or reddish scales near the midline and variable but symmetric patches of white scales elsewhere. As the beetle gets older, the scales tend to get rubbed off so the beetle changes in appearance. The small white eggs are laid in batches of 30 to 60 and have projections which help them to adhere to carpet fibres. The larvae are brown and moult five times before pupating; the final instar larva is hairy and larger than the adult beetle. Pupation takes place in the last larval skin.

== Distribution ==
The common carpet beetle originated in the Palaearctic region, but has been widely introduced elsewhere, now being present in most parts of the world. However, it is more common in temperate parts of the northern hemisphere and less common in the tropics and humid regions.

== Life cycle ==
Adult beetles feed on pollen and nectar, usually selecting white or whitish flowers such as buckwheat, wild aster, daisy, Spiraea and Ceanothus. This diet encourages mating and egg-laying, and the females seek out suitable locations with animal hairs or fibres for ovipositing; these include bird and animal nests, bee hives and the skins of dead animals, as well as indoor sites such as carpets, upholstery, fabrics or preserved animal material. The eggs hatch in two to three weeks, and the larvae chew at whatever animal fibres they find in their environment. After about two months the larvae pupate and the adult insects emerge about a month later and, if indoors, make their way into the open air.

== Control ==
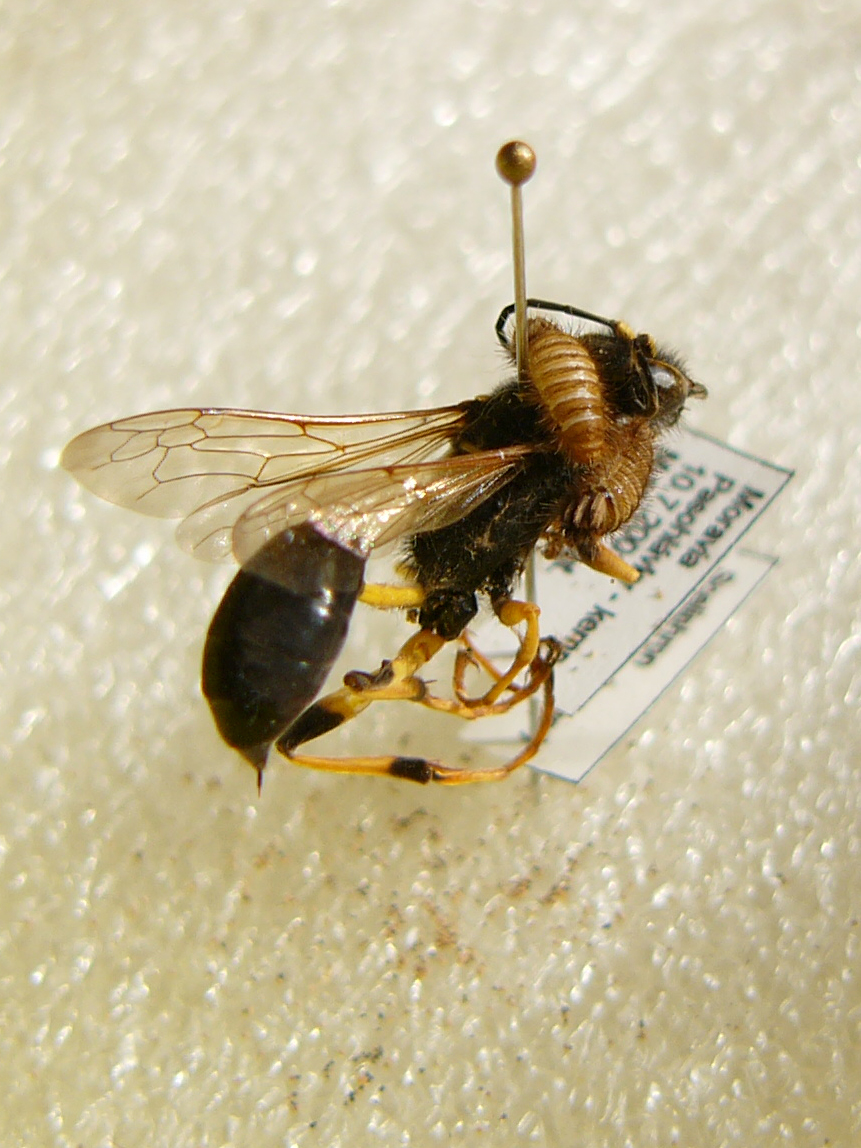
Larvae of a carpet beetle feeding on a wasp in an insect collection

When the eggs are laid on carpets and household fabrics, the larvae feed on the animal fibres and make holes in the materials. Exhibits in museums may be eaten away, leaving a powdering of fine dust round dried insects in collections; herbarium specimens may also be consumed. Human skin that comes into contact with the discarded larval skins may develop dermatitis. Good hygiene and regular vacuuming may prevent infestations from happening. Small items can be placed in airtight containers to keep the beetles out, and both heat and cold treatments are effective against the larvae and eggs. In enclosed spaces, mothballs can be placed as a repellent. Chemical treatments are possible but may not reach all the recesses where the insects lurk, and fumigation may be necessary in extreme cases.

== Variation ==
The species shows notable variation in certain regions of the world, with forms ranging from the common Anthrenus scrophulariae scrophulariae, which has predominantly black scales with orange or red scales near the suture, to the entirely white Anthrenus scrophulariae albidus, regarded as either a subspecies or variation.

The albidus form occurs across a range that extends from Southeastern Europe (Croatia to Romania, and more south to Greece) through Turkey and is also reported from the Caucasus region, Syria and Uzbekistan.

Images of Anthrenus scrophulariae and its variants (Note: Variants rubricollis and suecicus are also considered synonyms of subspecies Anthrenus scrophulariae scrophulariae; variants gravidus and senex - of subspecies Anthrenus scrophulariae albidus.)
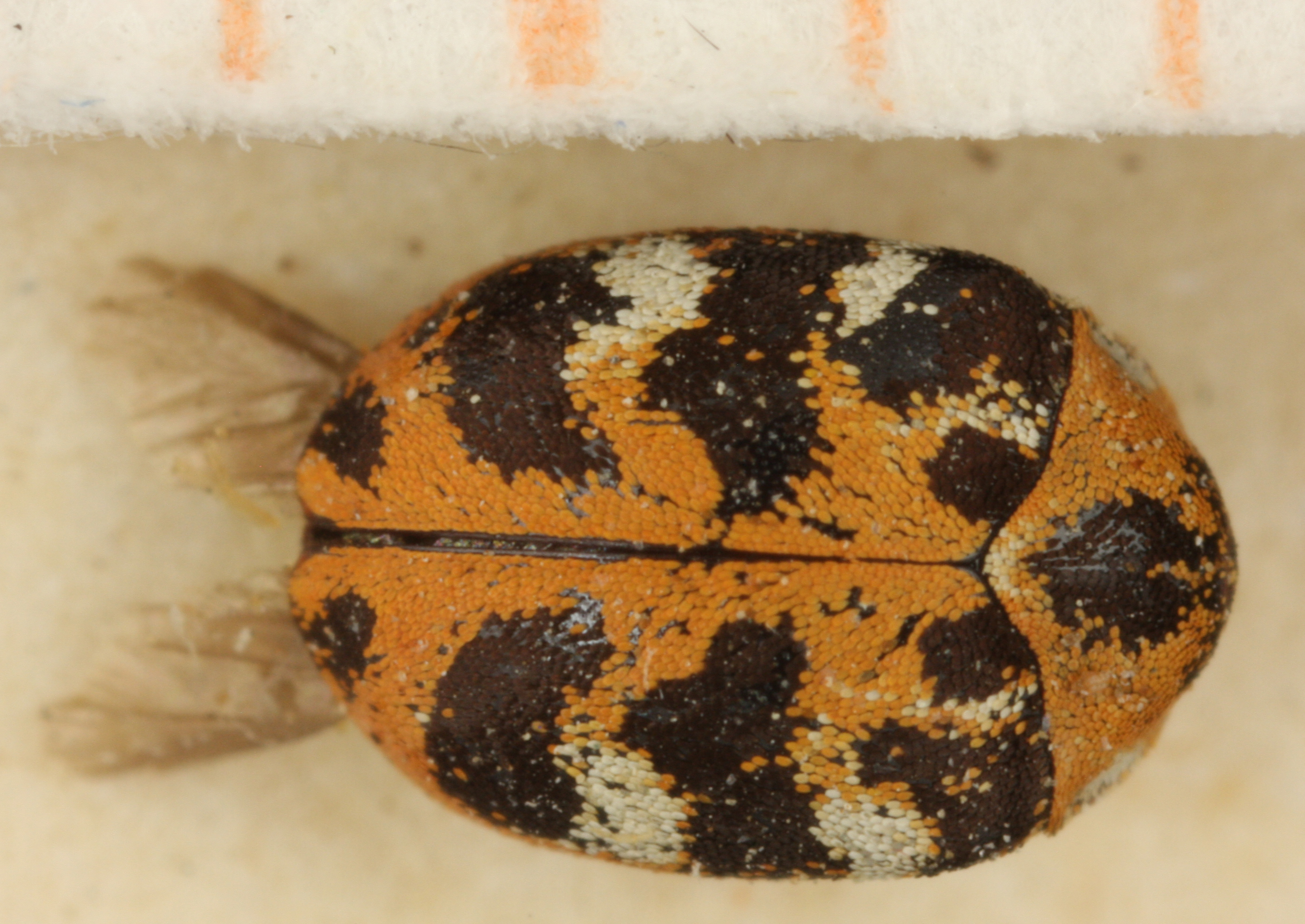
A. scrophulariae var. rubricollis

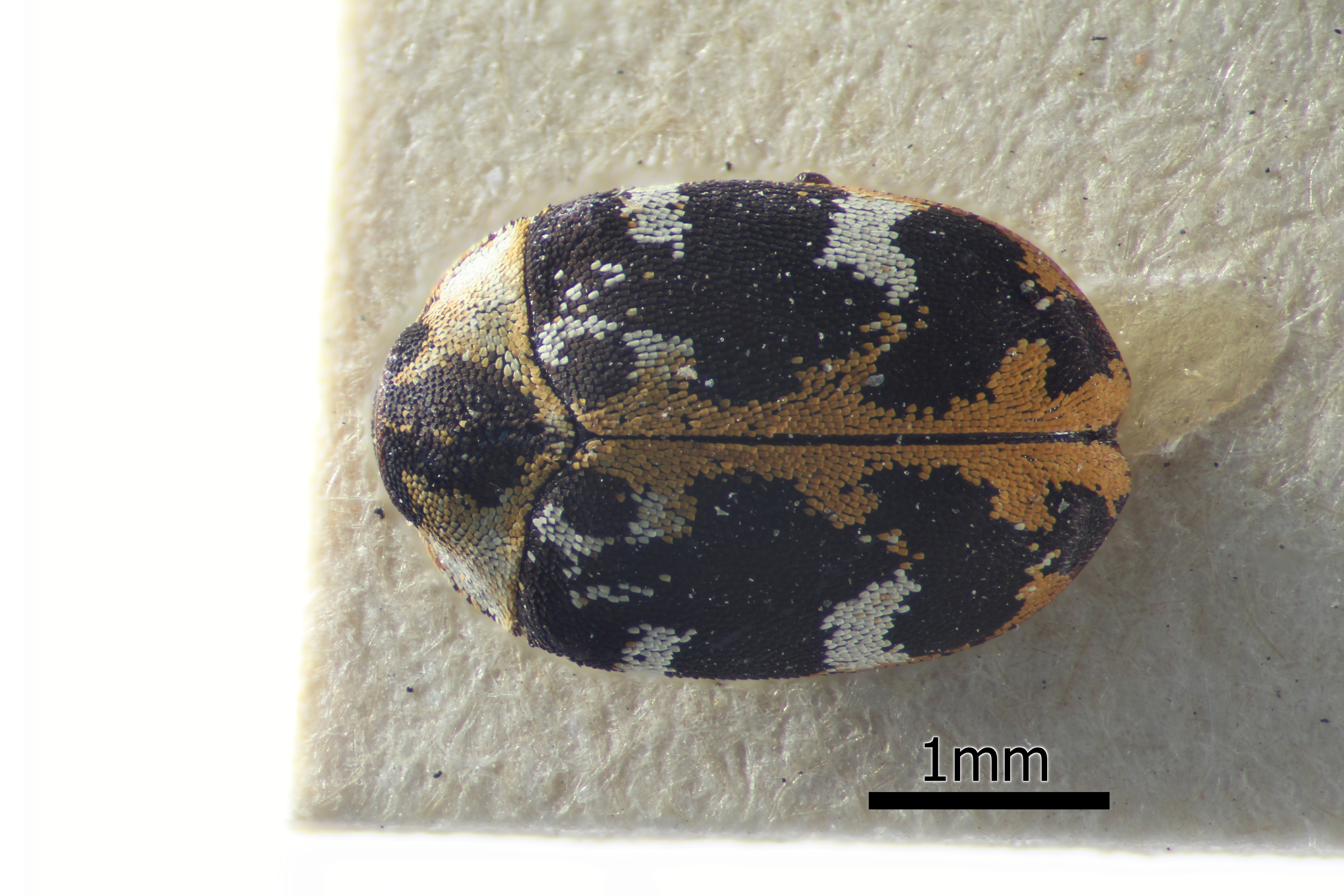
A. scrophulariae ssp. scrophulariae

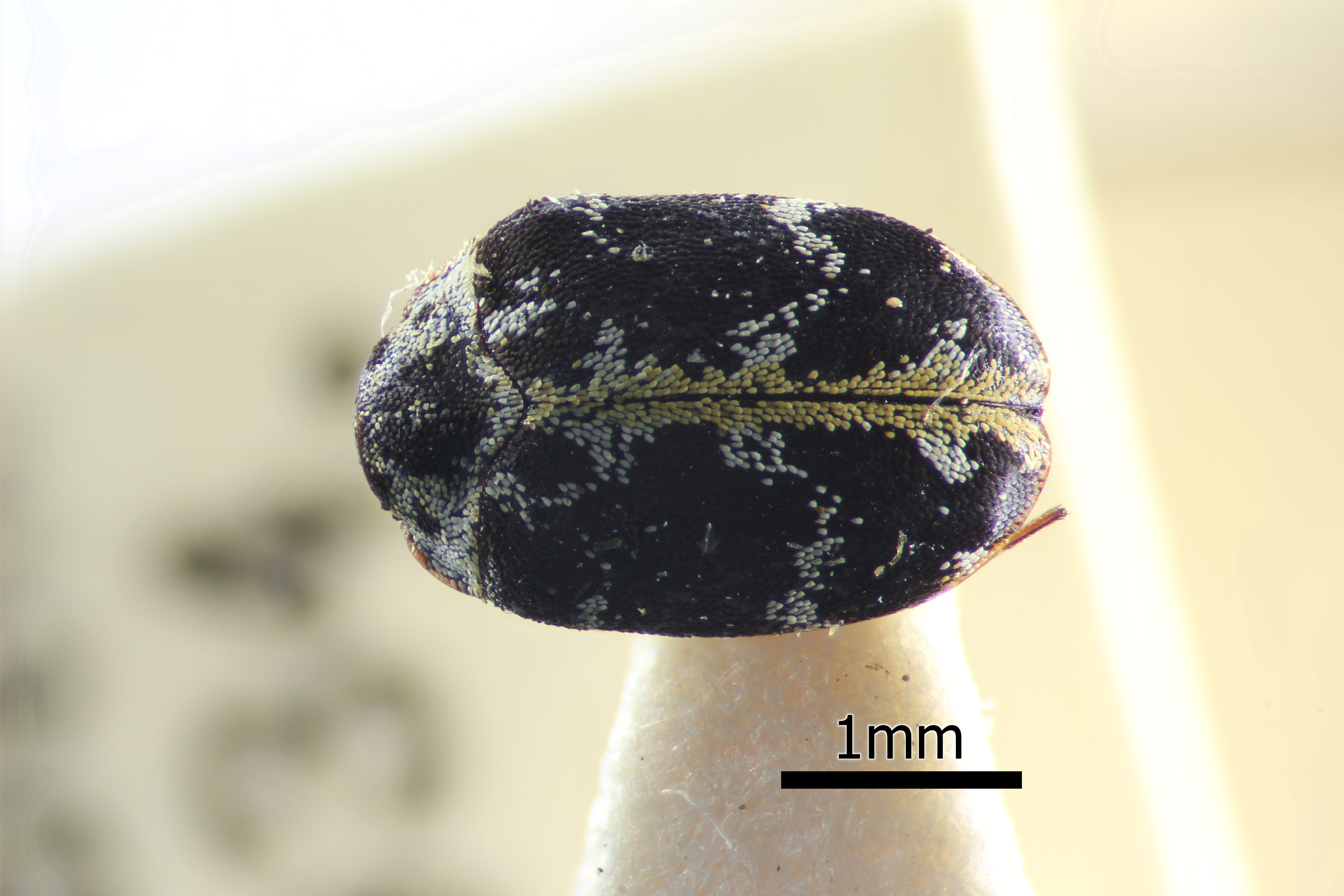
A. scrophulariae var. suecicus

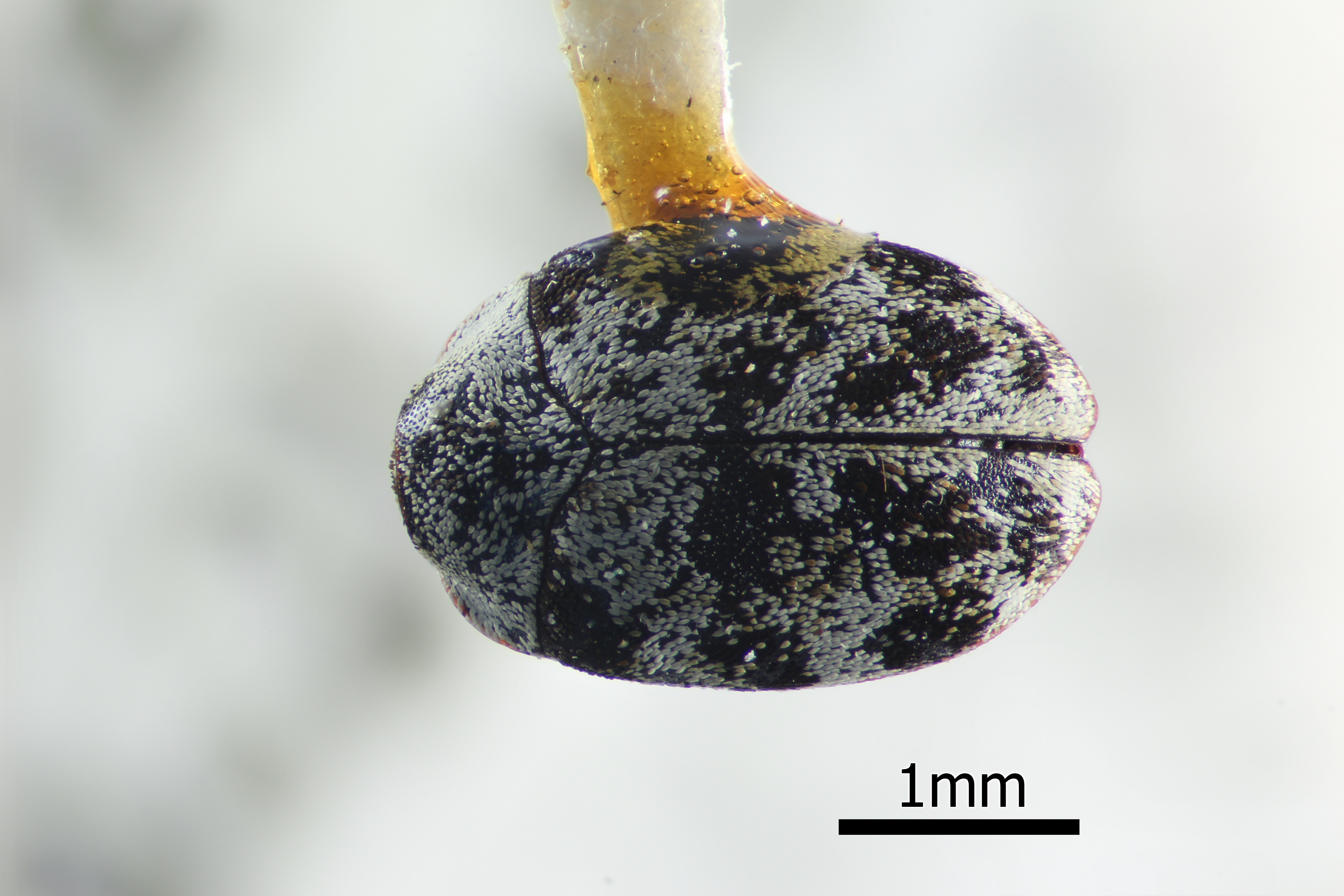
A. scrophulariae var. gravidus

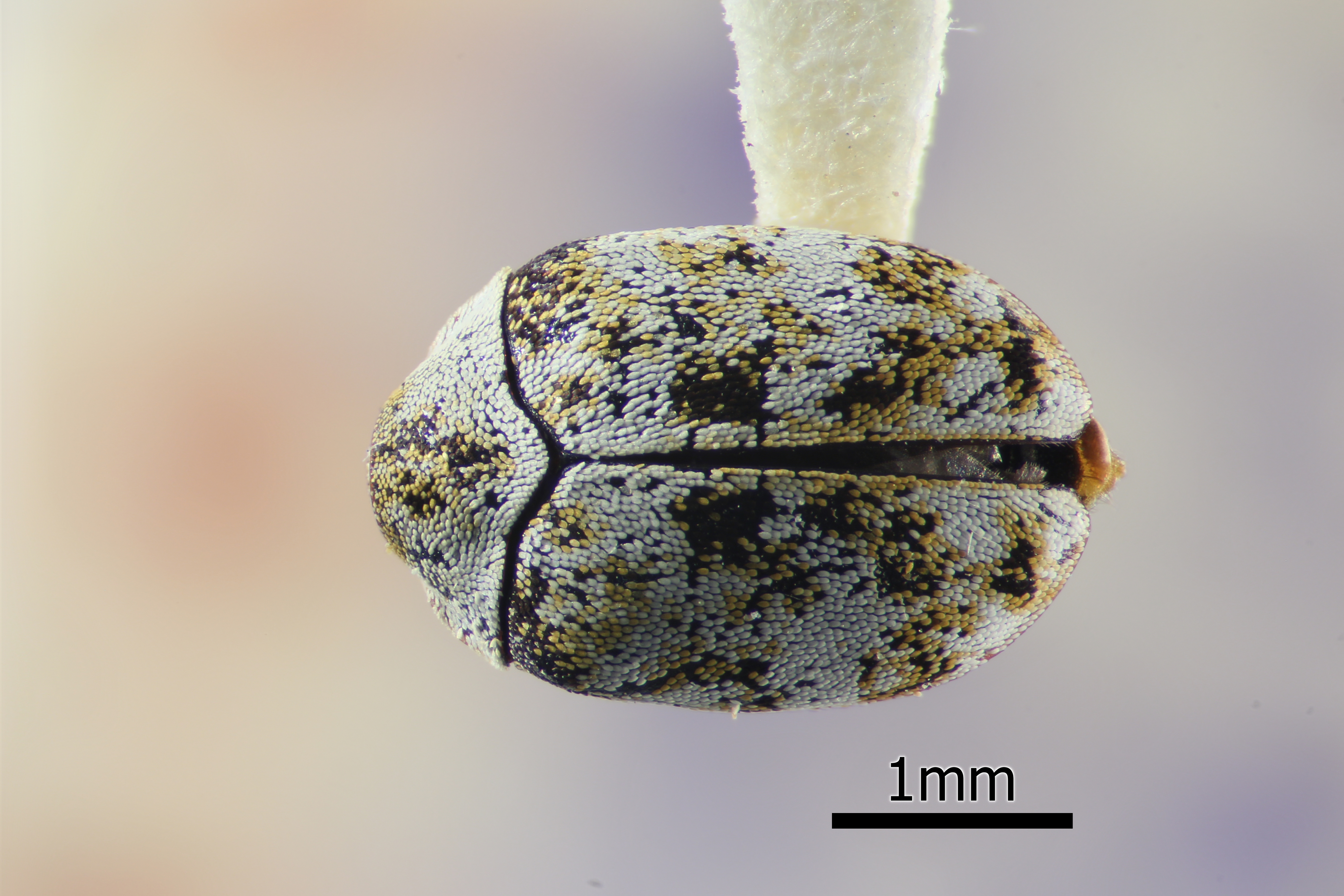
A. scrophulariae var. gravidus

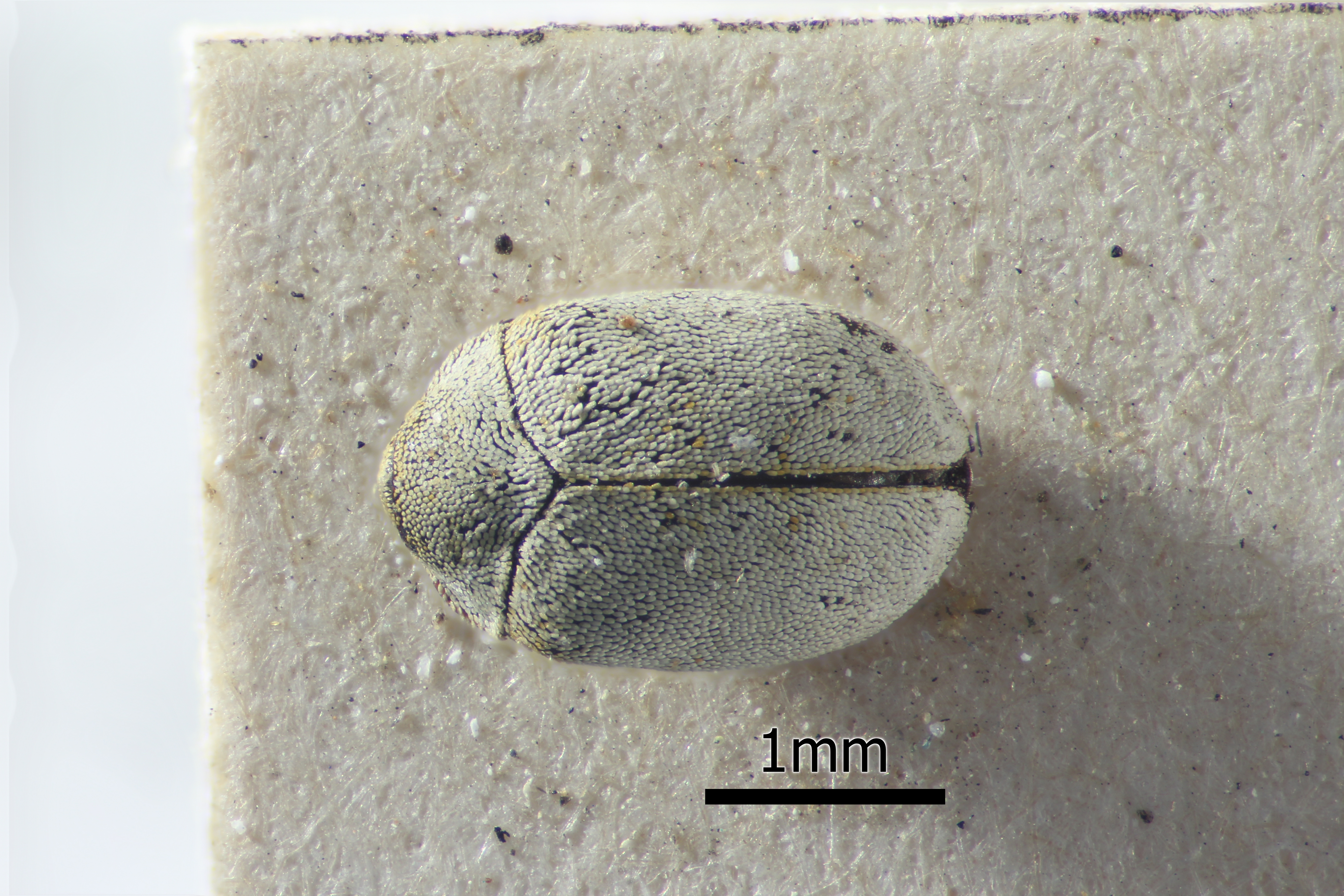
A. scrophulariae var. senex (or var. albidus)

== See also ==
- Anthrenus scrophulariae species group

Similar species:

- Anthrenus thoracicus, from United States
- Anthrenus bilyi, from Central Asia and Armenia
- Anthrenus miniopictus, from Spain and North Africa

Sometimes could also be confused with:

- Anthrenus lepidus, from United States
- Anthrenus picturatus, generally in Russia and Eastern Europe
