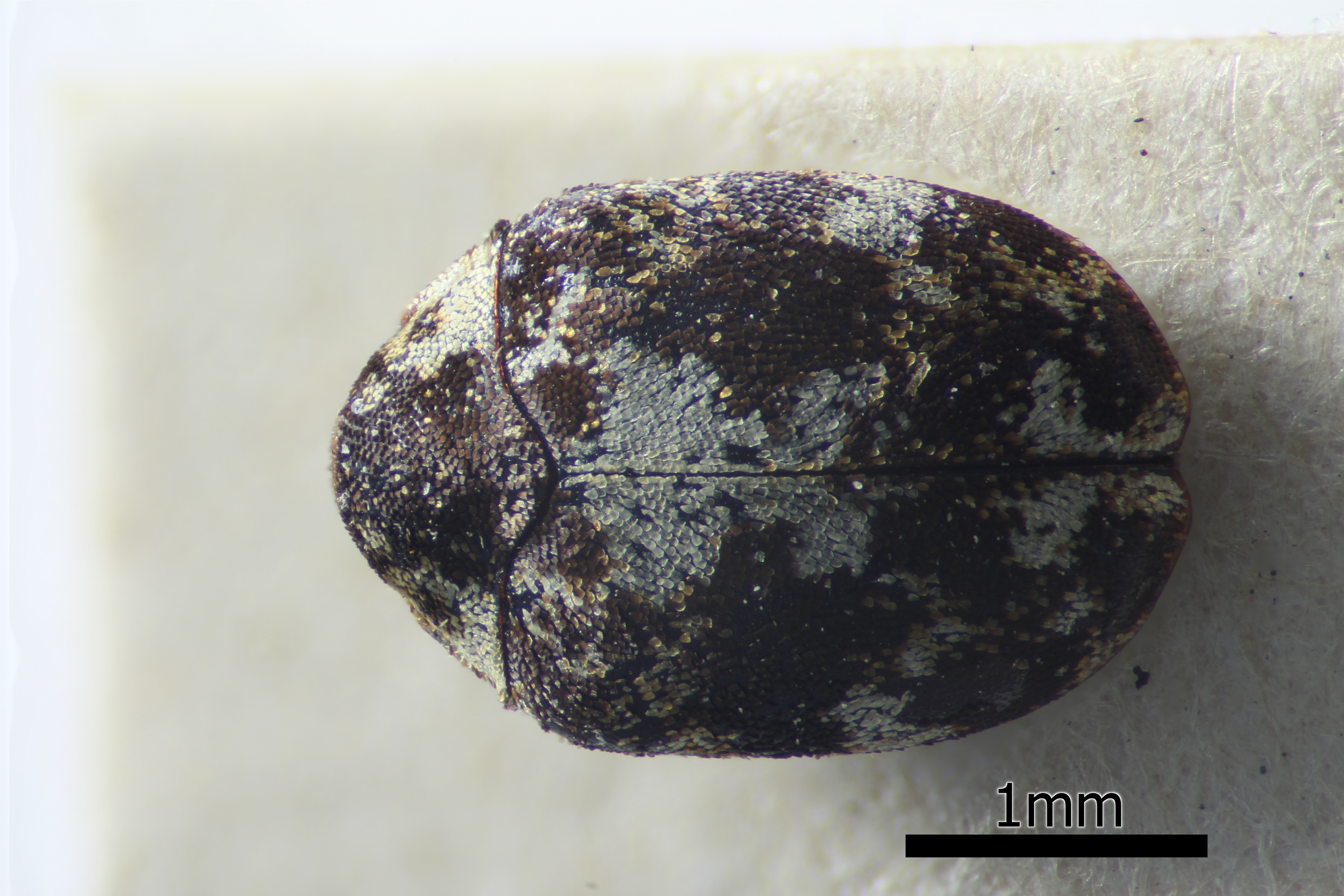

Scientific classification
- Kingdom: Animalia
- Phylum: Arthropoda
- Class: Insecta
- Order: Coleoptera
- Suborder: Polyphaga
- Family: Dermestidae
- Genus: Anthrenus
- Species: A. lepidus

Binomial name
- Anthrenus lepidus LeConte, 1854

= Anthrenus lepidus =

Species of beetle

Anthrenus lepidus is a species of carpet beetle in the family Dermestidae. It is found in North America.

== Subspecies ==
These four subspecies belong to the species Anthrenus lepidus:

- Anthrenus lepidus conspersus Casey
- Anthrenus lepidus lepidus
- Anthrenus lepidus obtectus Casey
- Anthrenus lepidus suffusus Casey

== See also ==
- Anthrenus scrophulariae species group

Similar species:

- Anthrenus scrophulariae, cosmopolitan
- Anthrenus sophonisba, from United States
- Anthrenus picturatus, generally in Russia and Eastern Europe
- Anthrenus ethiopicus, from Africa
