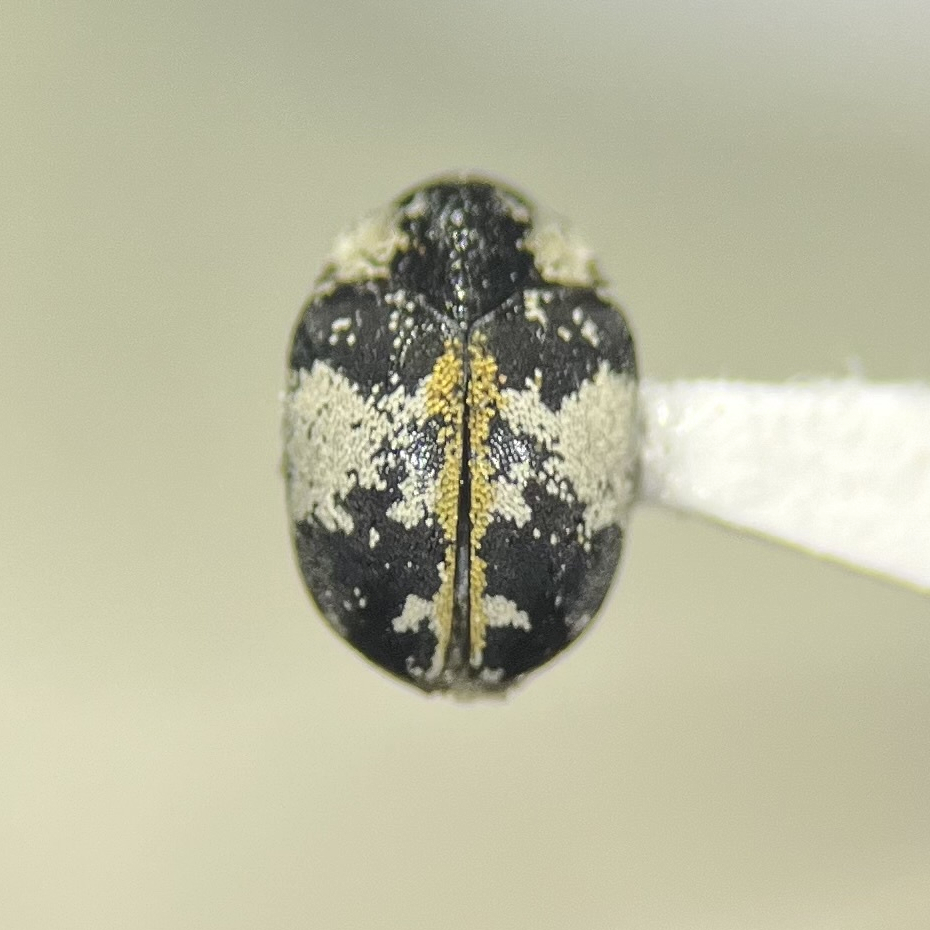
- Dorsal view
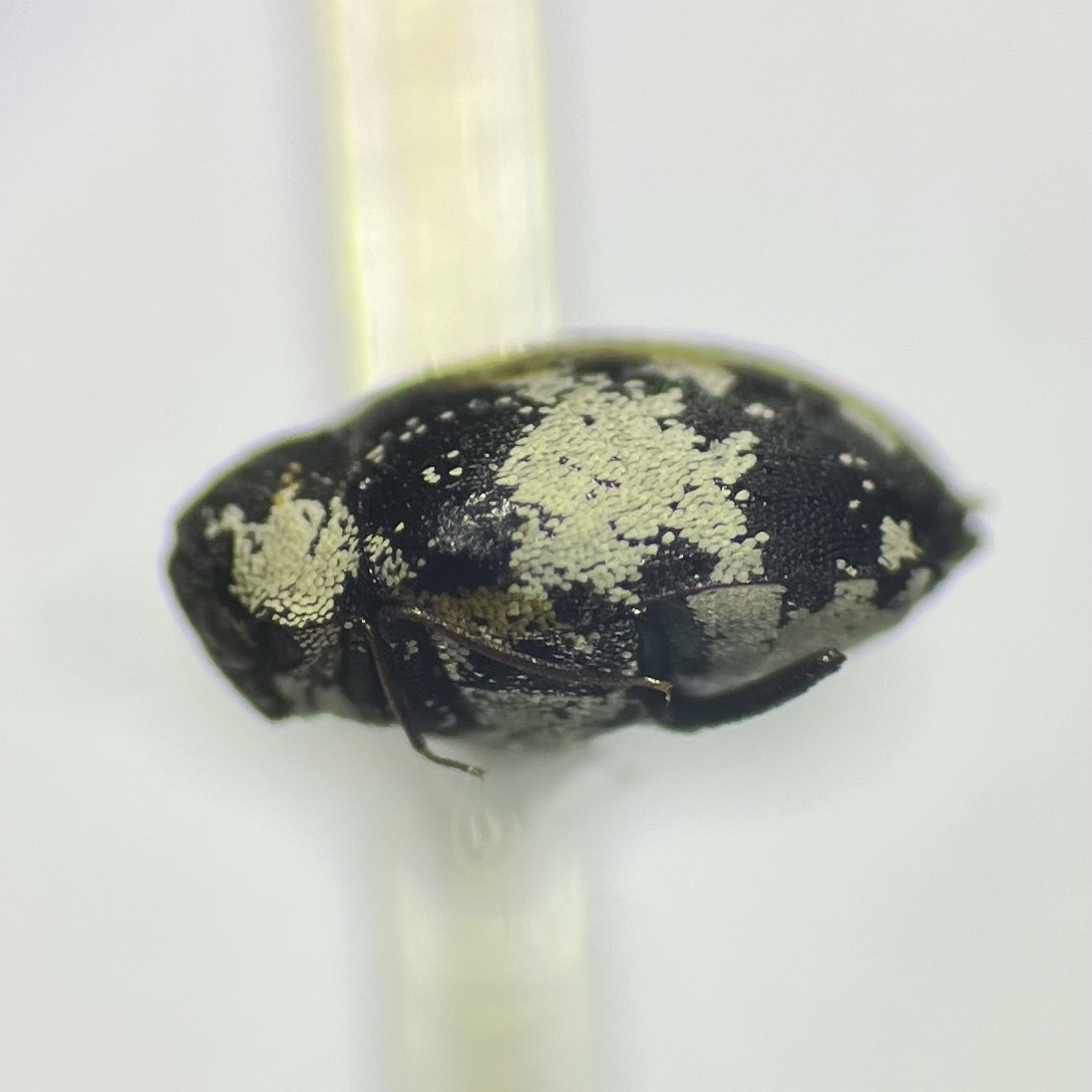
- Side view

Scientific classification
- Kingdom: Animalia
- Phylum: Arthropoda
- Clade: Pancrustacea
- Class: Insecta
- Order: Coleoptera
- Suborder: Polyphaga
- Family: Dermestidae
- Tribe: Anthrenini
- Genus: Anthrenus
- Species: A. thoracicus

Binomial name
- Anthrenus thoracicus Melsheimer, 1844

= Anthrenus thoracicus =

Species of beetle

Anthrenus thoracicus is a species of carpet beetle that is present in the United States, including such states as: Arkansas, Illinois, Minnesota, Mississippi, Missouri, Montana, Oklahoma, Pennsylvania, South Carolina, Texas.

== See also ==
- Anthrenus scrophulariae species group

Similar species:

- Anthrenus scrophulariae, nearly cosmopolitan
- Anthrenus sophonisba, from United States
- Anthrenus chiton, from United States
