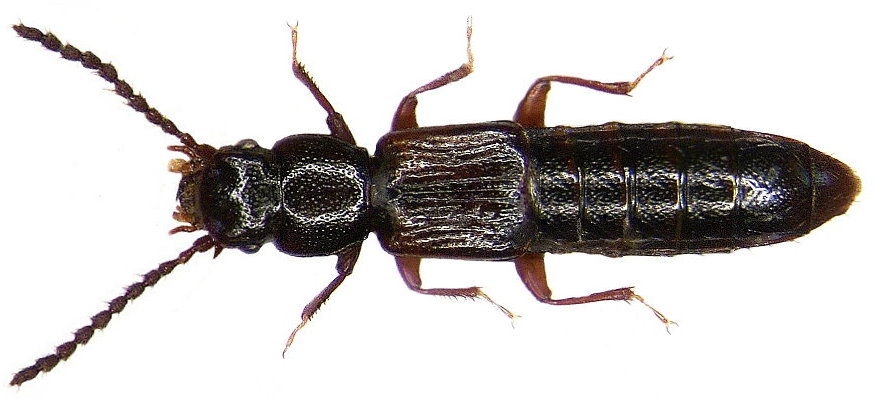
- Siagonium quadricorne 4,5-5 mm

Scientific classification
- Domain: Eukaryota
- Kingdom: Animalia
- Phylum: Arthropoda
- Class: Insecta
- Order: Coleoptera
- Suborder: Polyphaga
- Infraorder: Staphyliniformia
- Family: Staphylinidae
- Subfamily: Piestinae
- Genus: Siagonium
- Species: S. quadricorne

Binomial name
- Siagonium quadricorne Kirby, 1815

= Siagonium quadricorne =

Species of beetle

Siagonium quadricorne is a species of rove beetle native to Europe.
