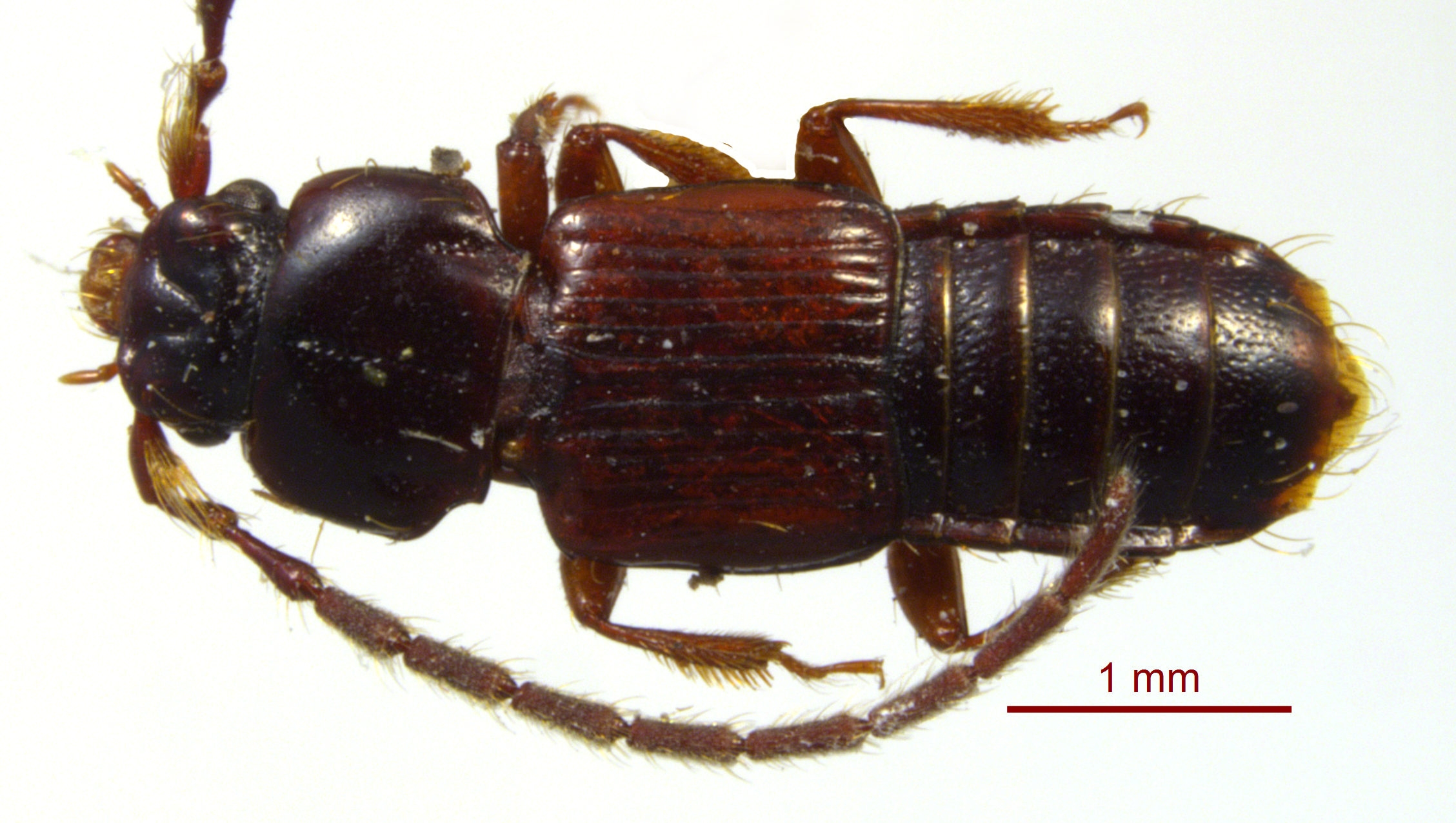
- Piestus extimus

Scientific classification
- Kingdom: Animalia
- Phylum: Arthropoda
- Clade: Pancrustacea
- Class: Insecta
- Order: Coleoptera
- Suborder: Polyphaga
- Infraorder: Staphyliniformia
- Family: Staphylinidae
- Subfamily: Piestinae
- Genus: Piestus; Gravenhorst, 1806

= Piestus =

Genus of beetles

Piestus is a genus of flat rove beetles in the family Staphylinidae. There are more than 30 described species in Piestus.

== Species ==
These 31 species belong to the genus Piestus:

- Piestus acuminatus
- Piestus angularis Fauvel, 1864
- Piestus aper Sharp, 1876
- Piestus boliviensis
- Piestus buquetii Fauvel, 1864
- Piestus capricornis Laporte de Castelnau, 1835
- Piestus chullachaqui Pérez, Rodríguez & Asenjo, 2017
- Piestus convexus
- Piestus ecuadorensis
- Piestus extimus Sharp, 1887
- Piestus formicinus
- Piestus foveolatus
- Piestus fronticornis (Dalman, 1821)
- Piestus fulvipes Erichson, 1840
- Piestus heterocephalus Fauvel, 1902
- Piestus imperfectus
- Piestus lacordairei Laporte de Castelnau, 1835
- Piestus longicornis (Lacordaire, 1833)
- Piestus longipennis Fauvel, 1864
- Piestus mexicanus Laporte, 1835
- Piestus minutus Erichson, 1840
- Piestus penicillatus (Dalman, 1821)
- Piestus pennicornis Fauvel, 1864
- Piestus pygmaeus Laporte de Castelnau, 1835
- Piestus serrufus
- Piestus similis
- Piestus spinosus (Fabricius, 1801)
- Piestus sulcatus Gravenhorst, 1806
- Piestus surrufus Caron, 2012
- Piestus termitis
- Piestus validus Sharp.These, 1876
