= Hypotelus corniculatus =

Scientific classification
- Kingdom: Animalia
- Phylum: Arthropoda
- Clade: Pancrustacea
- Class: Insecta
- Order: Coleoptera
- Suborder: Polyphaga
- Infraorder: Staphyliniformia
- Family: Staphylinidae
- Genus: Hypotelus
- Species: H. corniculatus

Binomial name
- Hypotelus corniculatus Bortoluzzi & Caron, 2017

Species of beetle

Hypotelus corniculatus is a species of beetle of the family Staphylinidae. It is found in Costa Rica.

== Description ==
Adults reach a length of about 4.2 mm (0.17 in). They are entirely brown with the legs somewhat lighter.

== Etymology ==
The species name is derived from Latin corniculatus (meaning horned) and refers to the small horns on the front of the head.
