= Hypotelus insulanus =

Scientific classification
- Kingdom: Animalia
- Phylum: Arthropoda
- Clade: Pancrustacea
- Class: Insecta
- Order: Coleoptera
- Suborder: Polyphaga
- Infraorder: Staphyliniformia
- Family: Staphylinidae
- Genus: Hypotelus
- Species: H. insulanus

Binomial name
- Hypotelus insulanus Bierig, 1934

Species of beetle

Hypotelus insulanus is a species of beetle of the family Staphylinidae. It is found in Cuba, Jamaica, the Dominican Republic and St. Vincent.

== Description ==
Adults reach a length of about 2.1–3 mm (0.083–0.118 in). They are light brown to brown with yellowish elytra. The appendages are lighter than the rest of the body.
