= Hypotelus laevis =

Scientific classification
- Kingdom: Animalia
- Phylum: Arthropoda
- Clade: Pancrustacea
- Class: Insecta
- Order: Coleoptera
- Suborder: Polyphaga
- Infraorder: Staphyliniformia
- Family: Staphylinidae
- Genus: Hypotelus
- Species: H. laevis

Binomial name
- Hypotelus laevis (Solsky, 1872)

Synonyms
- Piestus laevis Solsky, 1872

Species of beetle

Hypotelus laevis is a species of beetle of the family Staphylinidae. It is found in Peru and Bolivia.

== Description ==
Adults reach a length of about 3–3.6 mm (0.12–0.14 in). They have a light brown to dark brown body, with the apical one-fourth of the elytra darker.
