= Hypotelus castaneus =

Scientific classification
- Kingdom: Animalia
- Phylum: Arthropoda
- Clade: Pancrustacea
- Class: Insecta
- Order: Coleoptera
- Suborder: Polyphaga
- Infraorder: Staphyliniformia
- Family: Staphylinidae
- Genus: Hypotelus
- Species: H. castaneus

Binomial name
- Hypotelus castaneus Bortoluzzi & Caron, 2017

Species of beetle

Hypotelus castaneus is a species of beetle of the family Staphylinidae. It is found in Costa Rica, Panama, Colombia, Venezuela and Peru.

== Description ==
Adults reach a length of about 2.6–3 mm (0.10–0.12 in). They are reddish dark brown, with lighter appendages.

== Etymology ==
The species name is derived from Latin castaneus (meaning of the color of chestnuts) and refers to the brown color of the entire body.
