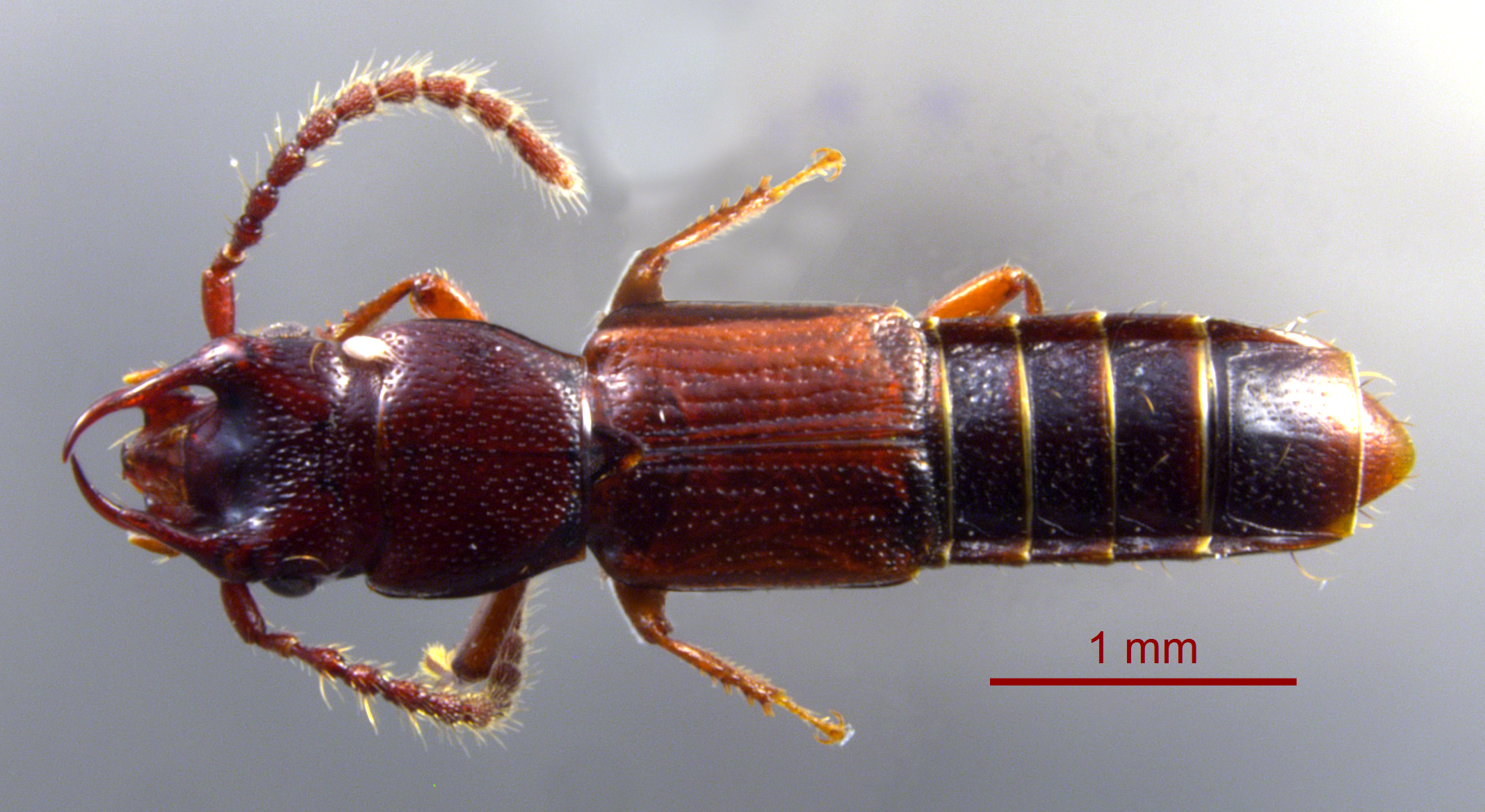

Scientific classification
- Kingdom: Animalia
- Phylum: Arthropoda
- Clade: Pancrustacea
- Class: Insecta
- Order: Coleoptera
- Suborder: Polyphaga
- Infraorder: Staphyliniformia
- Family: Staphylinidae
- Genus: Siagonium
- Species: S. punctatum

Binomial name
- Siagonium punctatum (LeConte, 1866)

= Siagonium punctatum =

Species of beetle

Siagonium punctatum is a species of flat rove beetle in the family Staphylinidae.
