= Hypotelus andinus =

Scientific classification
- Kingdom: Animalia
- Phylum: Arthropoda
- Clade: Pancrustacea
- Class: Insecta
- Order: Coleoptera
- Suborder: Polyphaga
- Infraorder: Staphyliniformia
- Family: Staphylinidae
- Genus: Hypotelus
- Species: H. andinus

Binomial name
- Hypotelus andinus (Bernhauer, 1917)

Synonyms
- Piestus (Antropiestus) andinus Bernhauer, 1917

Species of beetle

Hypotelus andinus is a species of beetle of the family Staphylinidae. It is found in Colombia, Ecuador and Bolivia.

== Description ==
Adults reach a length of about 6.1 mm (0.24 in). They are entirely black with the legs somewhat lighter.
