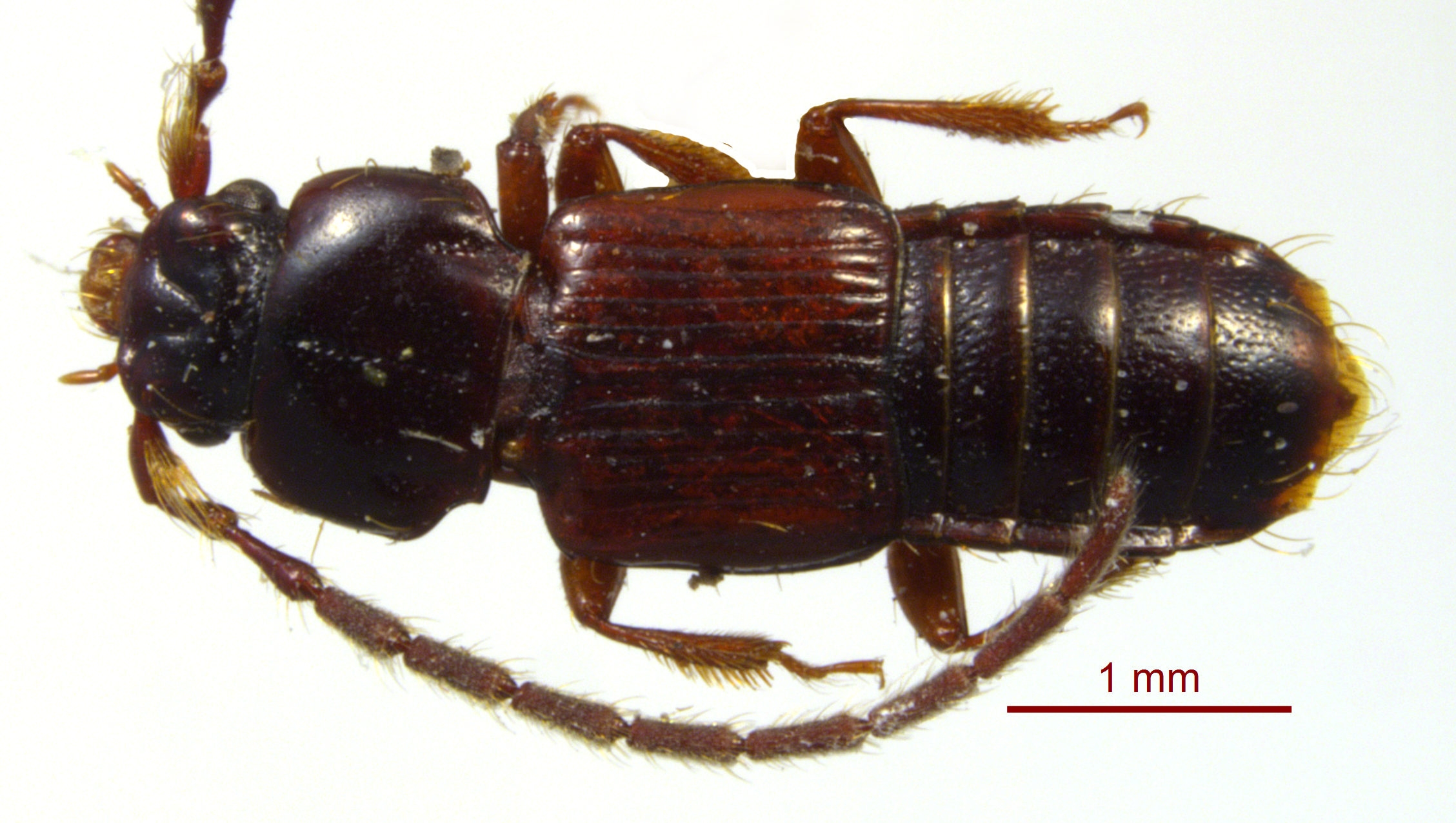

Scientific classification
- Kingdom: Animalia
- Phylum: Arthropoda
- Class: Insecta
- Order: Coleoptera
- Suborder: Polyphaga
- Infraorder: Staphyliniformia
- Family: Staphylinidae
- Genus: Piestus
- Species: P. extimus

Binomial name
- Piestus extimus Sharp, 1887

= Piestus extimus =

Species of beetle

Piestus extimus is a species of flat rove beetle in the family Staphylinidae. It is found in Central America and North America.
