= Siagonium americanum =

Scientific classification
- Domain: Eukaryota
- Kingdom: Animalia
- Phylum: Arthropoda
- Class: Insecta
- Order: Coleoptera
- Suborder: Polyphaga
- Infraorder: Staphyliniformia
- Family: Staphylinidae
- Genus: Siagonium
- Species: S. americanum

Binomial name
- Siagonium americanum (Melsheimer, 1844)

Species of beetle

Siagonium americanum is a species of flat rove beetle in the family Staphylinidae. It is found in North America.
