= Hypotelus =

Scientific classification
- Kingdom: Animalia
- Phylum: Arthropoda
- Clade: Pancrustacea
- Class: Insecta
- Order: Coleoptera
- Suborder: Polyphaga
- Infraorder: Staphyliniformia
- Family: Staphylinidae
- Subfamily: Piestinae
- Genus: Hypotelus; Erichson, 1839

Synonyms
- Eccoptopiestus Scheerpeltz, 1952; Piestus (Eccoptopiestus) Scheerpeltz, 1952; Piestus (Antropiestus) Bernhauer, 1917

Genus of beetles

Hypotelus is a genus of beetles of the family Staphylinidae.

== Species ==
- Hypotelus andinus (Bernhauer, 1917)
- Hypotelus brevitarsus Bortoluzzi & Caron, 2017
- Hypotelus castaneus Bortoluzzi & Caron, 2017
- Hypotelus chusqueaticus McClarin and Caron, 2025
- Hypotelus corniculatus Bortoluzzi & Caron, 2017
- Hypotelus insulanus Bierig, 1934
- Hypotelus laevis Solsky, 1872
- Hypotelus marginatus Sharp, 1887
- Hypotelus melanodelta Bortoluzzi & Caron, 2017
- Hypotelus micans Sharp, 1876
- Hypotelus monnei Paiva & Caron, 2026
- Hypotelus praecox Erichson, 1840
- Hypotelus pusillus Erichson, 1840
- Hypotelus scheerpeltzi Bortoluzzi & Caron, 2017
- Hypotelus testaceus Bierig, 1934
