= Hypotelus micans =

Scientific classification
- Kingdom: Animalia
- Phylum: Arthropoda
- Clade: Pancrustacea
- Class: Insecta
- Order: Coleoptera
- Suborder: Polyphaga
- Infraorder: Staphyliniformia
- Family: Staphylinidae
- Genus: Hypotelus
- Species: H. micans

Binomial name
- Hypotelus micans Sharp, 1876

Species of beetle

Hypotelus micans is a species of beetle of the family Staphylinidae. It is found in Brazil (Amazonas).
