= Hypotelus scheerpeltzi =

Scientific classification
- Kingdom: Animalia
- Phylum: Arthropoda
- Clade: Pancrustacea
- Class: Insecta
- Order: Coleoptera
- Suborder: Polyphaga
- Infraorder: Staphyliniformia
- Family: Staphylinidae
- Genus: Hypotelus
- Species: H. scheerpeltzi

Binomial name
- Hypotelus scheerpeltzi Bortoluzzi & Caron, 2017

Species of beetle

Hypotelus scheerpeltzi is a species of beetle of the family Staphylinidae. It is found in Peru.

== Description ==
Adults reach a length of about 3–3.3 mm (0.12–0.13 in). They are dark brown, with yellowish elytra with basal and apical darker areas.

== Etymology ==
The species is named for Otto Scheerpeltz, who first recognized it is as a new species but did not describe it.
