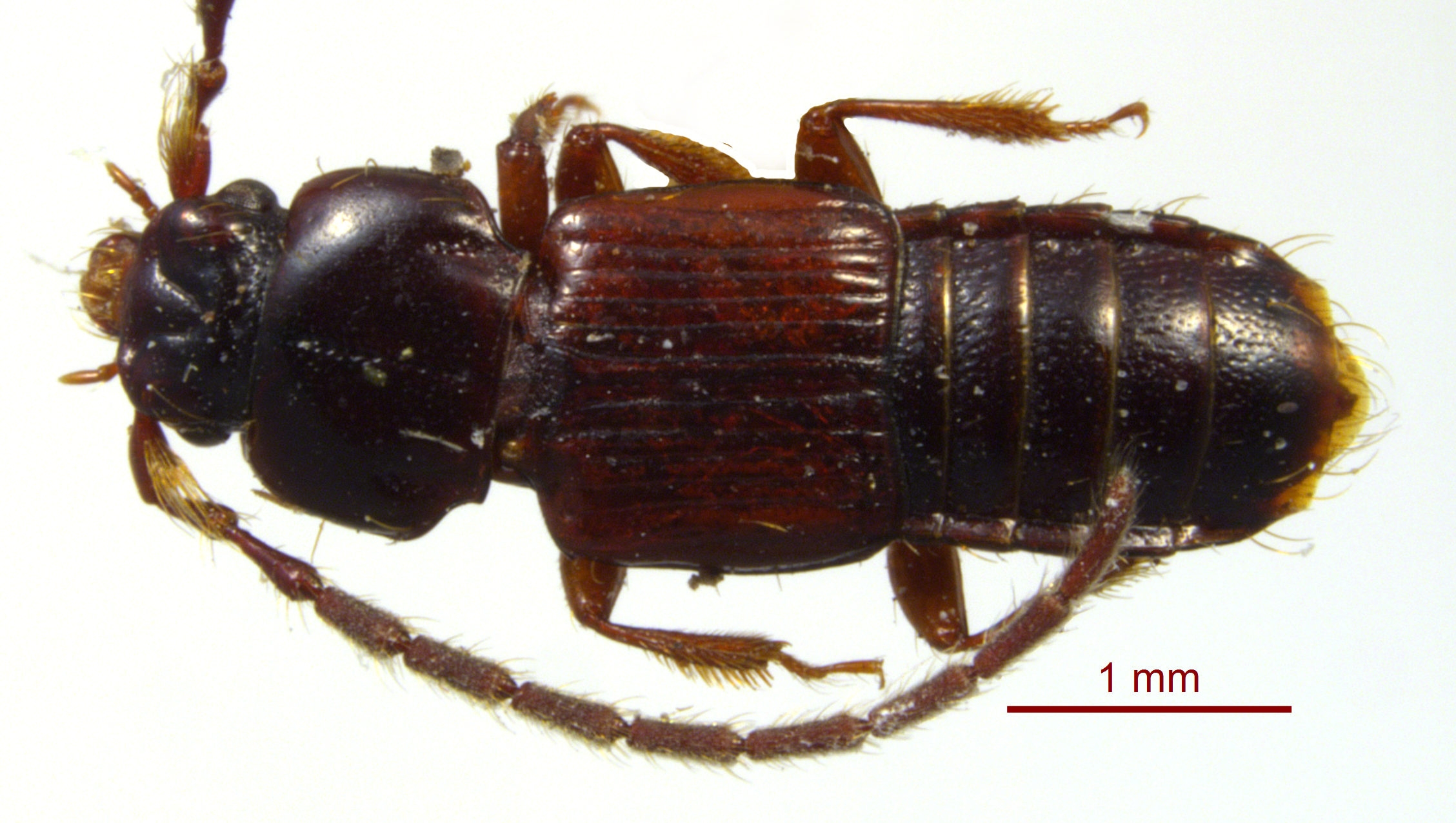
- Piestus extimus

Scientific classification
- Kingdom: Animalia
- Phylum: Arthropoda
- Clade: Pancrustacea
- Class: Insecta
- Order: Coleoptera
- Suborder: Polyphaga
- Infraorder: Staphyliniformia
- Family: Staphylinidae
- Subfamily: Piestinae; Erichson, 1839

= Piestinae =

Subfamily of beetles

Piestinae are a subfamily of Staphylinidae.

== Anatomy ==
- Body elongate and depressed, abdomen parallel-sided.
- Antennae inserted under shelf-like corners of frons
- Tarsi 5-5-5
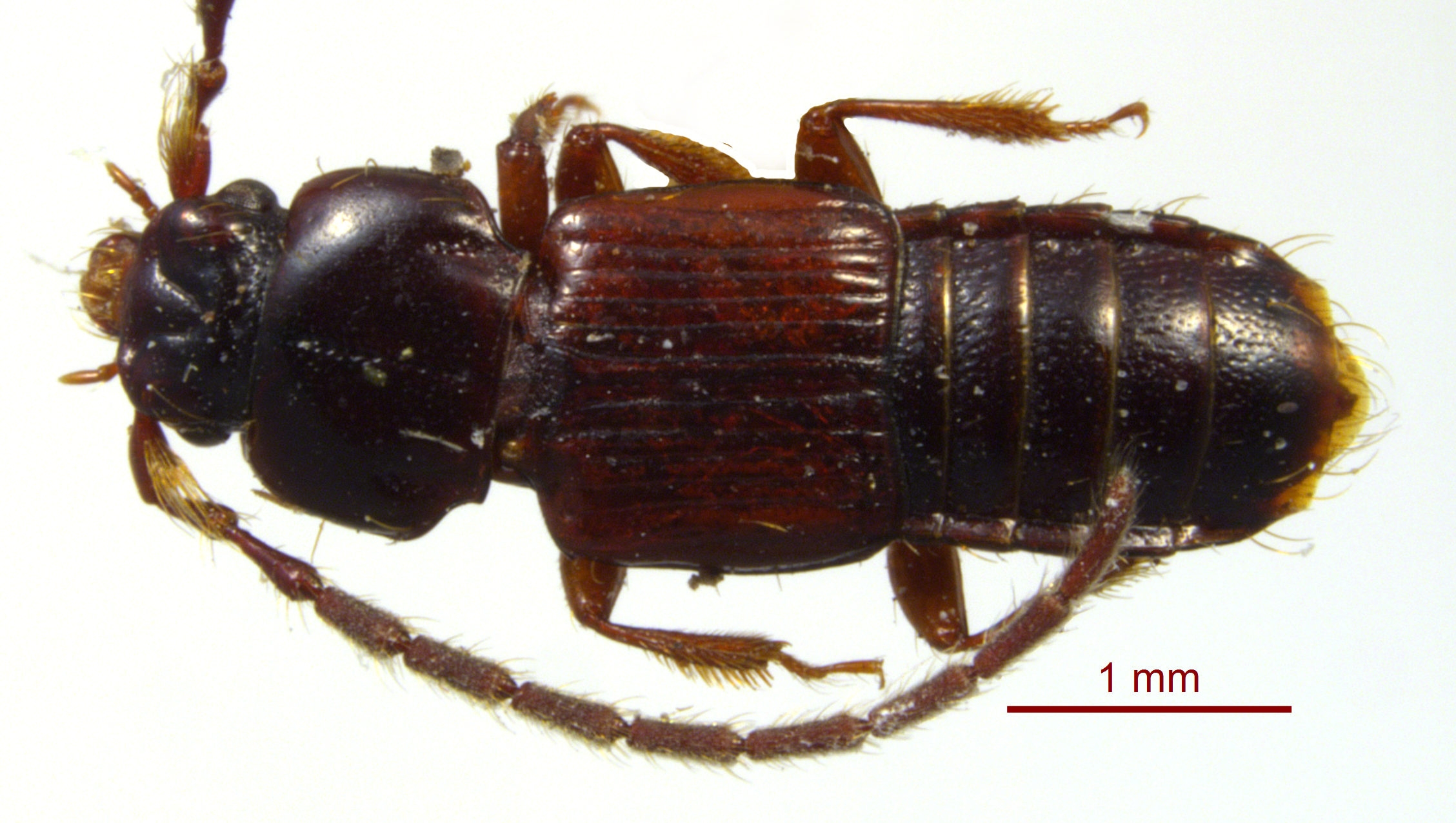
Piestus extimus

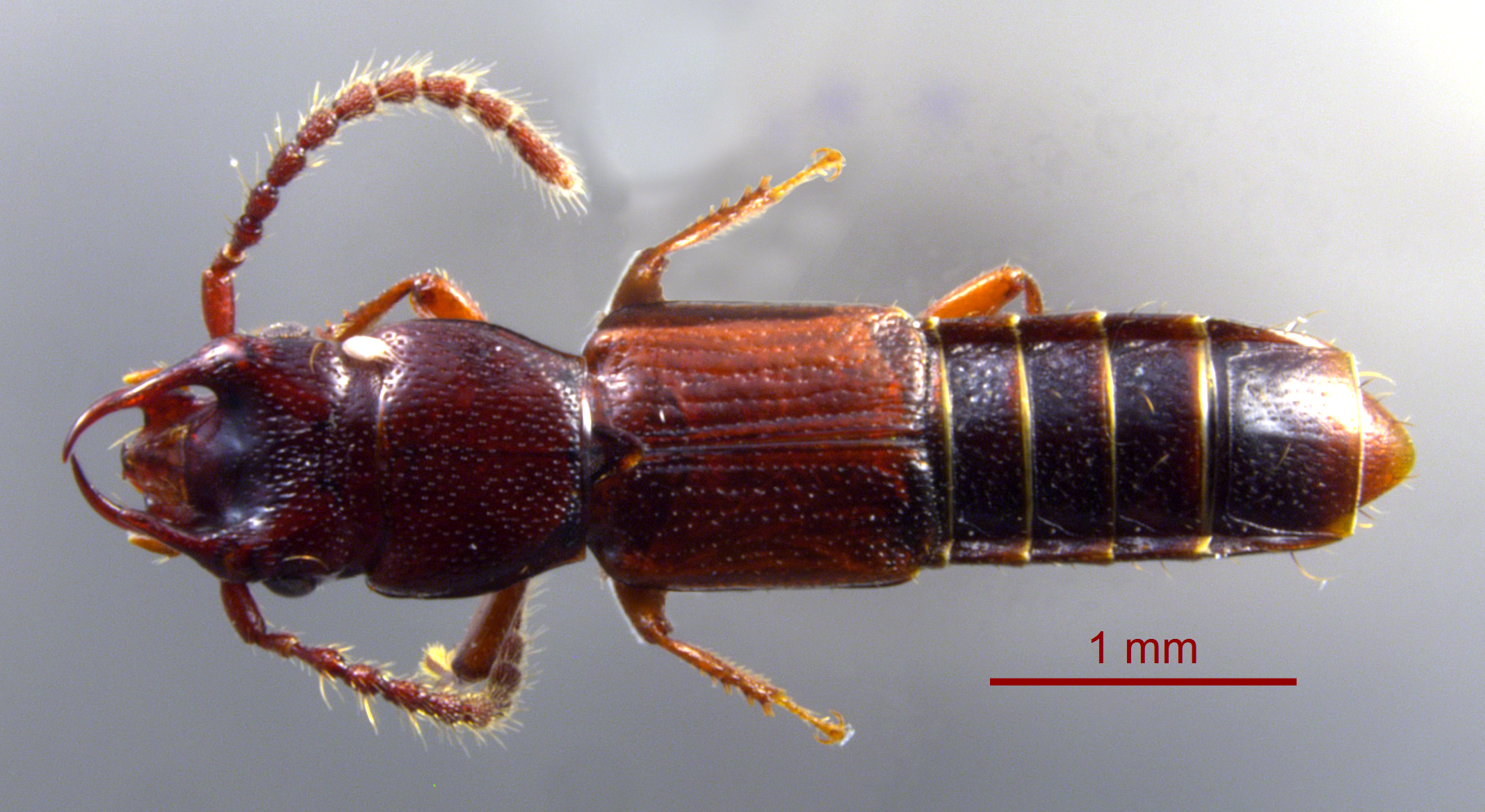
Siagonium punctatum

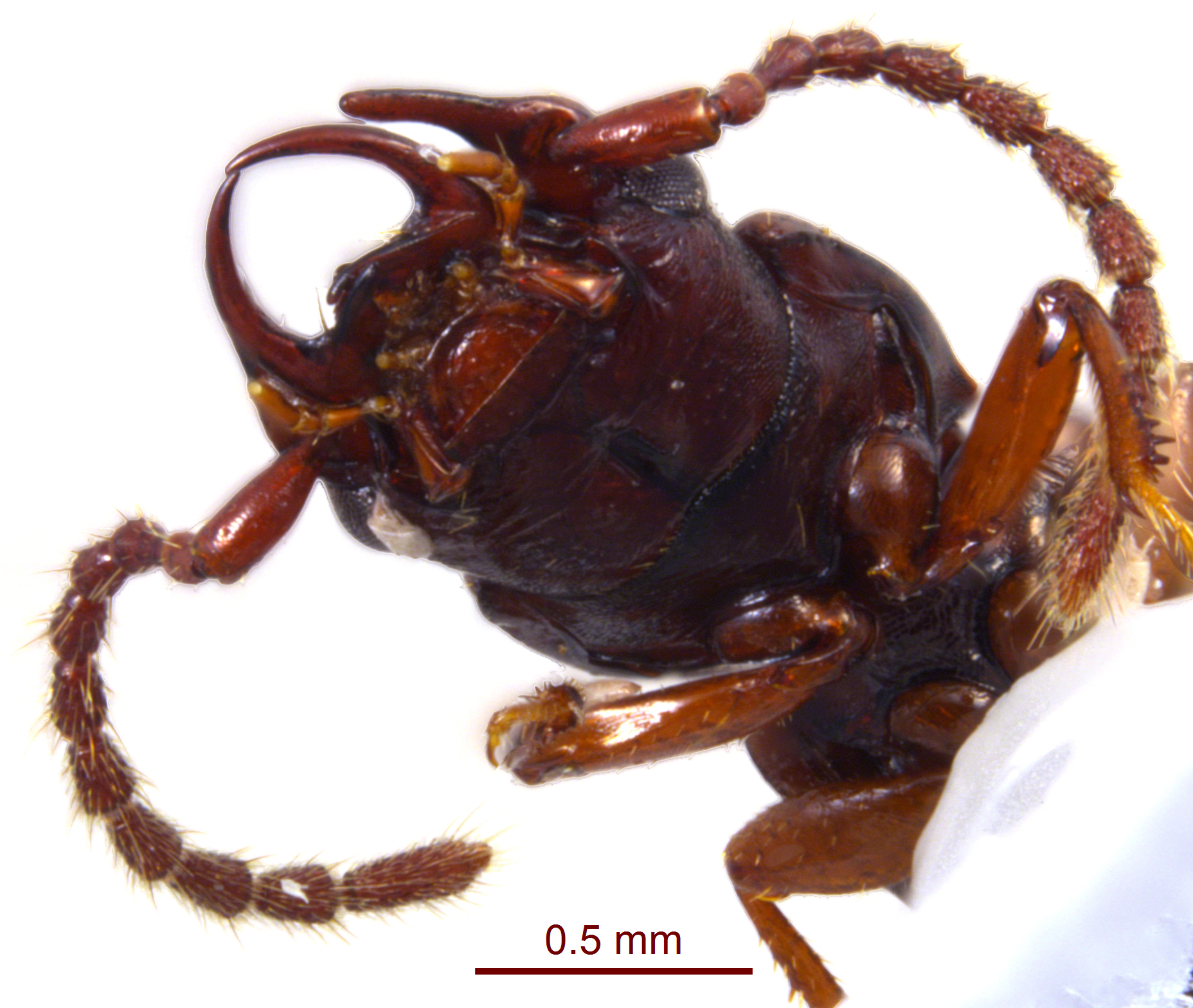
Siagonium punctatum, ventral head

== Ecology ==
- Habitat: many species under bark of decaying trees.
- Collection method: barking.
- Biology: some are saprophages or mycophages.

== Genera ==
There are several genera in Piestinae:

- Eupiestus Kraatz, 1859
- Hypotelus Erichson, 1839^{i c g}
- Parasiagonum Steel, 1950 ^{g}
- Piestoneus Sharp, 1889 ^{g}
- Piestus Gravenhorst, 1806^{i c g b}
- Prognathoides Steel, 1950
- Siagonium Kirby & Spence, 1815^{i c g b}
- †Eopiestus Cai, Chen-Yang & Liang Lü, 2017
- †Paleosiagonium Yue, Yanli, Junjie Gu, Qing Yang, Jinmin Wang & Dong Ren, 2016
- †Propiestus Yamamoto, Caron & Bortoluzzi, 2018

Data sources: i = ITIS, c = Catalogue of Life, g = GBIF, b = Bugguide.net
