= Hypotelus monnei =

Scientific classification
- Kingdom: Animalia
- Phylum: Arthropoda
- Clade: Pancrustacea
- Class: Insecta
- Order: Coleoptera
- Suborder: Polyphaga
- Infraorder: Staphyliniformia
- Family: Staphylinidae
- Genus: Hypotelus
- Species: H. monnei

Binomial name
- Hypotelus monnei Paiva & Caron, 2026

Species of beetle

Hypotelus monnei is a species of beetle of the family Staphylinidae. It is found in Brazil (São Paulo).

== Description ==
Adults reach a length of about 4.37 mm (0.172 in). They have an elongate and parallel‑sided body. The head is dark brown, while the thorax, appendages and abdomen are yellow brown, except for abdominal segment VII, which is darker than the anterior one. The dorsal integument of the front of the head has a granulate microsculpture and the vertex and tempora of the head and pronotum have dispersed fine punctures and wavy microstriae. The elytra have dispersed fine punctures and one longitudinal, finely punctate stria close to elytral suture. The abdominal tergites are overall dull with granulate microsculpture on the lateral areas.

== Etymology ==
The species is named in honour of Dr. Miguel Angel Monné.
