= Hypotelus testaceus =

Scientific classification
- Kingdom: Animalia
- Phylum: Arthropoda
- Clade: Pancrustacea
- Class: Insecta
- Order: Coleoptera
- Suborder: Polyphaga
- Infraorder: Staphyliniformia
- Family: Staphylinidae
- Genus: Hypotelus
- Species: H. testaceus

Binomial name
- Hypotelus testaceus Bierig, 1934

Species of beetle

Hypotelus testaceus is a species of beetle of the family Staphylinidae. It is found in Panama.

== Description ==
Adults reach a length of about 2.6–3 mm (0.10–0.12 in). They are brown, with the basal two-thirds of the elytra, parts of the abdominal segments and the appendages lighter.
