= Hypotelus melanodelta =

Scientific classification
- Kingdom: Animalia
- Phylum: Arthropoda
- Clade: Pancrustacea
- Class: Insecta
- Order: Coleoptera
- Suborder: Polyphaga
- Infraorder: Staphyliniformia
- Family: Staphylinidae
- Genus: Hypotelus
- Species: H. melanodelta

Binomial name
- Hypotelus melanodelta Bortoluzzi & Caron, 2017

Species of beetle

Hypotelus melanodelta is a species of beetle of the family Staphylinidae. It is found in Colombia.

== Description ==
Adults reach a length of about 2.8 mm (0.11 in). They are brownish, but the elytra are yellowish with a basal darker area.

== Etymology ==
The species name is derived from Greek melan (meaning black, dark) and delta (meaning shaped like a triangle) and refers to the dark colour pattern of the elytra.
