= Hypotelus praecox =

Scientific classification
- Kingdom: Animalia
- Phylum: Arthropoda
- Clade: Pancrustacea
- Class: Insecta
- Order: Coleoptera
- Suborder: Polyphaga
- Infraorder: Staphyliniformia
- Family: Staphylinidae
- Genus: Hypotelus
- Species: H. praecox

Binomial name
- Hypotelus praecox Erichson, 1840

Species of beetle

Hypotelus praecox is a species of beetle of the family Staphylinidae. It is found in Colombia, Venezuela, Ecuador and possibly Brazil.

== Description ==
Adults reach a length of about 2.8 mm (0.11 in). They are light brown, with the head, mandibles and abdomen slightly darker brown.
