= Hypotelus brevitarsus =

Scientific classification
- Kingdom: Animalia
- Phylum: Arthropoda
- Clade: Pancrustacea
- Class: Insecta
- Order: Coleoptera
- Suborder: Polyphaga
- Infraorder: Staphyliniformia
- Family: Staphylinidae
- Genus: Hypotelus
- Species: H. brevitarsus

Binomial name
- Hypotelus brevitarsus Bortoluzzi & Caron, 2017

Species of beetle

Hypotelus brevitarsus is a species of beetle of the family Staphylinidae. It is found in Panama.

== Description ==
Adults reach a length of about 2.2–2.9 mm (0.087–0.114 in). The dorsal surface is glossy and brown with yellow elytra.

== Etymology ==
The species name is derived from Latin brev (meaning short) and latinized Greek tarsus (meaning foot) and refers to the shape of the metatarsus.
