= Hypotelus pusillus =

Scientific classification
- Kingdom: Animalia
- Phylum: Arthropoda
- Clade: Pancrustacea
- Class: Insecta
- Order: Coleoptera
- Suborder: Polyphaga
- Infraorder: Staphyliniformia
- Family: Staphylinidae
- Genus: Hypotelus
- Species: H. pusillus

Binomial name
- Hypotelus pusillus Erichson, 1840

Synonyms
- Hypotelus lucidus Sharp, 1887; Hypotelus hostilis Fauvel, 1864

Species of beetle

Hypotelus pusillus is a species of beetle of the family Staphylinidae. It is found in the United States (Florida), Mexico (Chiapas, Hidalgo, San Luis Potosí, Tabasco, Vera Cruz), Guatemala, Costa Rica, Panama, Colombia, Venezuela, French Guiana, Peru, Bolivia, Brazil (Pará, Bahia, Rio de Janeiro, São Paulo, Paraná, Santa Catarina, Rio Grande do Sul), Paraguay, Cuba, Jamaica, Grenada, the Grenadines and Trinidad.

== Description ==
Adults reach a length of about 2.4–3 mm (0.094–0.118 in). They are light to dark brown, with yellowish elytra (sometimes with a darker basal area).
