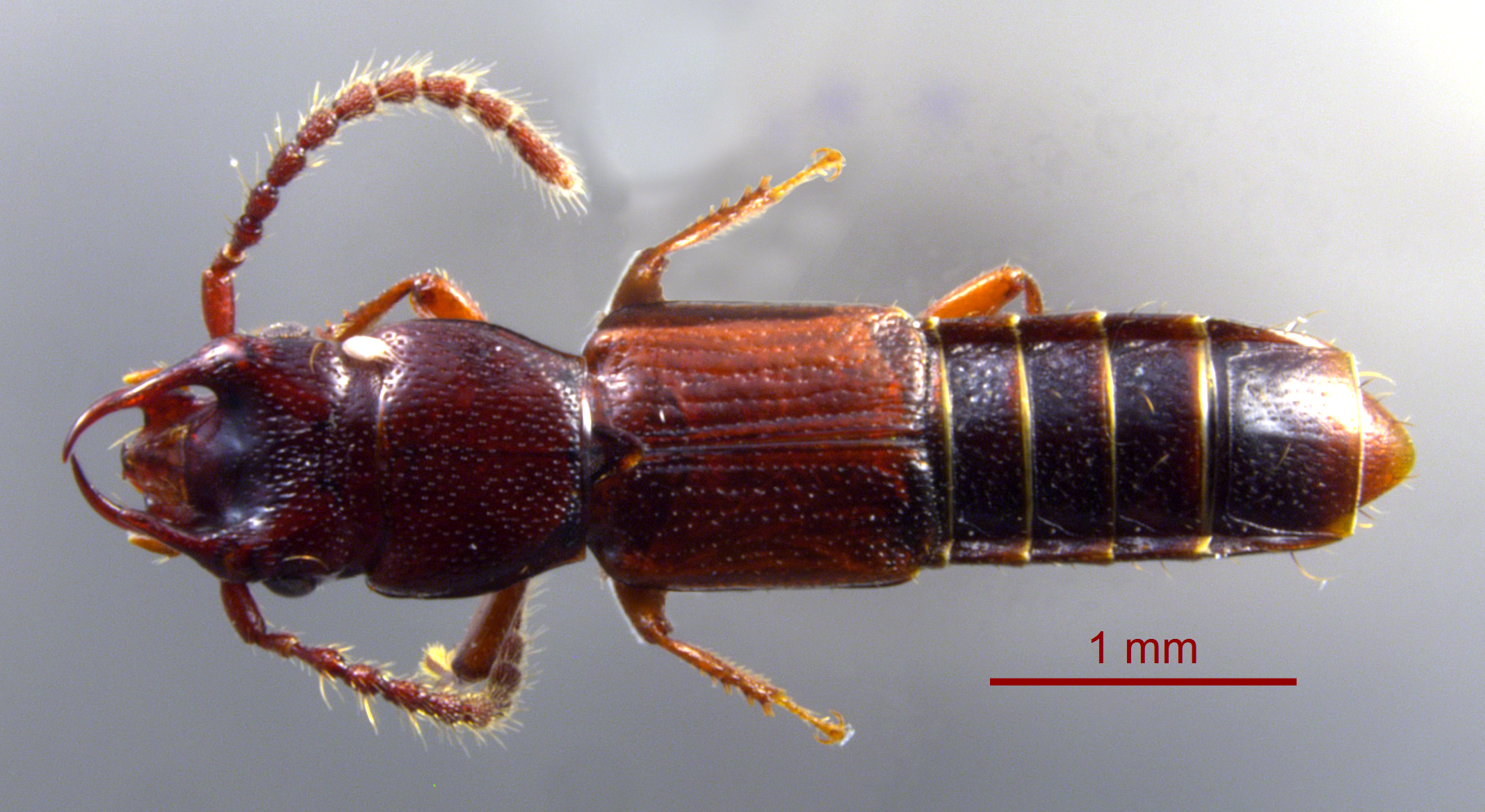
- Siagonium punctatum

Scientific classification
- Domain: Eukaryota
- Kingdom: Animalia
- Phylum: Arthropoda
- Class: Insecta
- Order: Coleoptera
- Suborder: Polyphaga
- Infraorder: Staphyliniformia
- Family: Staphylinidae
- Subfamily: Piestinae
- Genus: Siagonium; Kirby & Spence, 1815

= Siagonium =

Genus of beetles

Siagonium is a genus of flat rove beetles in the family Staphylinidae. There are about 12 described species in Siagonium.

== Species ==
These 12 species belong to the genus Siagonium:

- Siagonium americanum (Melsheimer, 1844)
- Siagonium haroldi Weise, 1879
- Siagonium humerale Germar, 1836
- Siagonium incertum
- Siagonium kojimai
- Siagonium miyamotoi Takai & Nakane, 1985
- Siagonium punctatum (LeConte, 1866)
- Siagonium quadricorne Kirby & Spence, 1815
- Siagonium shokhini Khachikov, 2007
- Siagonium stacesmithi (Hatch, 1957)
- Siagonium vittatum Fauvel, 1875
- Siagonium yamashitai
