= Hypotelus chusqueaticus =

Scientific classification
- Kingdom: Animalia
- Phylum: Arthropoda
- Clade: Pancrustacea
- Class: Insecta
- Order: Coleoptera
- Suborder: Polyphaga
- Infraorder: Staphyliniformia
- Family: Staphylinidae
- Genus: Hypotelus
- Species: H. chusqueaticus

Binomial name
- Hypotelus chusqueaticus McClarin and Caron, 2025

Species of beetle

Hypotelus chusqueaticus is a species of beetle of the family Staphylinidae. It is found in Ecuador.

== Description ==
Adults reach a length of about 4 mm (0.16 in). They are dark brown to black, with the posterior margin of some of the abdominal segments and appendages rusty brown.

== Etymology ==
The species name is derived from the generic name of the bamboo from which the species was collected, Chusquea scandens.
