= Hypotelus marginatus =

Scientific classification
- Kingdom: Animalia
- Phylum: Arthropoda
- Clade: Pancrustacea
- Class: Insecta
- Order: Coleoptera
- Suborder: Polyphaga
- Infraorder: Staphyliniformia
- Family: Staphylinidae
- Genus: Hypotelus
- Species: H. marginatus

Binomial name
- Hypotelus marginatus Sharp, 1887

Species of beetle

Hypotelus marginatus is a species of beetle of the family Staphylinidae. It is found in Guatemala, Colombia and Venezuela.

== Description ==
Adults reach a length of about 3.2 mm (0.13 in). The antennae, head, pronotum and abdominal segments are dark brown, while the elytra and appendages are reddish.
