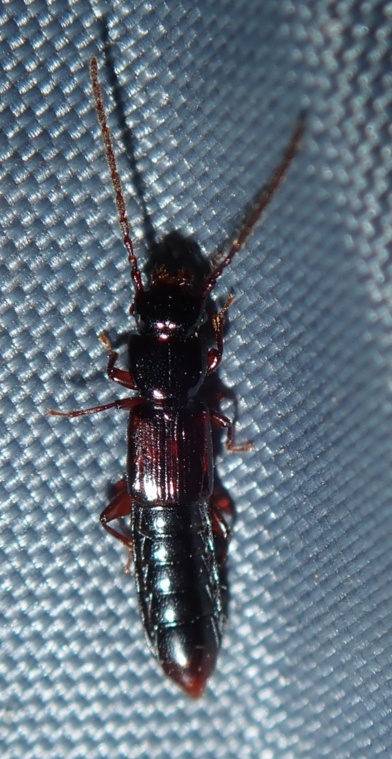

Conservation status
- Data Deficient (NZ TCS)

Scientific classification
- Kingdom: Animalia
- Phylum: Arthropoda
- Class: Insecta
- Order: Coleoptera
- Suborder: Polyphaga
- Infraorder: Staphyliniformia
- Family: Staphylinidae
- Genus: Parasiagonum; Steel, 1950
- Species: P. hudsoni

Binomial name
- Parasiagonum hudsoni (Cameron, 1927)

Synonyms
- Siagonium hudsoni Cameron, 1927

= Parasiagonum =

Genus of beetle

Parasiagonum hudsoni is a species of rove beetle endemic to New Zealand.

== Taxonomy ==
This species was first described by Malcom Cameron from a specimen collected by George Hudson. The specimen was collected from a patch of Karaka trees on the southern coast of Wellington. In 1950, the species was designated the genus Parasiagonum. It is the only member of this genus. The holotype is stored in the Natural History Museum of London.

== Distribution ==
This species is only known from one locality in Wellington, New Zealand. It occurs under the bark of Karaka (Corynocarpus laevigatus) trees.

== Conservation status ==
Under the New Zealand Threat Classification System, this species is listed as "Data Deficient".
