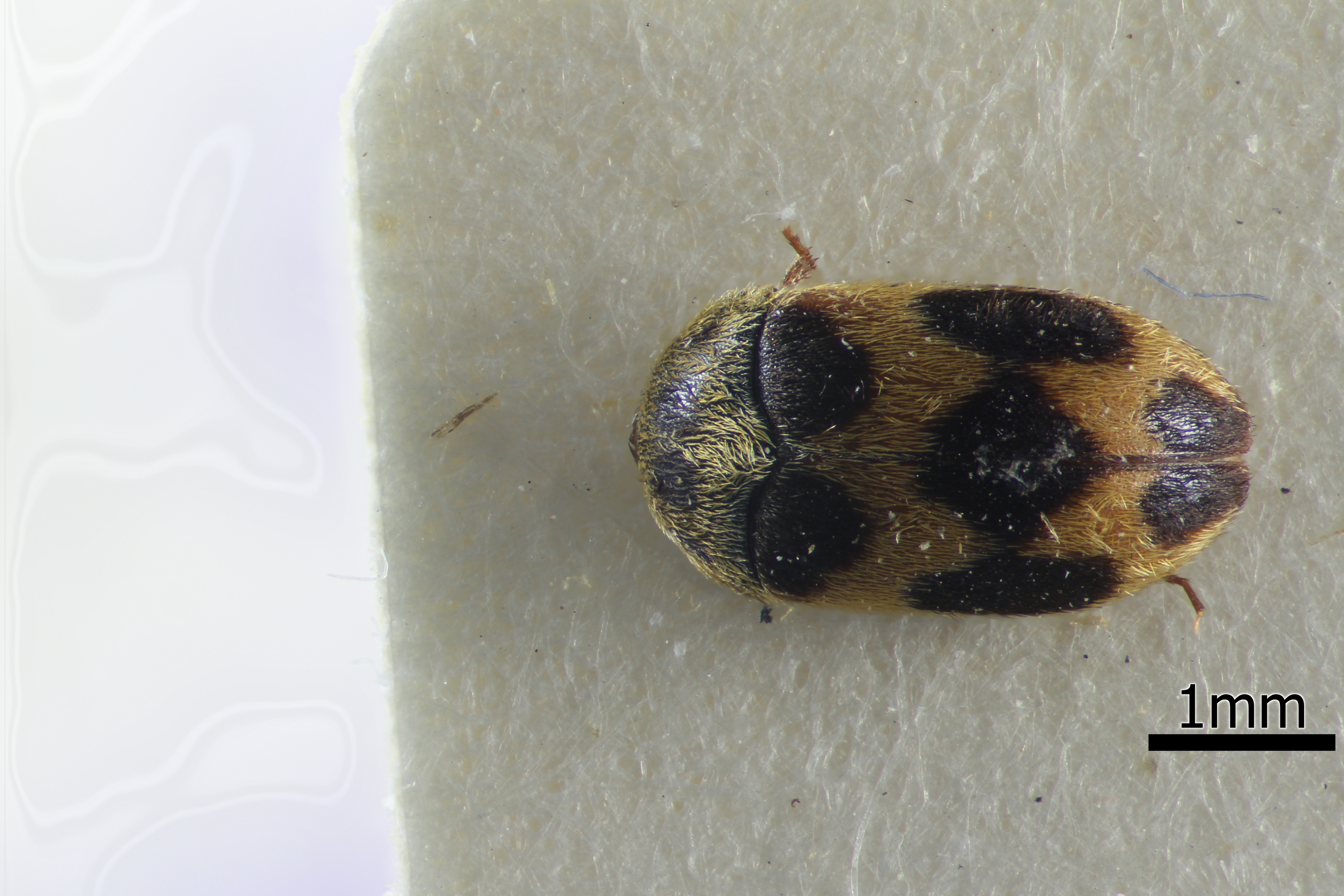

Scientific classification
- Kingdom: Animalia
- Phylum: Arthropoda
- Clade: Pancrustacea
- Class: Insecta
- Order: Coleoptera
- Suborder: Polyphaga
- Family: Dermestidae
- Genus: Attagenus
- Species: A. suspiciosus

Binomial name
- Attagenus suspiciosus Solsky, 1876

= Attagenus suspiciosus =

Species of beetle

Attagenus suspiciosus is a species of carpet beetle in the subfamily Attageninae, family Dermestidae. It is found in regions of Asia: Afghanistan, China (Xinjiang), Iran, Mongolia, Central Asia and Russia (Dagestan).

== See also ==
- Attagenus pictus
