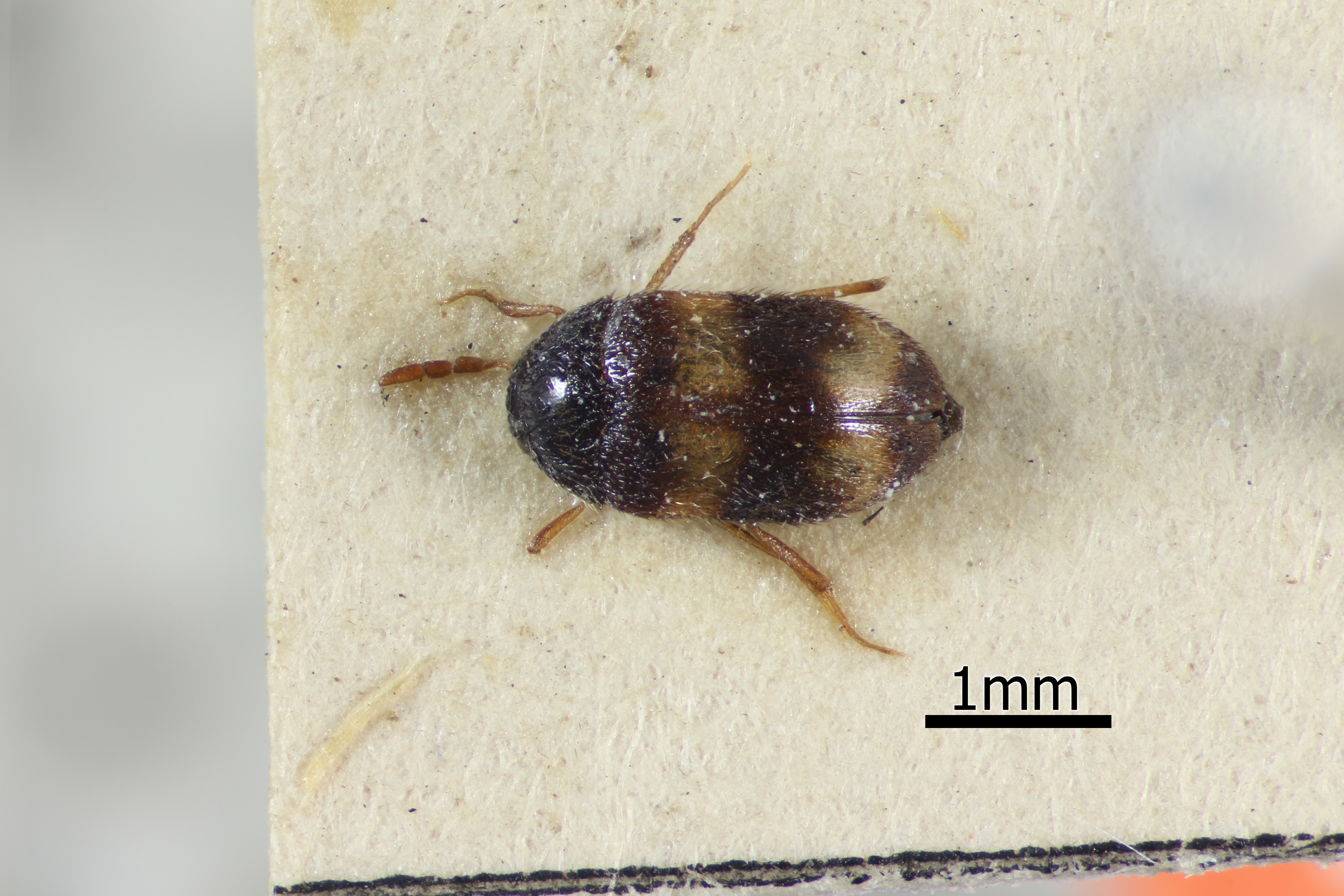

Scientific classification
- Kingdom: Animalia
- Phylum: Arthropoda
- Clade: Pancrustacea
- Class: Insecta
- Order: Coleoptera
- Suborder: Polyphaga
- Family: Dermestidae
- Genus: Attagenus
- Species: A. indicus

Binomial name
- Attagenus indicus Kalík, 1954

= Attagenus indicus =

Species of beetle

Attagenus indicus is a species of carpet beetle in the subfamily Attageninae, family Dermestidae. It is found in Afghanistan, India (Assam, Madhya Pradesh, Uttar Pradesh), and Nepal.
