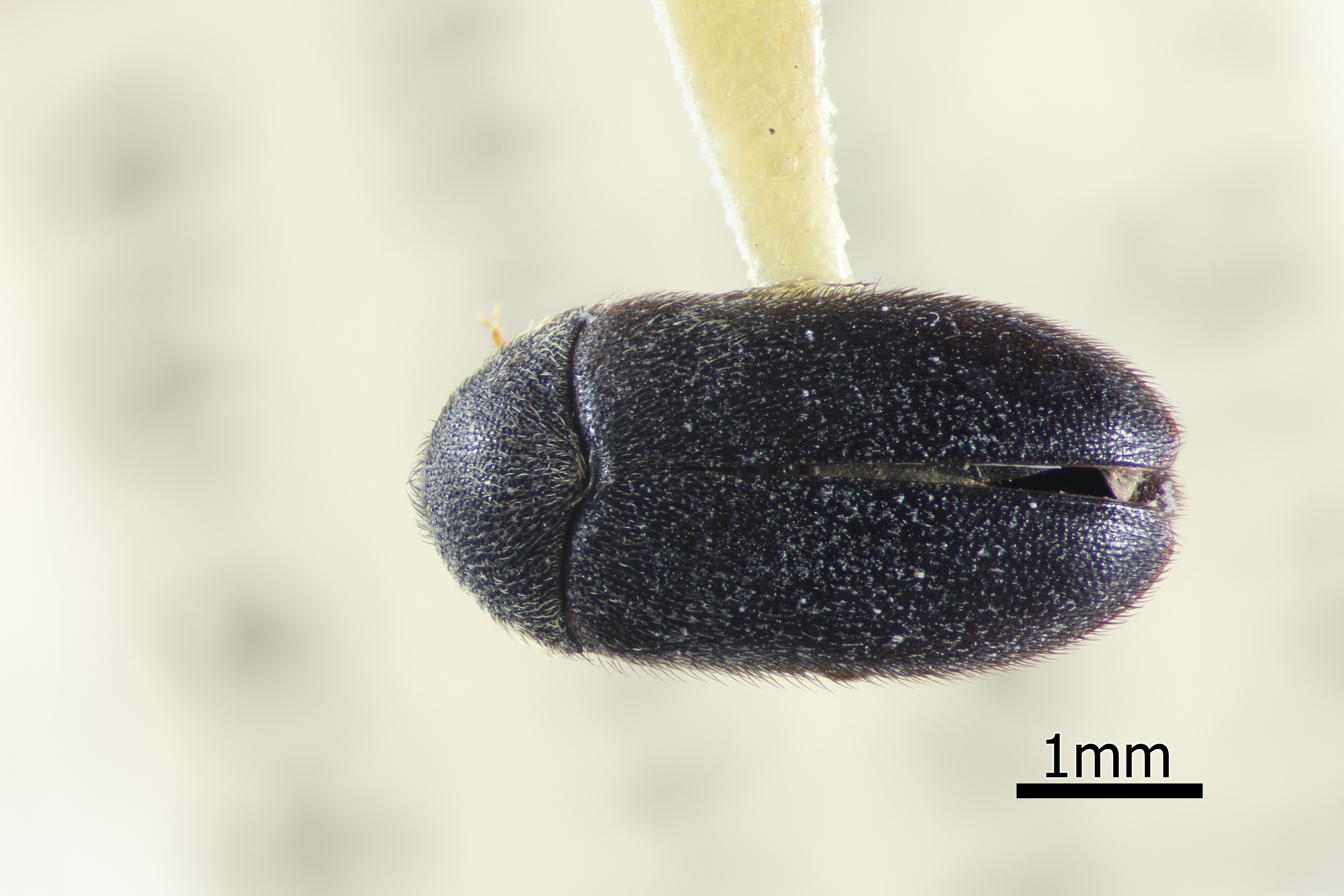

Scientific classification
- Kingdom: Animalia
- Phylum: Arthropoda
- Clade: Pancrustacea
- Class: Insecta
- Order: Coleoptera
- Suborder: Polyphaga
- Family: Dermestidae
- Tribe: Attagenini
- Genus: Attagenus
- Species: A. rufipennis

Binomial name
- Attagenus rufipennis LeConte, 1859

= Attagenus rufipennis =

Species of beetle

Attagenus rufipennis is a species of carpet beetle in the family Dermestidae. It is found in North America.
