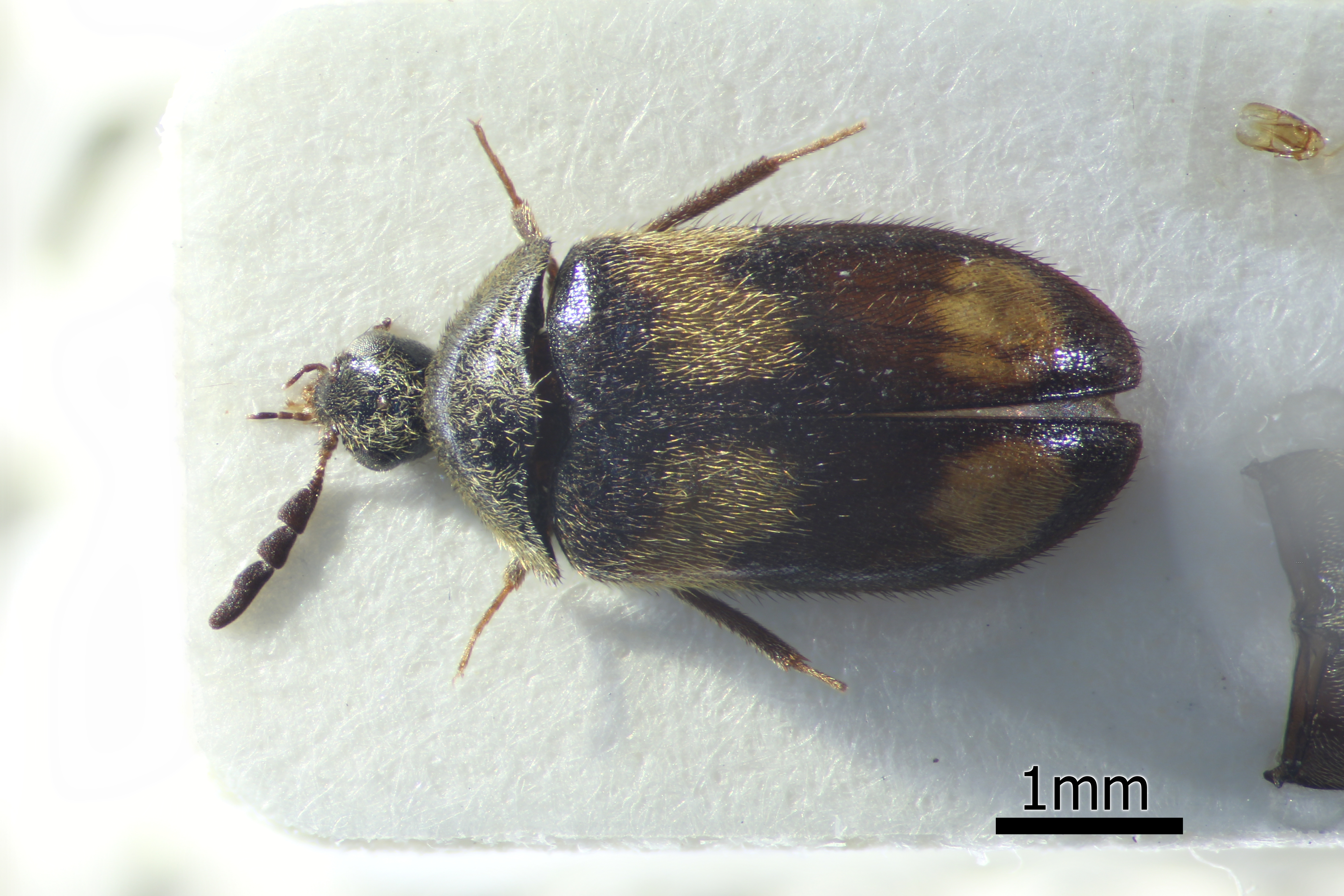

Scientific classification
- Kingdom: Animalia
- Phylum: Arthropoda
- Clade: Pancrustacea
- Class: Insecta
- Order: Coleoptera
- Suborder: Polyphaga
- Family: Dermestidae
- Genus: Attagenus
- Species: A. aurantiacus

Binomial name
- Attagenus aurantiacus Reitter, 1900

= Attagenus aurantiacus =

Species of beetle

Attagenus aurantiacus is a species of carpet beetle in the subfamily Attageninae, family Dermestidae. It is found in several countries in the Middle East, including Iran, Iraq, Israel, Syria, Turkey, and possibly Turkmenistan.
