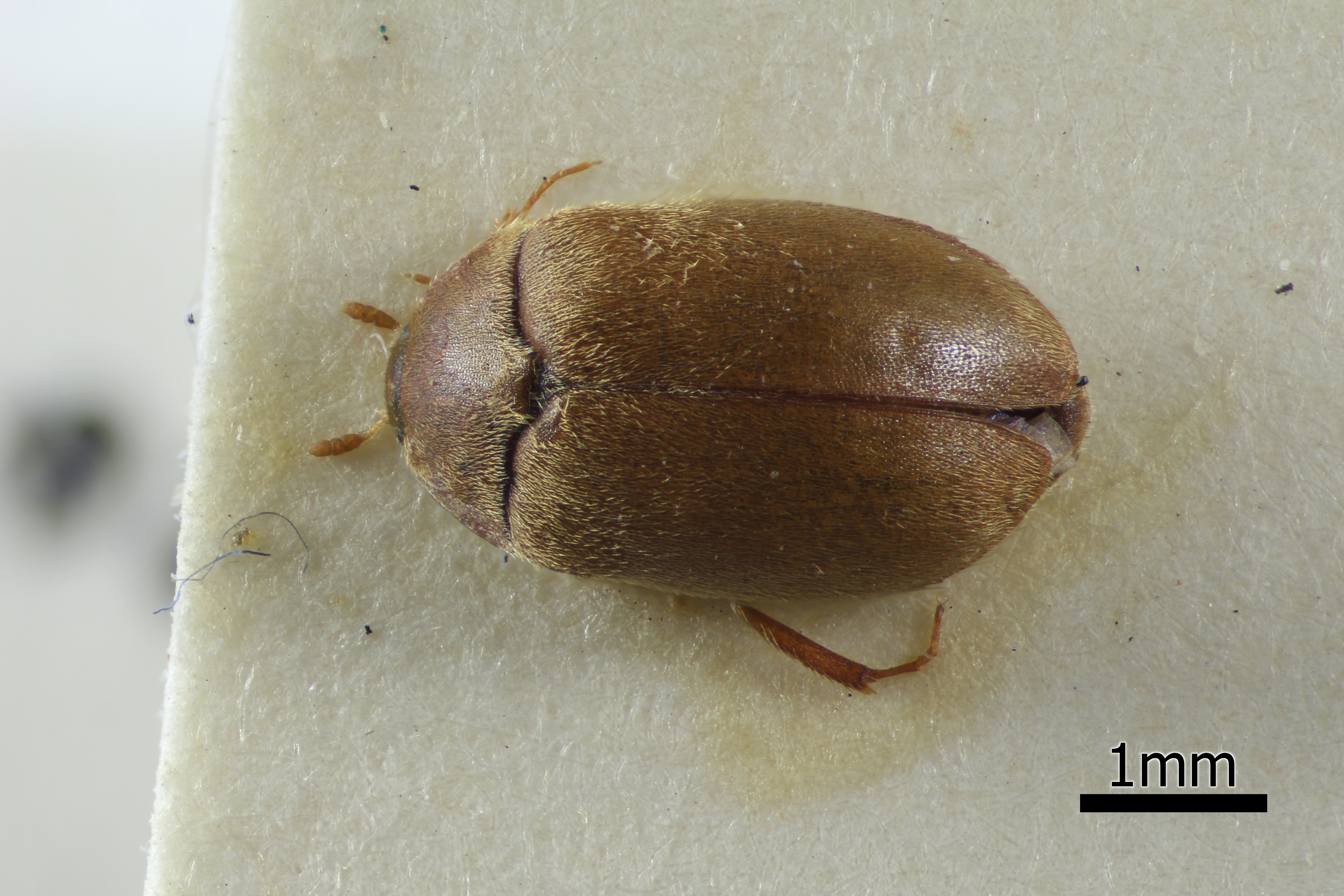

Scientific classification
- Kingdom: Animalia
- Phylum: Arthropoda
- Clade: Pancrustacea
- Class: Insecta
- Order: Coleoptera
- Suborder: Polyphaga
- Family: Dermestidae
- Genus: Attagenus
- Species: A. lobatus

Binomial name
- Attagenus lobatus Rosenhauer, 1856

= Attagenus lobatus =

Species of beetle

Attagenus lobatus is a species of carpet beetle in the subfamily Attageninae, family Dermestidae. It is found in several regions including:

- Asia: Afghanistan, China, India, Iran, Iraq, Kazakhstan, Kyrgyzstan, Mongolia, Pakistan, Russia, Saudi Arabia, Syria, Tajikistan, Turkmenistan, United Arab Emirates, Uzbekistan
- Europe: Bulgaria, Czech Republic (introduced), France, Greece, Italy (with Sardinia), Romania, Spain, Turkey, Ukraine
- North Africa: Algeria, Egypt, Morocco, Sudan, Tunisia
- North America: United States (introduced)
