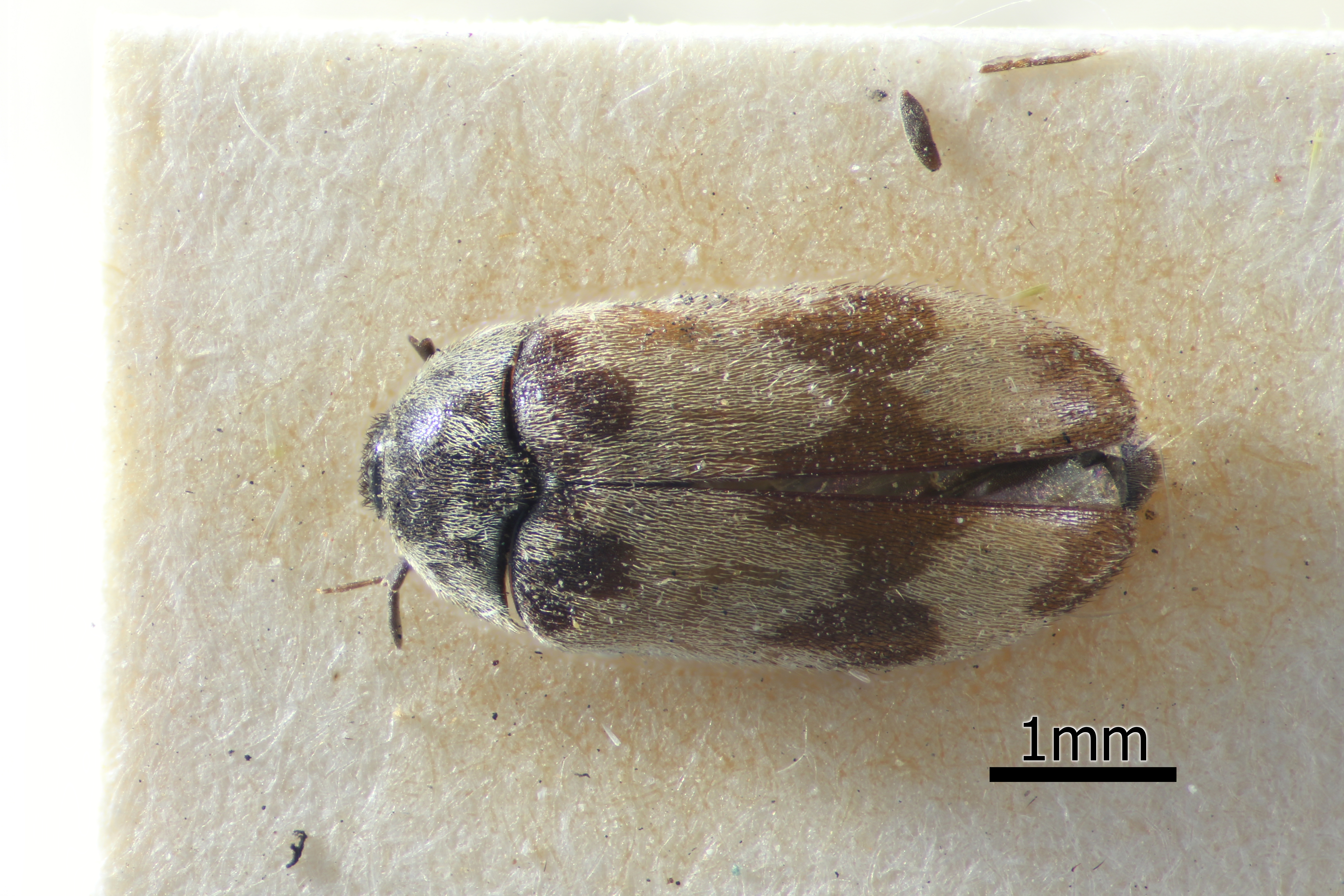

Scientific classification
- Kingdom: Animalia
- Phylum: Arthropoda
- Clade: Pancrustacea
- Class: Insecta
- Order: Coleoptera
- Suborder: Polyphaga
- Family: Dermestidae
- Genus: Attagenus
- Species: A. bifasciatus

Binomial name
- Attagenus bifasciatus (Olivier, 1790)

= Attagenus bifasciatus =

Species of beetle

Attagenus bifasciatus is a species of carpet beetle in the subfamily Attageninae, family Dermestidae.

It is known from:

- Southern Europe
- Asia: Afghanistan, Caucasus region, Turkey, Iran, Iraq, Israel, Lebanon, Palestine, Russia, Syria, Turkmenistan and possibly India (Kashmir, Uttar Pradesh)
- Africa: Algeria, Egypt, Libya, Morocco, Tunisia
