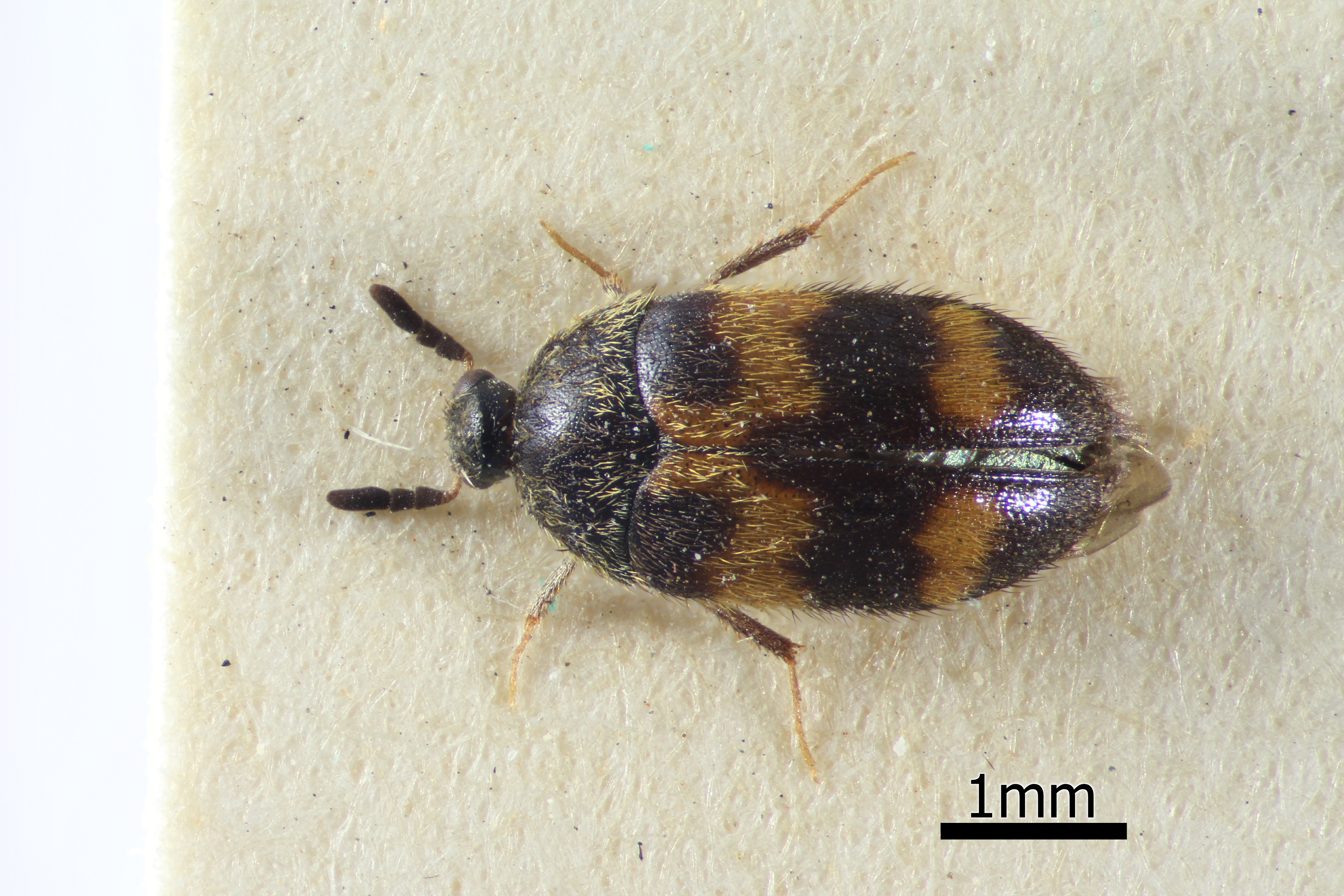

Scientific classification
- Kingdom: Animalia
- Phylum: Arthropoda
- Clade: Pancrustacea
- Class: Insecta
- Order: Coleoptera
- Suborder: Polyphaga
- Family: Dermestidae
- Genus: Attagenus
- Species: A. hottentotus

Binomial name
- Attagenus hottentotus (Guérin-Méneville, 1844)

= Attagenus hottentotus =

Species of beetle

Attagenus hottentotus is a species of carpet beetle in the subfamily Attageninae, family Dermestidae. It is found in Mozambique and South Africa.
