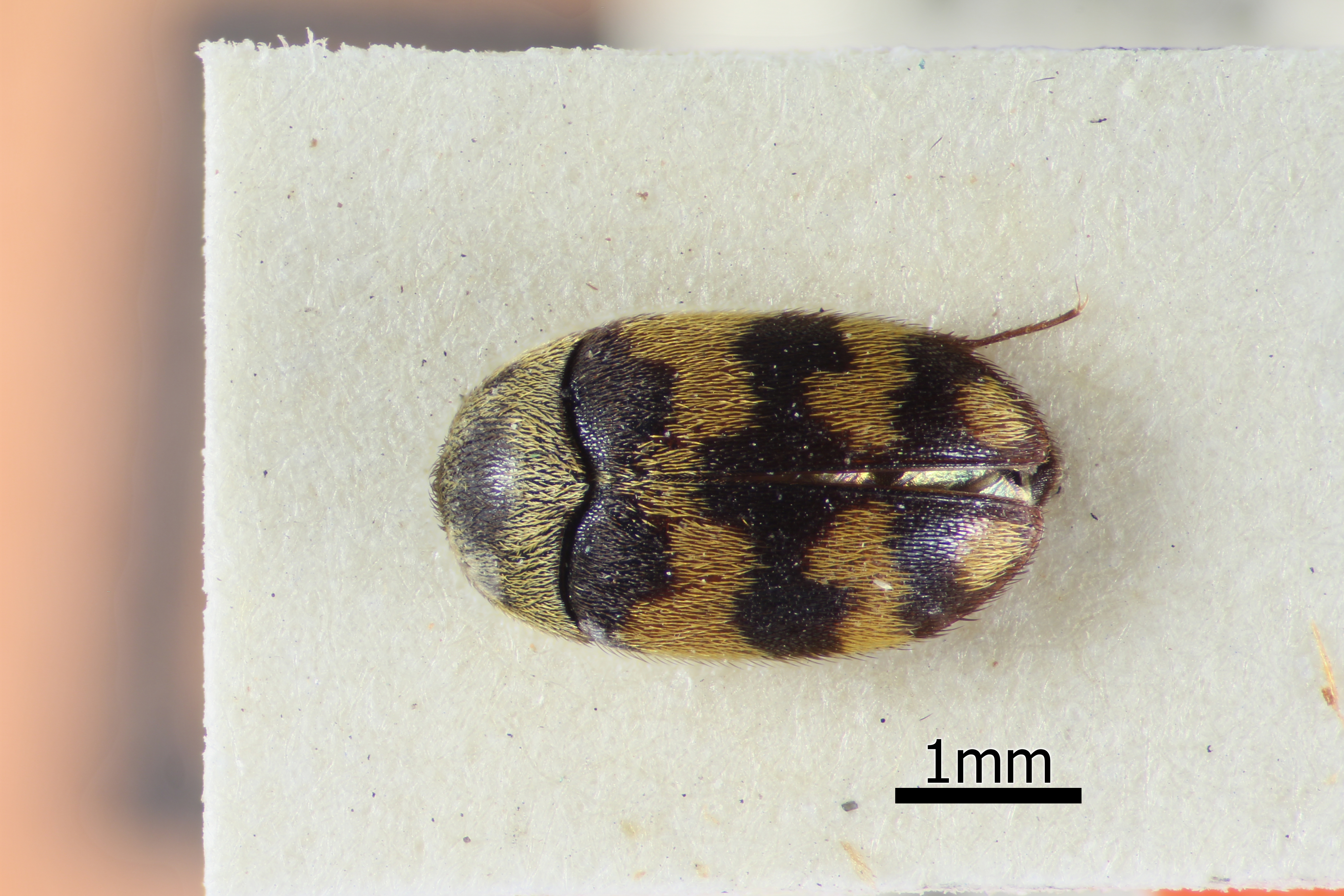

Scientific classification
- Kingdom: Animalia
- Phylum: Arthropoda
- Clade: Pancrustacea
- Class: Insecta
- Order: Coleoptera
- Suborder: Polyphaga
- Family: Dermestidae
- Genus: Attagenus
- Species: A. aurofasciatus

Binomial name
- Attagenus aurofasciatus Háva, 2005

= Attagenus aurofasciatus =

Species of beetle

Attagenus aurofasciatus is a species of carpet beetle in the subfamily Attageninae, family Dermestidae. It is native to Africa and has been recorded from Namibia and South Africa.

The species belongs to the genus Attagenus, a group of beetles whose larvae commonly feed on keratin-containing materials and other organic matter. Members of the family Dermestidae are generally small beetles and can be found in a variety of habitats, where both adults and larvae may have different feeding habits.

Attagenus aurofasciatus is distinguished taxonomically from other species of Attagenus by its morphological characteristics and was described as a distinct species within the family Dermestidae.
