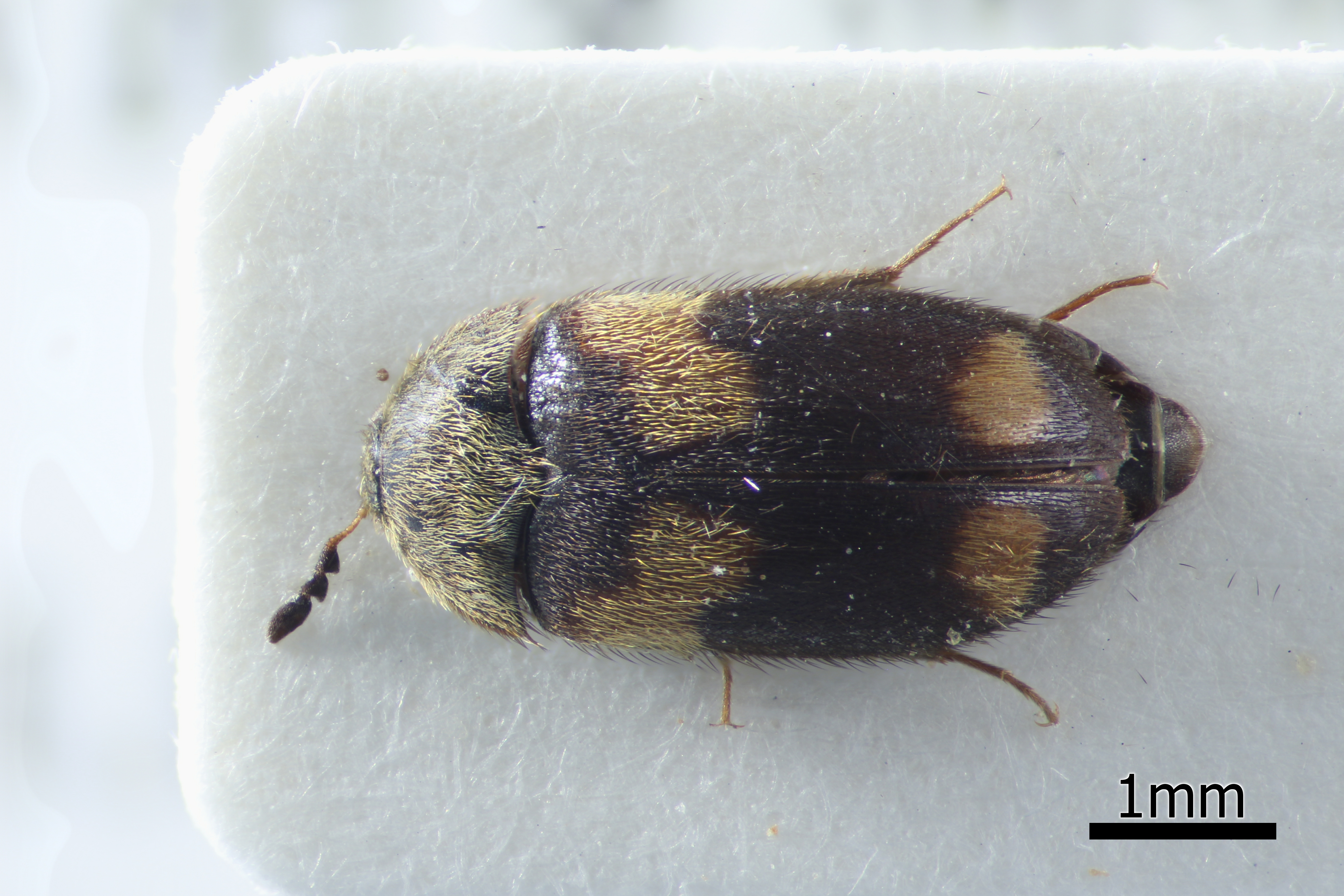

Scientific classification
- Kingdom: Animalia
- Phylum: Arthropoda
- Clade: Pancrustacea
- Class: Insecta
- Order: Coleoptera
- Suborder: Polyphaga
- Family: Dermestidae
- Genus: Attagenus
- Species: A. quadrimaculatus

Binomial name
- Attagenus quadrimaculatus Kraatz, 1858

= Attagenus quadrimaculatus =

Species of beetle

Attagenus quadrimaculatus is a species of carpet beetle in the subfamily Attageninae, family Dermestidae. It is generally found in the Mediterranean area. Confirmed records exist for Greece and France and it is possibly present in other countries such as:

- Europe: Albania, Bosnia and Herzegovina, Bulgaria, Croatia, Macedonia, Montenegro, Serbia, Slovenia, Switzerland, Turkey, Caucasus region
- Asia: Jordan, Lebanon
