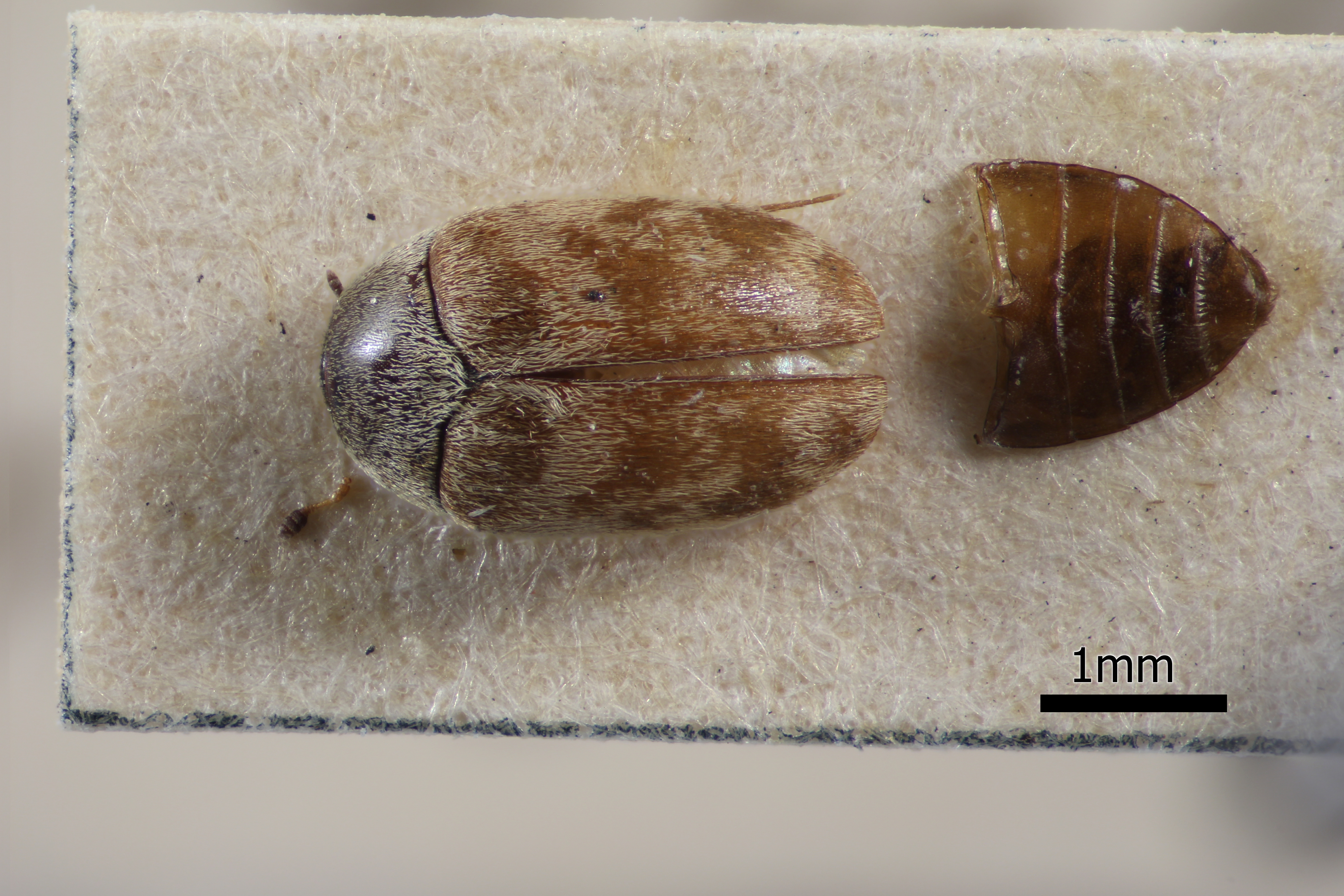

Scientific classification
- Kingdom: Animalia
- Phylum: Arthropoda
- Clade: Pancrustacea
- Class: Insecta
- Order: Coleoptera
- Suborder: Polyphaga
- Family: Dermestidae
- Genus: Attagenus
- Species: A. lynx

Binomial name
- Attagenus lynx Mulsant & Rey, 1868

= Attagenus lynx =

Species of beetle

Attagenus lynx is a species of carpet beetle in the subfamily Attageninae, family Dermestidae.

It is known from:

- Europe: Armenia, Azerbaijan, Finland (introduced), Poland (introduced), Turkey
- Africa: Egypt
- Asia: Caucasus region, Iran, Israel, Kazakhstan, Mongolia, Pakistan, Qatar, Russia, Saudi Arabia, Syria, Tajikistan, Turkmenistan, Uzbekistan
