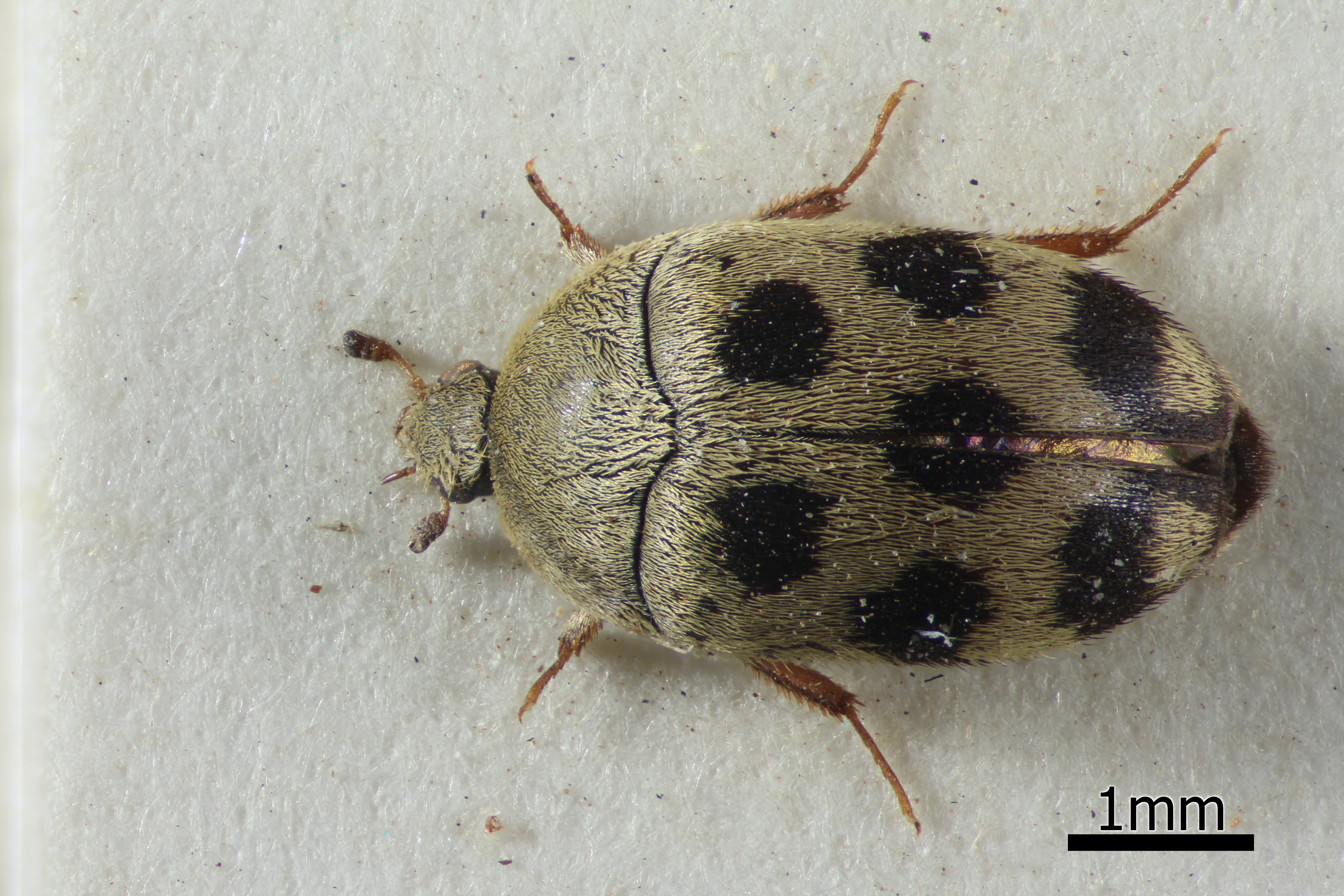

Scientific classification
- Kingdom: Animalia
- Phylum: Arthropoda
- Clade: Pancrustacea
- Class: Insecta
- Order: Coleoptera
- Suborder: Polyphaga
- Family: Dermestidae
- Genus: Attagenus
- Species: A. pardus

Binomial name
- Attagenus pardus Arrow, 1915

= Attagenus pardus =

Species of beetle

Attagenus pardus is a species of carpet beetle in the subfamily Attageninae, family Dermestidae. It is present in Africa: Botswana, Namibia, South Africa, Tanzania, Zimbabwe.
