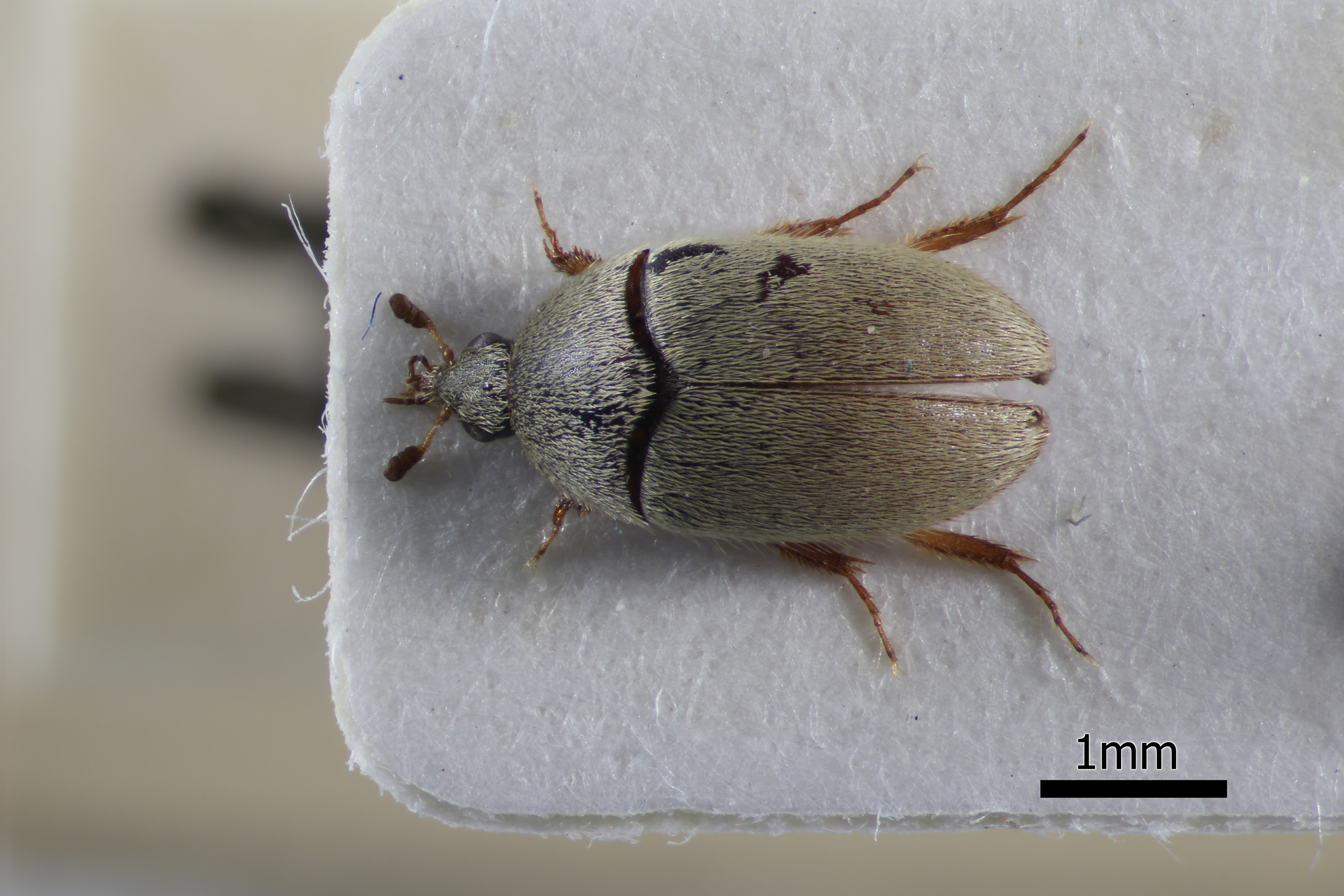

Scientific classification
- Kingdom: Animalia
- Phylum: Arthropoda
- Clade: Pancrustacea
- Class: Insecta
- Order: Coleoptera
- Suborder: Polyphaga
- Family: Dermestidae
- Genus: Attagenus
- Species: A. seniculus

Binomial name
- Attagenus seniculus (Solsky, 1876)

= Attagenus seniculus =

Species of beetle

Attagenus seniculus is a species of carpet beetle in the subfamily Attageninae, family Dermestidae. It is found in Asia: Caucasus region, Turkey, Iran, Afghanistan, Tajikistan, Turkmenistan, Uzbekistan, Mongolia.
