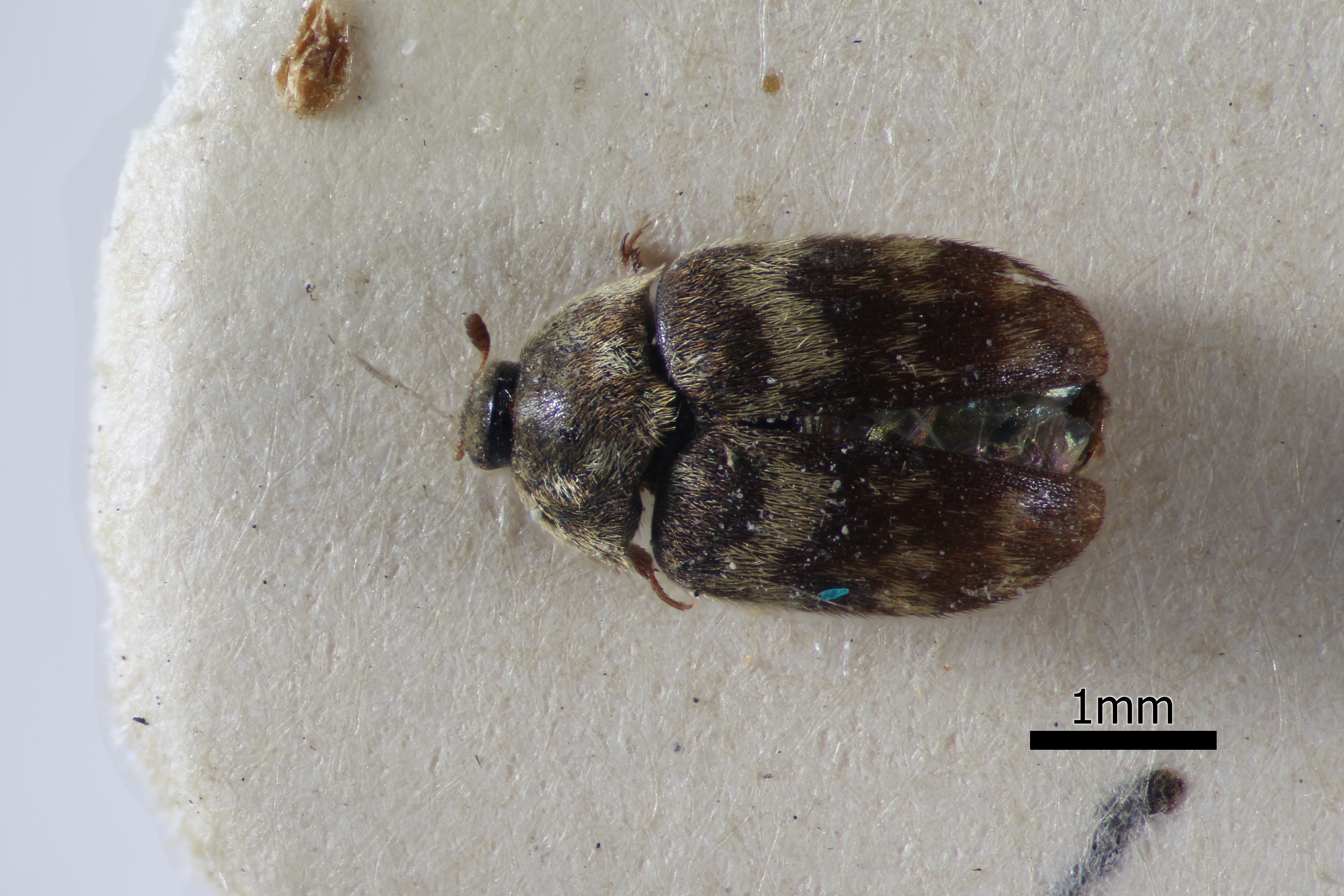

Scientific classification
- Kingdom: Animalia
- Phylum: Arthropoda
- Clade: Pancrustacea
- Class: Insecta
- Order: Coleoptera
- Suborder: Polyphaga
- Family: Dermestidae
- Genus: Attagenus
- Species: A. scalaris

Binomial name
- Attagenus scalaris (Pic, 1894)

= Attagenus scalaris =

Species of beetle

Attagenus scalaris is a species of carpet beetle in the subfamily Attageninae, family Dermestidae. It is found in Africa (Egypt and Libya), as well as in Middle East (Israel and Saudi Arabia).
