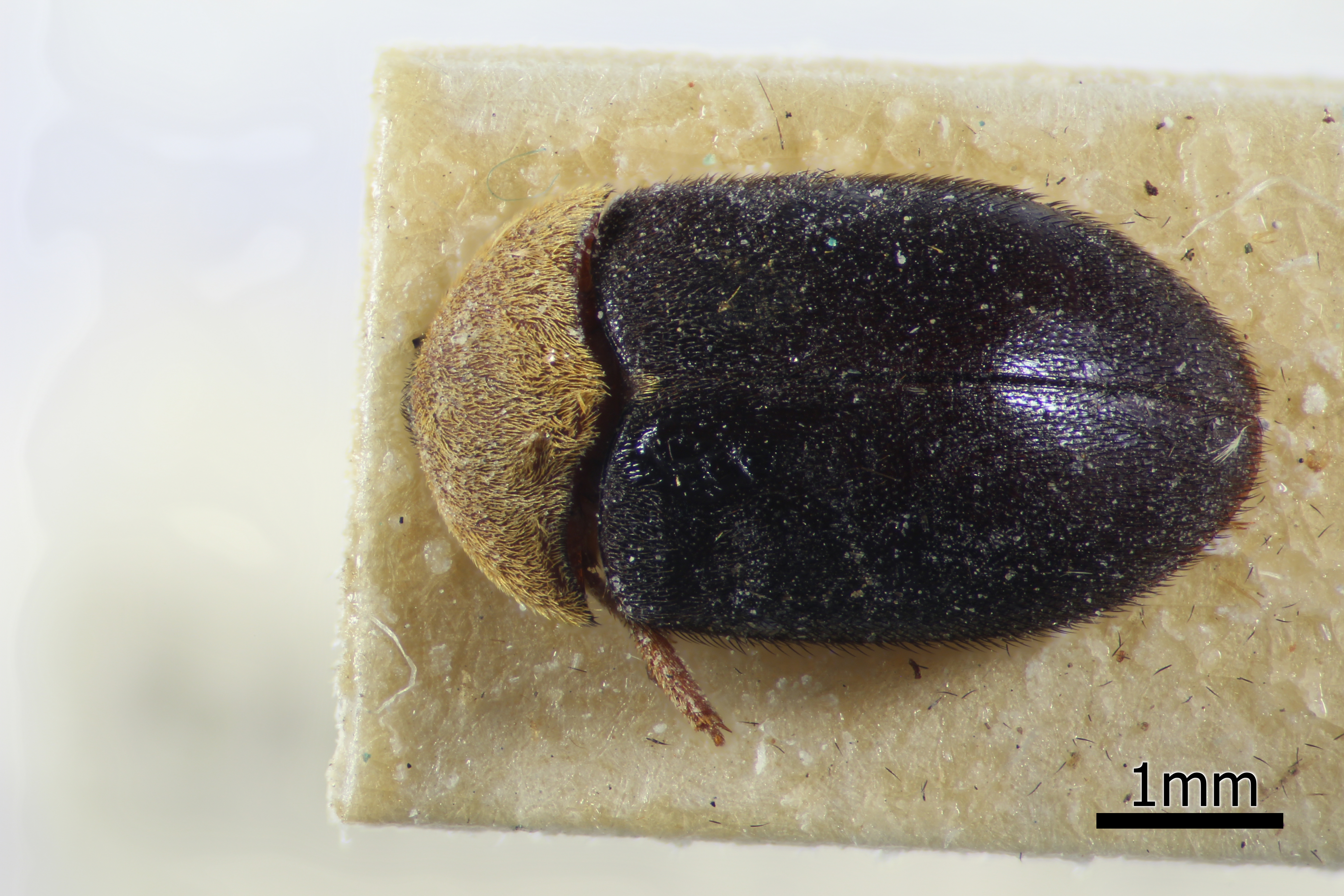

Scientific classification
- Kingdom: Animalia
- Phylum: Arthropoda
- Clade: Pancrustacea
- Class: Insecta
- Order: Coleoptera
- Suborder: Polyphaga
- Family: Dermestidae
- Genus: Attagenus
- Species: A. atripennis

Binomial name
- Attagenus atripennis Pic, 1938

= Attagenus atripennis =

Species of beetle

Attagenus atripennis is a species of carpet beetle in the subfamily Attageninae, family Dermestidae. It is found in Ethiopia, Saudi Arabia and Yemen.
