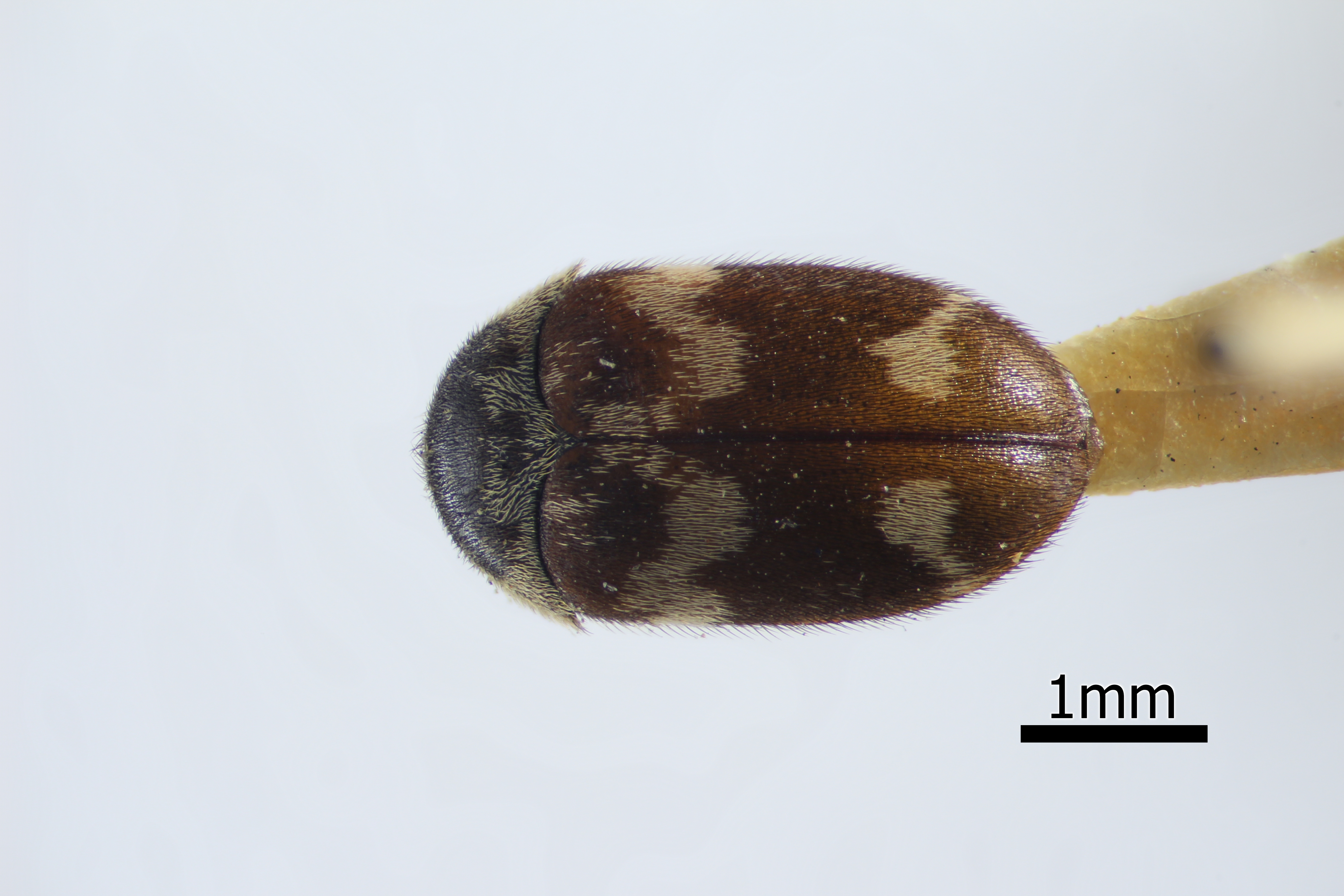

Scientific classification
- Kingdom: Animalia
- Phylum: Arthropoda
- Clade: Pancrustacea
- Class: Insecta
- Order: Coleoptera
- Suborder: Polyphaga
- Family: Dermestidae
- Genus: Attagenus
- Species: A. fallax

Binomial name
- Attagenus fallax Gené, 1839

= Attagenus fallax =

Species of beetle

Attagenus fallax is a species of carpet beetle in the subfamily Attageninae, family Dermestidae.

It is found in:

- Europe: Croatia, France, Greece, Italy, Portugal, Sardinia, Sicily, Spain
- Africa: Algeria, Egypt, Libya, Morocco, Tunisia
