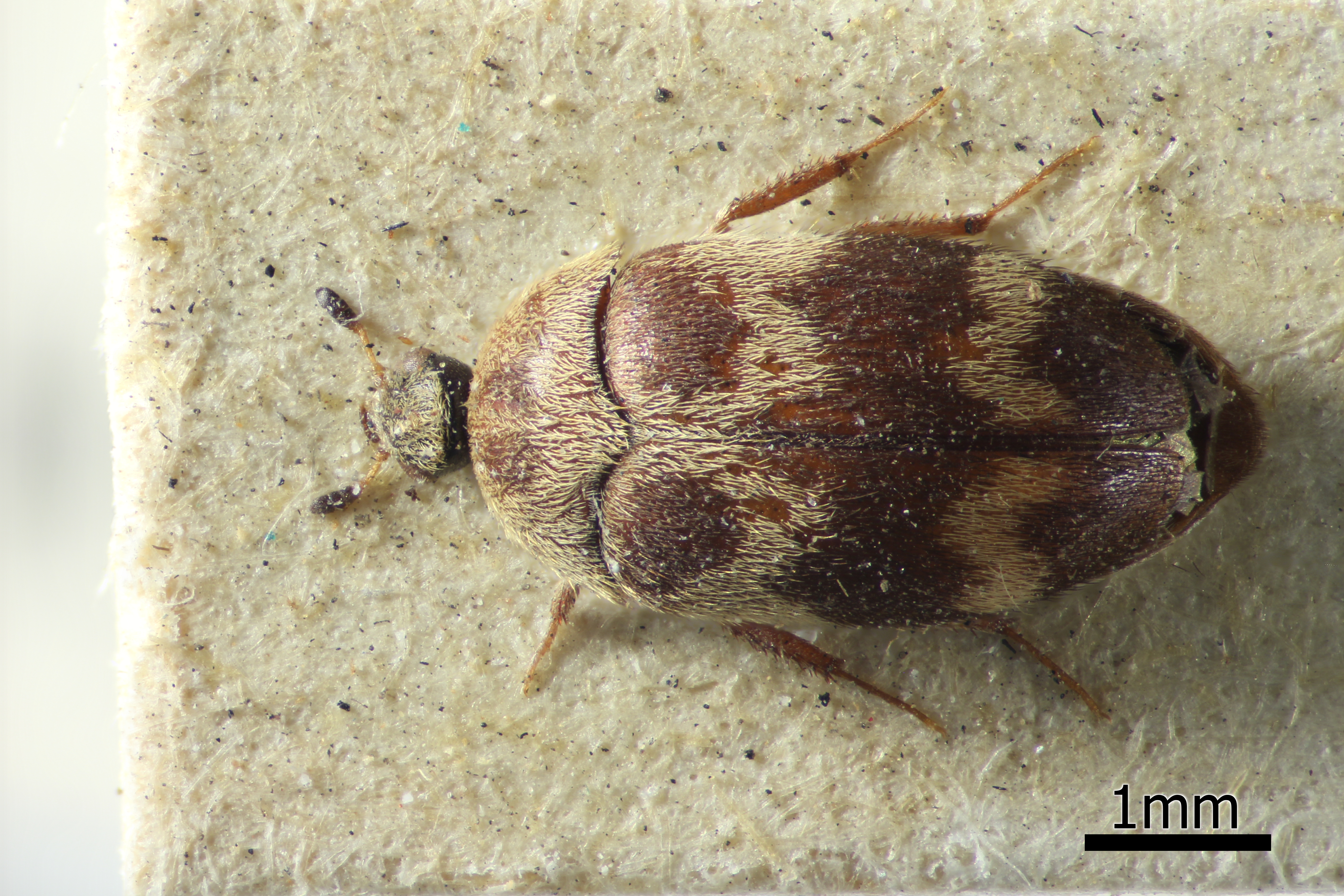

Scientific classification
- Kingdom: Animalia
- Phylum: Arthropoda
- Clade: Pancrustacea
- Class: Insecta
- Order: Coleoptera
- Suborder: Polyphaga
- Family: Dermestidae
- Genus: Attagenus
- Species: A. jucundus

Binomial name
- Attagenus jucundus Péringuey, 1885

= Attagenus jucundus =

Species of beetle

Attagenus jucundus is a species of carpet beetle in the subfamily Attageninae, family Dermestidae. It is found in Africa: Mozambique, Namibia, South Africa and Zambia.
