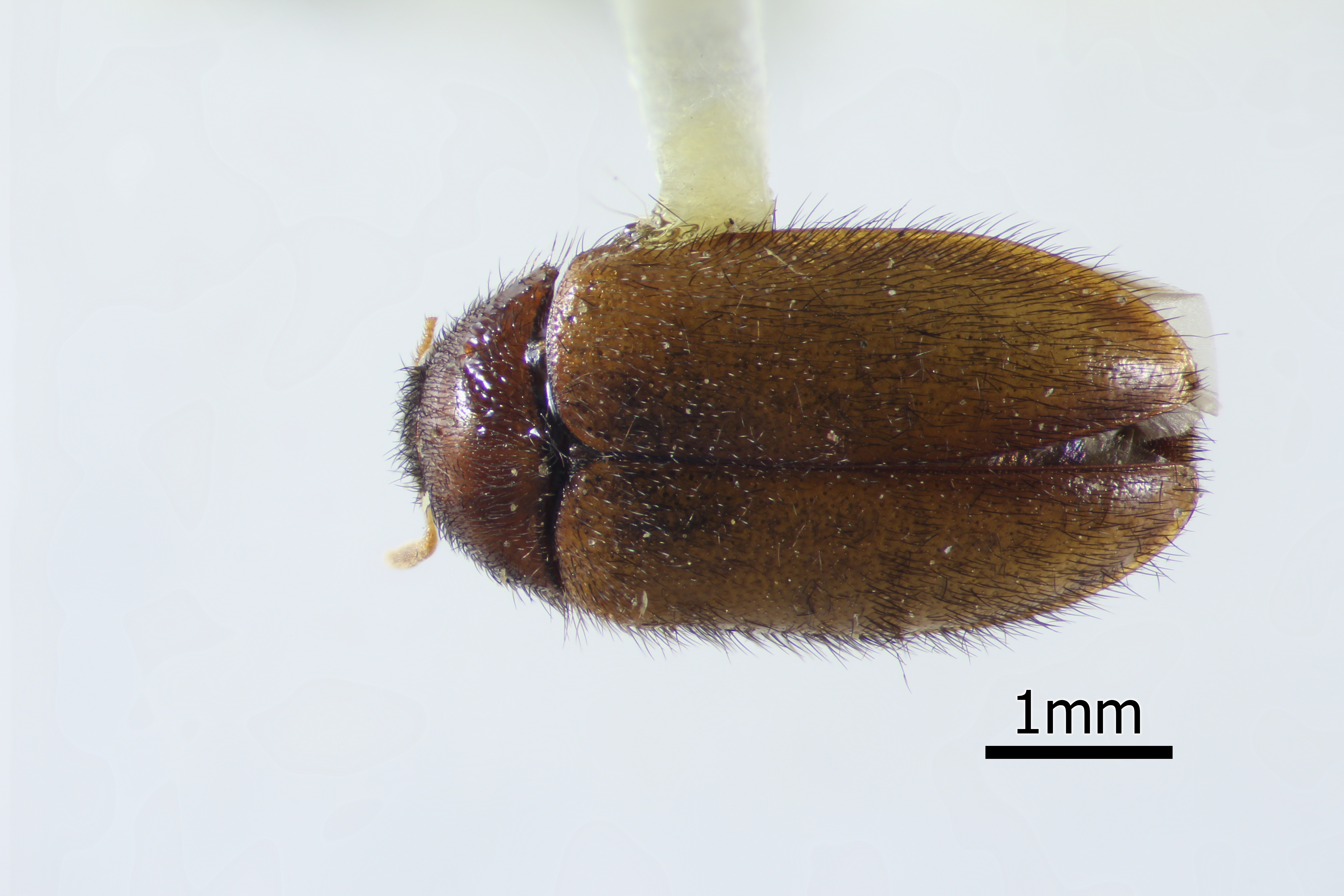

Scientific classification
- Kingdom: Animalia
- Phylum: Arthropoda
- Clade: Pancrustacea
- Class: Insecta
- Order: Coleoptera
- Suborder: Polyphaga
- Family: Dermestidae
- Genus: Attagenus
- Species: A. bicolor

Binomial name
- Attagenus bicolor Harold, 1868

= Attagenus bicolor =

Species of beetle

Attagenus bicolor is a species of carpet beetle in the subfamily Attageninae, family Dermestidae. It is known from United States (Arizona, Colorado, Nevada, New Mexico, Utah, Wyoming).
