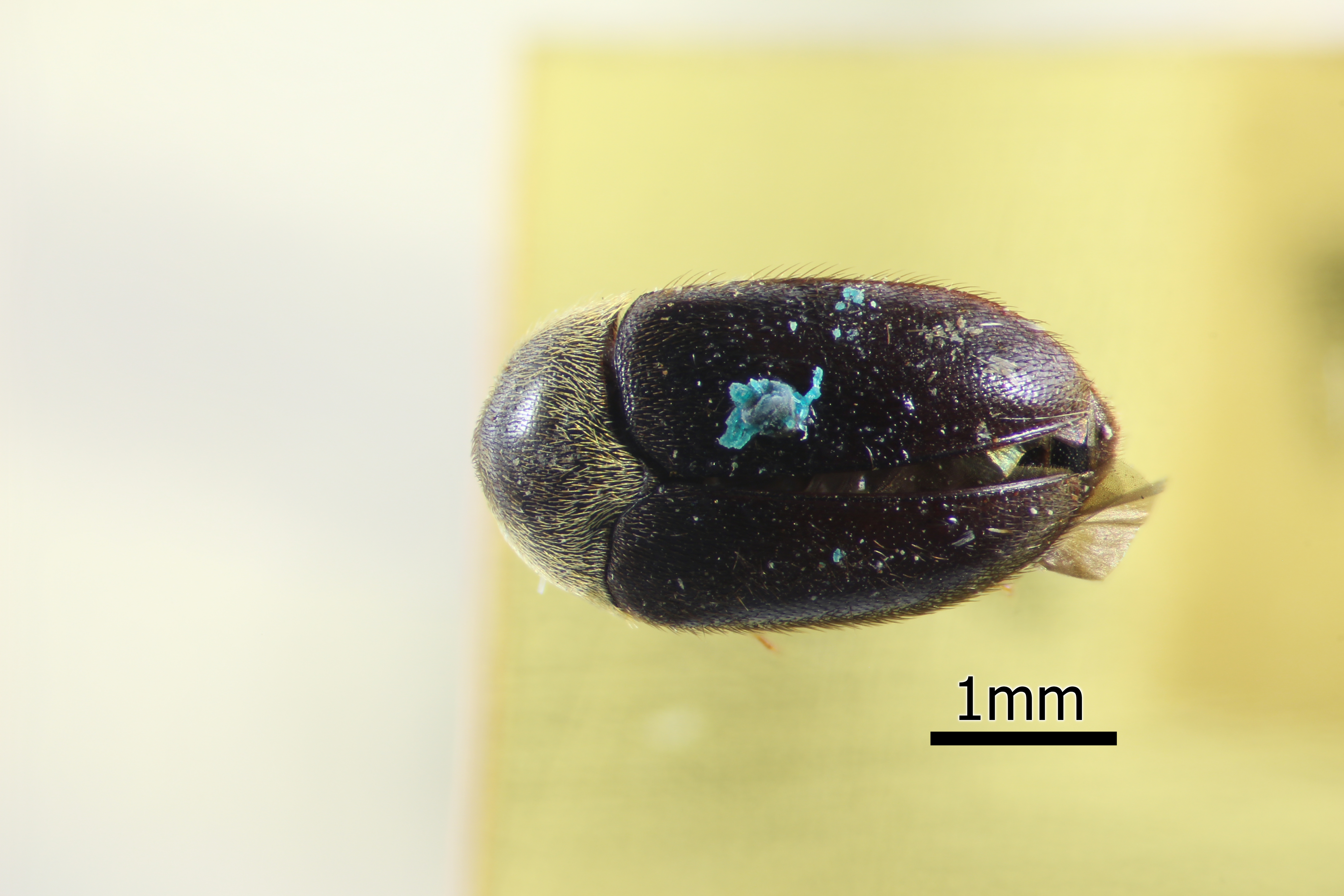

Scientific classification
- Kingdom: Animalia
- Phylum: Arthropoda
- Clade: Pancrustacea
- Class: Insecta
- Order: Coleoptera
- Suborder: Polyphaga
- Family: Dermestidae
- Genus: Attagenus
- Species: A. nigripennis

Binomial name
- Attagenus nigripennis Arrow, 1915

= Attagenus nigripennis =

Species of beetle

Attagenus nigripennis is a species of carpet beetle in the subfamily Attageninae, family Dermestidae. It is found in Africa: Congo, Ghana and Ivory Coast.
