= Attagenus turcomanus =

Scientific classification
- Kingdom: Animalia
- Phylum: Arthropoda
- Clade: Pancrustacea
- Class: Insecta
- Order: Coleoptera
- Suborder: Polyphaga
- Family: Dermestidae
- Genus: Attagenus
- Species: A. turcomanus

Binomial name
- Attagenus turcomanus Zhantiev, 1963

Species of beetle

Attagenus turcomanus is a species of beetle that belongs to the family of skin beetles (Dermestidae). It was described in 1963 by Rustem Devletovich Zhantiev. It is known from Turkmenistan.
