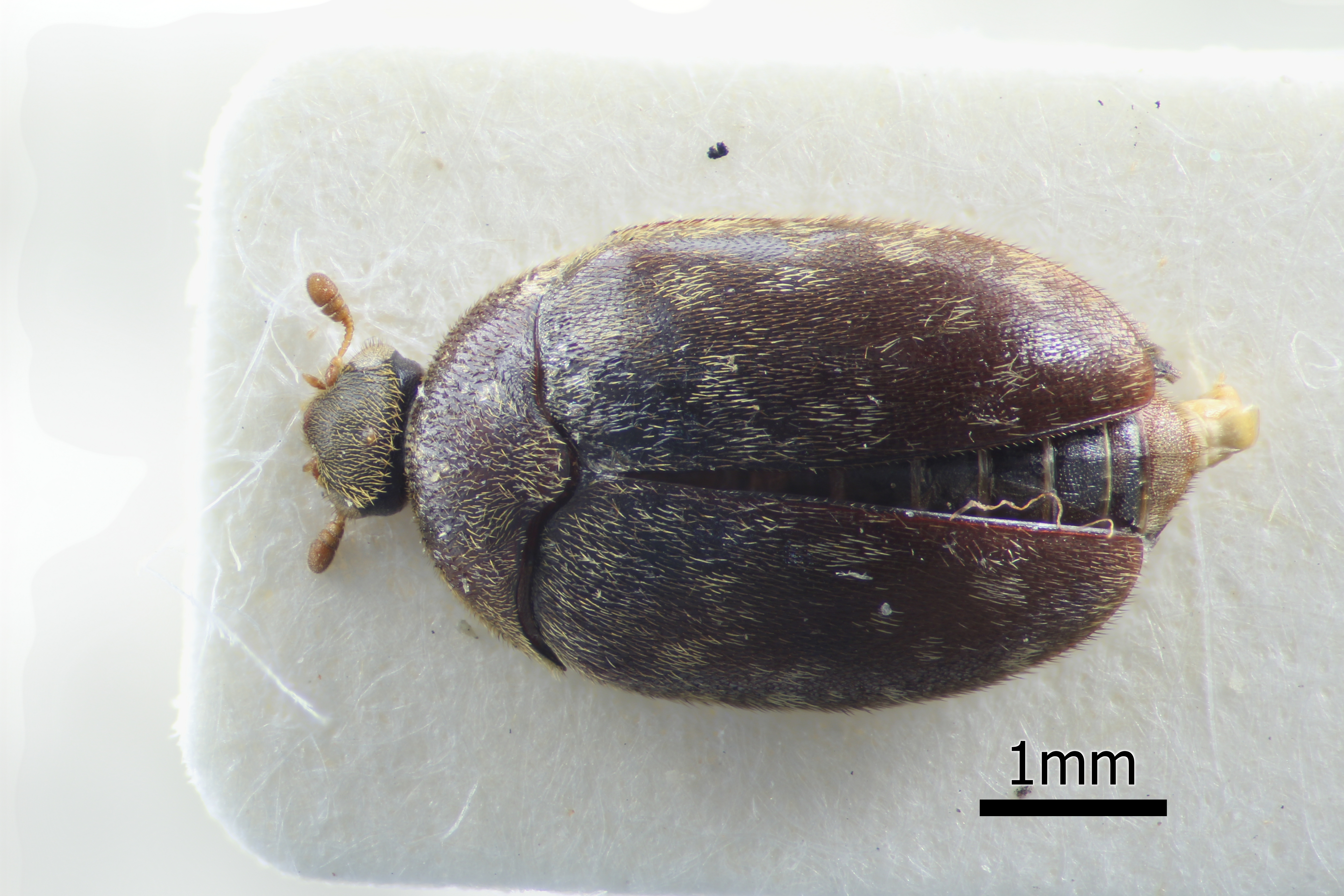

Scientific classification
- Kingdom: Animalia
- Phylum: Arthropoda
- Clade: Pancrustacea
- Class: Insecta
- Order: Coleoptera
- Suborder: Polyphaga
- Family: Dermestidae
- Genus: Attagenus
- Species: A. undulatus

Binomial name
- Attagenus undulatus (Motschulsky, 1858)

Synonyms
- Aethriostoma undulata Motschulsky, 1858; Attagenus rufipes Walker, 1859; Pseudotelopes simoni Pic, 1916; Pseudotelopes testaceipes Pic, 1916

= Attagenus undulatus =

Species of beetle

Attagenus (Aethriostoma) undulatus, commonly known as the Dermestid beetle, is a species of skin beetle found in Comoros, Madagascar, Mauritius, Seychelles, Buru Island, Cambodia, southern China, India, Indonesia, Laos, Malaysia, Myanmar, Philippines, Sri Lanka, Thailand, Vietnam, Hawaiian Islands, Papua New Guinea, and South Mariana Islands. It has introduced to Chile mainly through goods of human beings.

Body length is about 3 mm.
