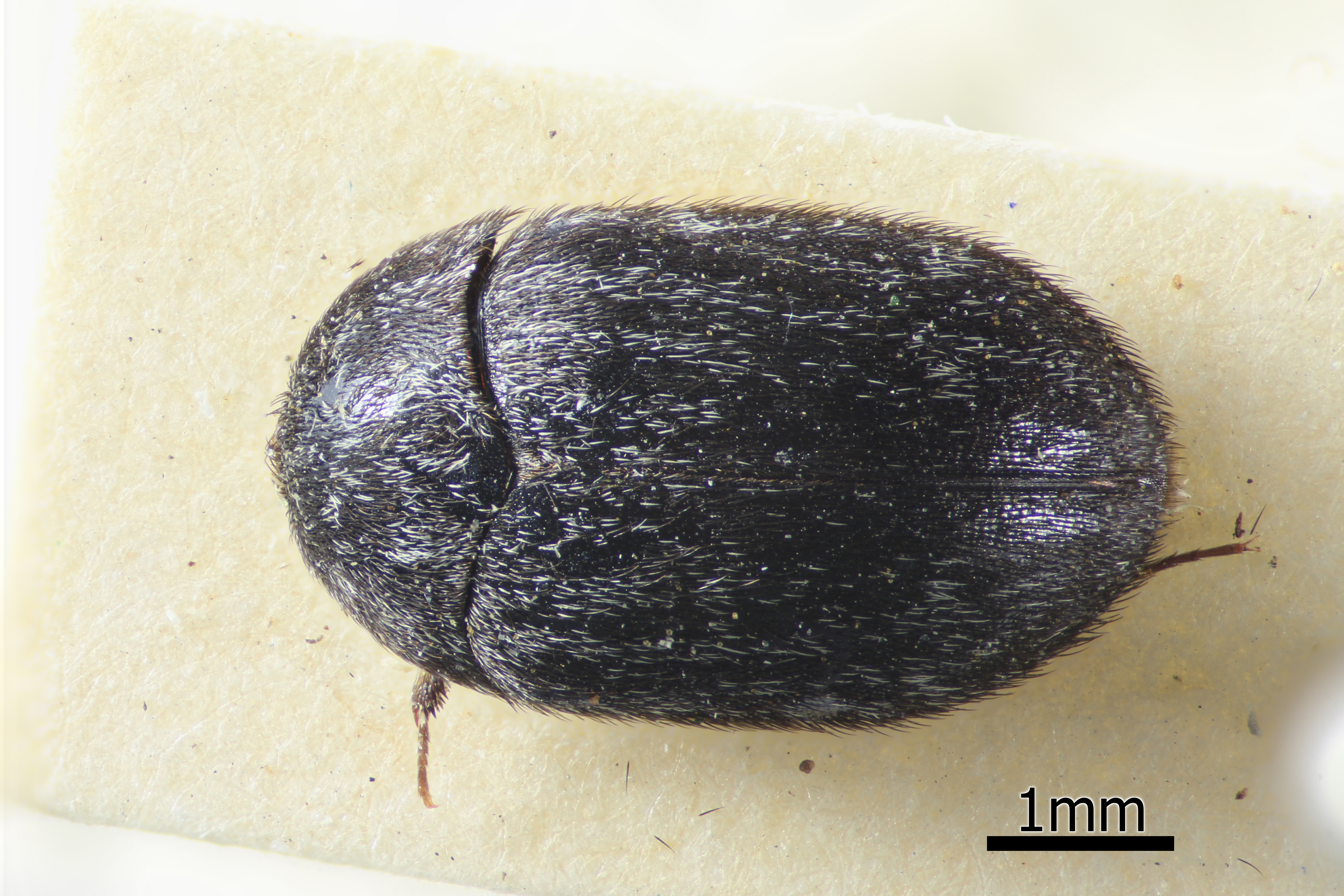

Scientific classification
- Kingdom: Animalia
- Phylum: Arthropoda
- Clade: Pancrustacea
- Class: Insecta
- Order: Coleoptera
- Suborder: Polyphaga
- Family: Dermestidae
- Genus: Attagenus
- Species: A. capensis

Binomial name
- Attagenus capensis Reitter, 1881

= Attagenus capensis =

Species of beetle

Attagenus capensis is a species of carpet beetle in the subfamily Attageninae, family Dermestidae. It is found in South Africa.
