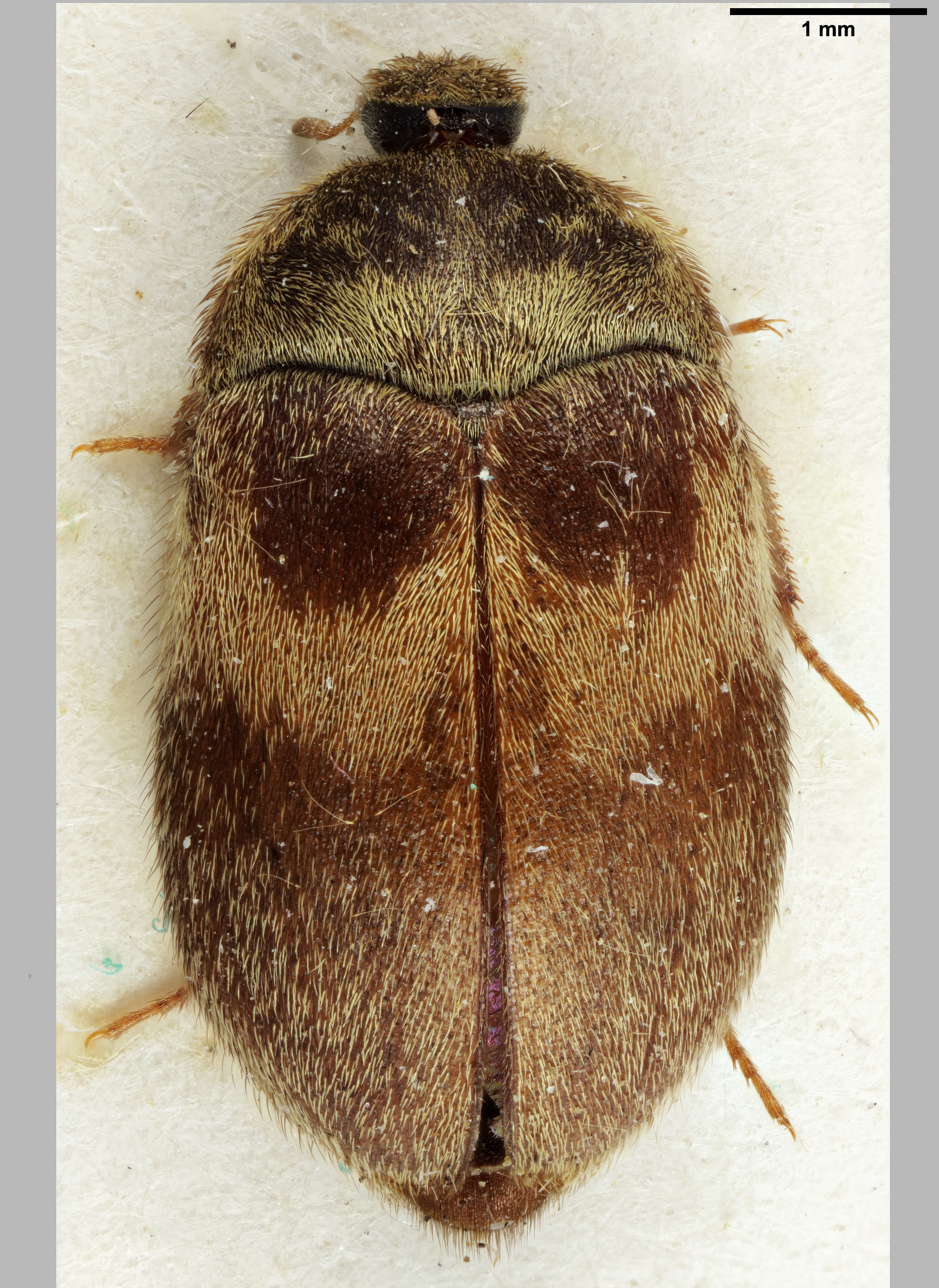

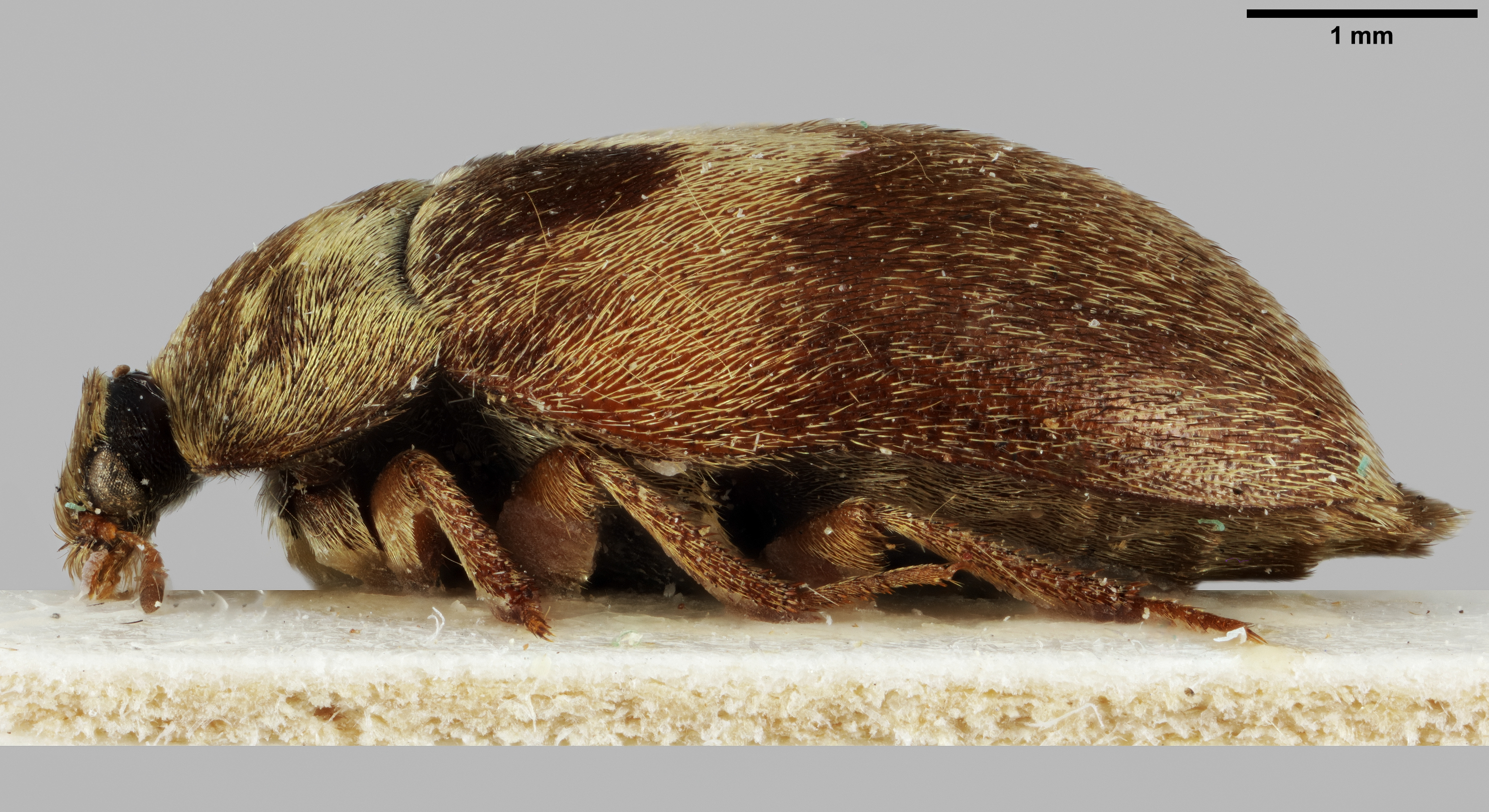

Scientific classification
- Kingdom: Animalia
- Phylum: Arthropoda
- Clade: Pancrustacea
- Class: Insecta
- Order: Coleoptera
- Suborder: Polyphaga
- Family: Dermestidae
- Genus: Attagenus
- Species: A. woodroffei

Binomial name
- Attagenus woodroffei Halstead & Green, 1979

= Attagenus woodroffei =

Species of beetle

Attagenus woodroffei is a species of carpet beetle in the subfamily Attageninae, family Dermestidae. It is generally found in Denmark, Finland, Iceland, Norway and Sweden. The species has been introduced to Czech Republic, Germany, Ukraine and Israel. Visually it is very similar to a nearly cosmopolitan species, Attagenus fasciatus.

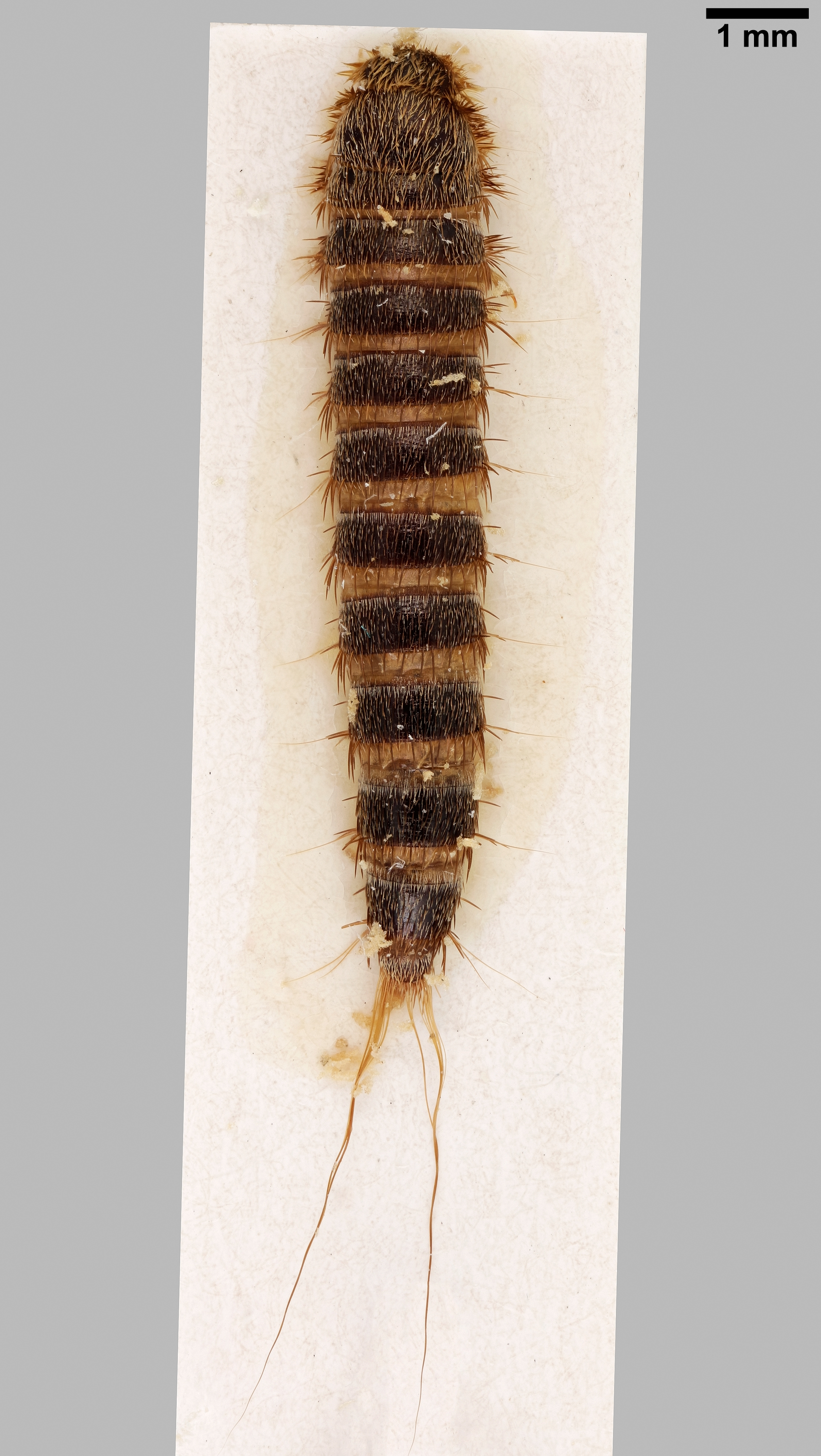
Larva of A. woodroffei
