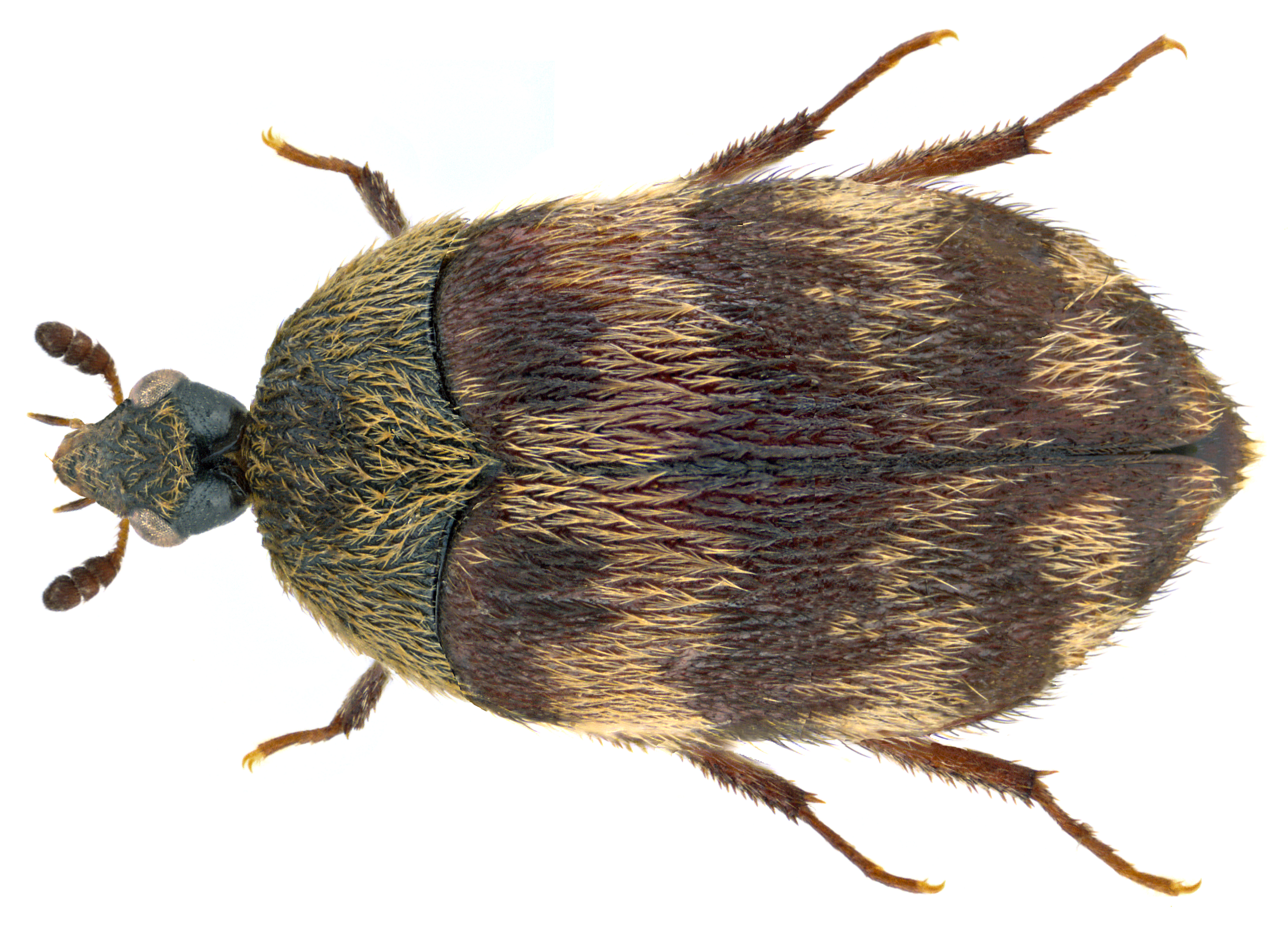

Scientific classification
- Kingdom: Animalia
- Phylum: Arthropoda
- Clade: Pancrustacea
- Class: Insecta
- Order: Coleoptera
- Suborder: Polyphaga
- Family: Dermestidae
- Genus: Attagenus
- Species: A. trifasciatus

Binomial name
- Attagenus trifasciatus (Fabricius, 1787)

= Attagenus trifasciatus =

Species of beetle

Attagenus trifasciatus is a species of carpet beetle in the subfamily Attageninae, family Dermestidae.

It is known from:

- Europe: Bosnia and Herzegovina, Croatia, England (introduced), France, Germany (introduced), Italy, Monaco, Scotland (introduced), Spain, Switzerland, Portugal
- Africa: Algeria, Egypt, Morocco, Tunisia.

Possibly present in Chad and Israel.
