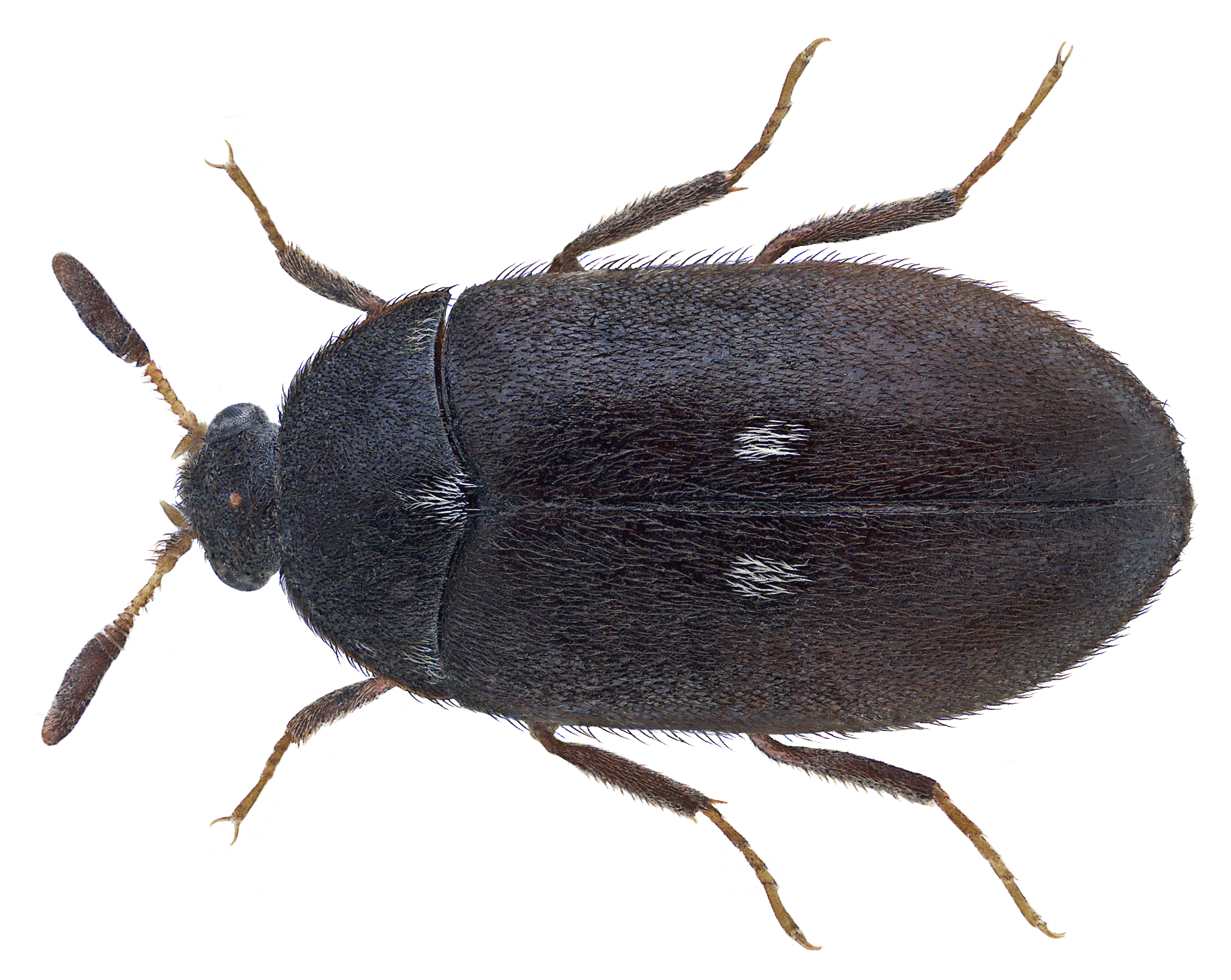
- Attagenus pellio

Scientific classification
- Kingdom: Animalia
- Phylum: Arthropoda
- Clade: Pancrustacea
- Class: Insecta
- Order: Coleoptera
- Suborder: Polyphaga
- Family: Dermestidae
- Subfamily: Attageninae
- Tribe: Attagenini
- Genus: Attagenus; Latreille, 1802

= Attagenus =

Attagenus Temporal range: Cenomanian–Present

Genus of beetles

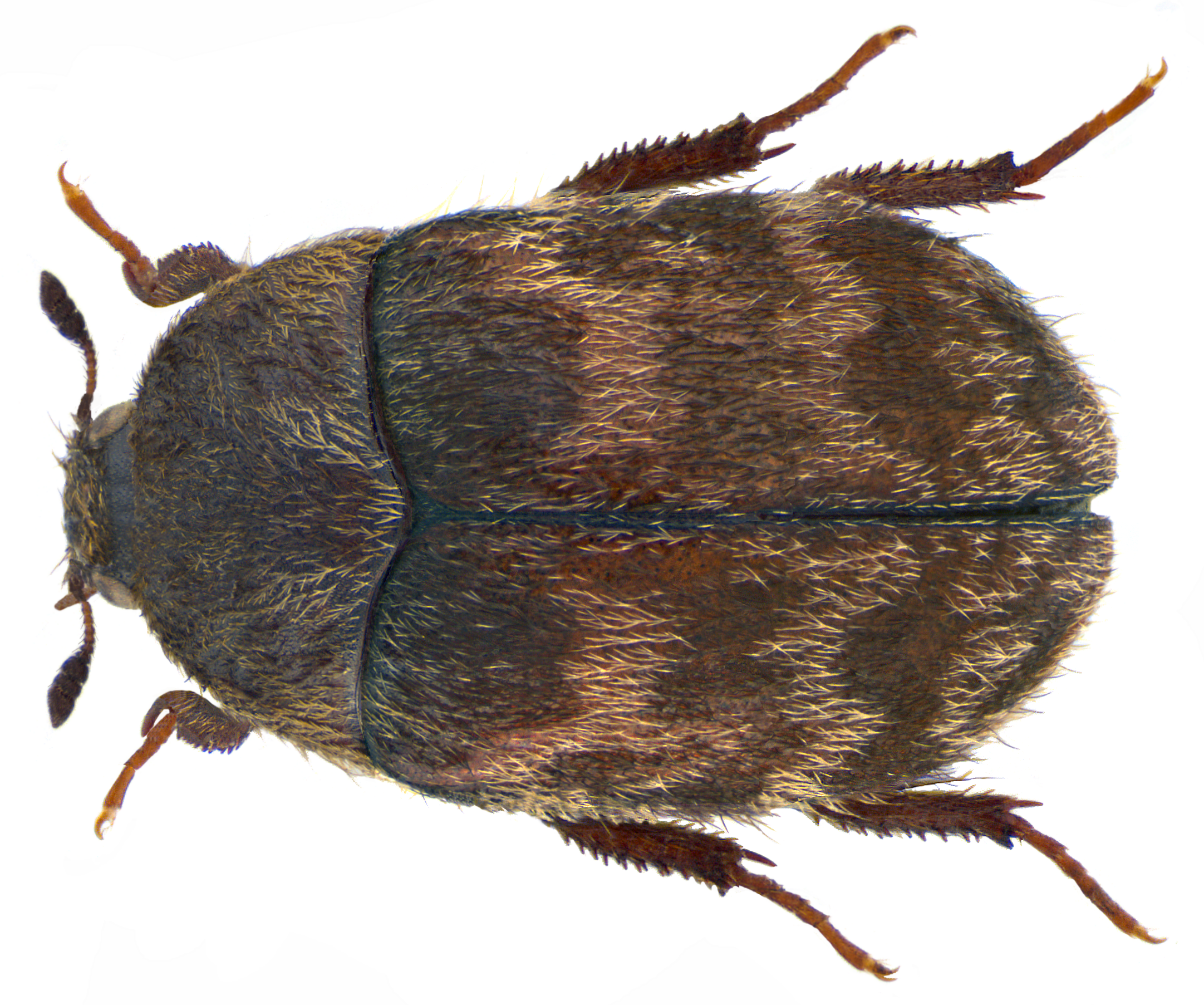
Attagenus civetta

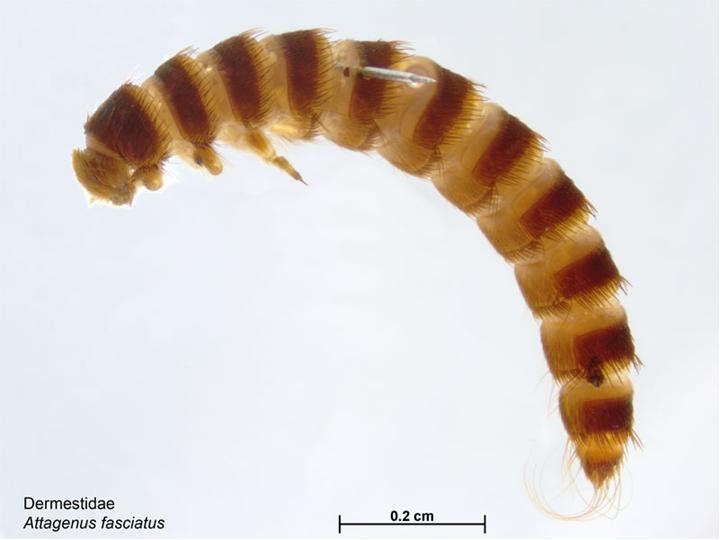
Attagenus fasciatus larva

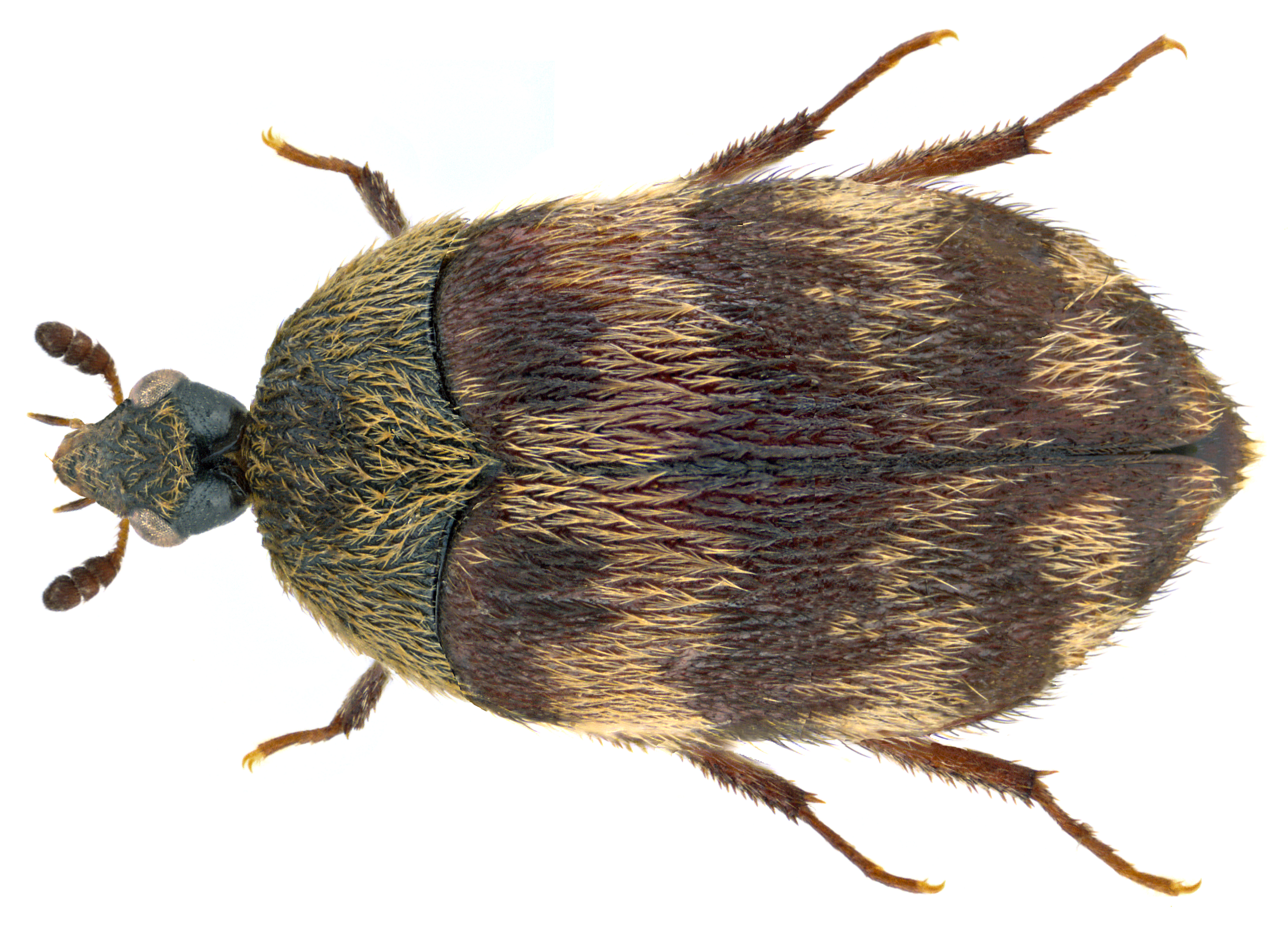
Attagenus trifasciatus

Attagenus is a genus of beetles. Species of the genus are found in tropical Africa, Europe, the Near East, the Nearctic, North Africa and East Asia. There are nearly 200 species. The genus has existed for at least 99 million years, with fossils known from the Cenomanian aged Burmese amber and Turonian aged New Jersey amber.

Species include:

- Attagenus abbreviatus Heer, 1856
- Attagenus aboriginalis Wickham, 1913
- Attagenus addendus J. Sahlberg, 1903
- Attagenus adspersus Blanchard, 1843
- Attagenus aeneus Roth, 1851
- Attagenus afghanus Háva, 2000
- Attagenus africanus Mroczkowski, 1958
- Attagenus albofasciatus Dahl, 1823
- Attagenus albonotatus Pic, 1927
- Attagenus ambericus Háva & Prokop, 2004
- Attagenus antennatus Laporte, 1840
- Attagenus anthrenoides Wollaston, 1864
- Attagenus apicalis Pic, 1942
- Attagenus apicebrunneus Kalík, 1955
- Attagenus arboreus Zhantiev, 2007
- Attagenus arcuatefasciatus Pic, 1951
- Attagenus aristidis Pic, 1894
- Attagenus asmaranus Pic, 1942
- Attagenus assuanensis Pic, 1899
- Attagenus astacurus Peyerimhoff, 1931
- Attagenus atricolor Pic, 1931
- Attagenus atripennis Pic, 1938
- Attagenus attenuatus Pic, 1894
- Attagenus augustatus Ballion, 1871
- Attagenus aurantiacus Reitter, 1900
- Attagenus aurofasciatus Háva, 2005
- Attagenus australis Montrouzier, 1860
- Attagenus barbieri Pic, 1946
- Attagenus basalis Pic, 1928
- Attagenus basimaculatus Pic, 1952
- Attagenus beali Zhantiev, 2005
- Attagenus bezdeki Háva & Kadej, 2007
- Attagenus bicolor Harold, 1868
- Attagenus bifasciatus Olivier, 1790
- Attagenus birmanicus Arrow, 1915
- Attagenus biskrensis Pic, 1904
- Attagenus brittoni Kalík, 1954
- Attagenus brunneonotatus Pic, 1894
- Attagenus brunneopunctatus Pic, 1893
- Attagenus brunnescens Pic, 1904
- Attagenus brunneus Faldermann, 1835
- Attagenus calabricus Reitter, 1881
- Attagenus capensis Reitter, 1881
- Attagenus caracal Zhantiev, 1963
- Attagenus chakouri Pic, 1907
- Attagenus cinereus Thunberg, 1815
- Attagenus civetta Mulsant & Rey, 1868
- Attagenus conradsi Pic, 1951
- Attagenus coquereli Mulsant & Rey, 1868
- Attagenus cuneatus Zhantiev, 2007
- Attagenus curvicornis J. Sahlberg, 1913
- Attagenus cyphonoides Reitter, 1881
- Attagenus decoloratus Mulsant & Rey, 1868
- Attagenus dichrous Roth, 1851
- Attagenus dispar (Redtenbacher, 1843)
- Attagenus diversepubescens Pic, 1936
- Attagenus diversesignatus Pic, 1942
- Attagenus diversus Reitter, 1881
- Attagenus donckieri Pic, 1916
- Attagenus doricus Zhantiev, 2007
- Attagenus duplex Reitter in Heyden, 1890
- Attagenus endroedyi Háva, 2003
- Attagenus ensicornis Wollaston, 1867
- Attagenus eremivagus Peyerimhoff, 1943
- Attagenus erevanicus Zhantiev, 1963
- Attagenus extinctus C. Heyden & L. Heyden, 1865
- Attagenus fairmairei Mroczkowski, 1958
- Attagenus fallax Gené, 1839
- Attagenus fasciatopunctatus Reitter, 1881
- Attagenus fasciatus Thunberg, 1795 – wardrobe beetle
- Attagenus fasciolatus Solsky, 1876
- Attagenus flexicollis Reitter, 1881
- Attagenus fortis Zhantiev, 2007
- Attagenus fossor Zhantiev, 2005
- Attagenus fulvicollis Reitter, 1881
- Attagenus fulvipes Dahl, 1823
- Attagenus gilanicus Zhantiev, 2007
- Attagenus globosus Háva, 2003
- Attagenus gobicola Frivaldszky, 1892
- Attagenus grandjeani Pic, 1942
- Attagenus grisescens Pic, 1937
- Attagenus haladai Háva, 2006
- Attagenus hargreavesi Pic, 1935
- Attagenus havai Kadej, 2006
- Attagenus heinigi Herrmann & Háva, 2007
- Attagenus heydeni Reitter, 1881
- Attagenus hirtulus Rosenhauer, 1856
- Attagenus hirtus Sturm, 1826
- Attagenus hoffeinsorum Háva, Prokop & Herrmann, 2006
- Attagenus holmi Kalík & Háva, 2005
- Attagenus hottentotus Guérin -Méneville, 1844
- Attagenus inapicalis Pic, 1951
- Attagenus incertus Mulsant & Rey, 1868
- Attagenus incognitus Háva, 2003
- Attagenus indicus Kalík, 1954
- Attagenus insidiosus Halstead, 1981
- Attagenus insignatus Pic, 1942
- Attagenus ionicus Zhantiev, 2005
- Attagenus irroratus Blackburn, 1903
- Attagenus jacobsoni Zhantiev, 1963
- Attagenus jelineki Háva, 2004
- Attagenus jucundus Péringuey, 1885
- Attagenus karnali Háva, 2001
- Attagenus kephallenicus Háva & Kalík, 2006
- Attagenus korotyaevi Zhantiev, 2005
- Attagenus kratochvili Kalík, 1955
- Attagenus lategriseus Kalík, 1955
- Attagenus latepubescens Pic, 1952
- Attagenus leopardinus Reitter, 1881
- Attagenus lepidus Háva & Kovarík, 2004
- Attagenus leprieuri Reitter, 1887
- Attagenus lineatus Pic, 1894
- Attagenus lobatus Rosenhauer, 1856
- Attagenus longipennis Pic, 1904
- Attagenus luteithorax Pic, 1931
- Attagenus luteofasciatus Pic, 1937
- Attagenus lynx Mulsant & Rey, 1868
- Attagenus maculatus Kalík, 2006
- Attagenus madecassus Pic, 1916
- Attagenus madoni Pic, 1942
- Attagenus maritimus Gené, 1839
- Attagenus mongolicus Zhantiev, 1973
- Attagenus multifasciatus Wollaston, 1863
- Attagenus nepalensis Háva, 2001
- Attagenus nigripennis Arrow, 1915
- Attagenus nigroapicalis Pic, 1931
- Attagenus nigroluteus Kalík, 1955
- Attagenus obtusus Gyllenhal in Schönherr, 1808
- Attagenus orientalis Reitter in Schneider & Leder, 1878
- Attagenus pallidus Zhantiev, 2005
- Attagenus pardus Arrow, 1915
- Attagenus pellio Linnaeus, 1758
- Attagenus persicus Reitter, 1881
- Attagenus pictus Ballion, 1871
- Attagenus placitus Normand, 1949
- Attagenus postfasciatus Pic, 1951
- Attagenus posticalis Fairmaire, 1879
- Attagenus prescutellaris Pic, 1927
- Attagenus pseudomolitor Zhantiev, 1963
- Attagenus pubescens Pic, 1894
- Attagenus pustulatus Thunberg, 1815
- Attagenus quadrimaculatus Kraatz, 1858
- Attagenus quadrinotatus Pic, 1938
- Attagenus quadritinctus Reitter, 1889
- Attagenus reitteri Mroczkowski, 1968
- Attagenus rhodesianus Pic, 1927
- Attagenus robustior Pic, 1951
- Attagenus robustus Pic, 1899
- Attagenus roeri Kalík
- Attagenus rossii Ganglbauer, 1904
- Attagenus ruficollis Christofori & Jan, 1832
- Attagenus ruficolor Pic, 1918
- Attagenus rufimembris Pic, 1927
- Attagenus rufipennis LeConte, 1859
- Attagenus rufipes Sturm, 1843
- Attagenus rufiventris Pic, 1927
- Attagenus rufomaculatus Pic, 1907
- Attagenus scalaris (Pic, 1894)
- Attagenus schaefferi Herbst, 1792
- Attagenus seminiger Fairmaire, 1863
- Attagenus seniculus Solsky, 1876
- Attagenus sericeus Guérin-Méneville, 1844
- Attagenus sexnotatus Pic, 1927
- Attagenus sieversi Reitter, 1896
- Attagenus silvaticus Zhantiev, 1976
- Attagenus similaris Mulsant & Rey, 1868
- Attagenus simonis Reitter, 1881
- Attagenus simplex Reitter, 1881
- Attagenus sinensis Pic, 1927
- Attagenus smirnovi Zhantiev, 1973
- Attagenus somalicus Háva, 2003
- Attagenus sopitus Scudder, 1900
- Attagenus sparsutus Reitter, 1881
- Attagenus stachi Mroczkowski, 1958
- Attagenus steinbergi Zhantiev, 1963
- Attagenus suspiciosus Solsky, 1876
- Attagenus tessellatus Reitter, 1887
- Attagenus thunbergi Mroczkowski, 1968
- Attagenus tigrinus Fabricius, 1792
- Attagenus tomentosus Sturm, 1843
- Attagenus trifasciatus Fabricius, 1787
- Attagenus turcomanus Zhantiev, 1963
- Attagenus undulatus Motschulsky, 1858
- Attagenus unicolor (Brahm, 1790) – black carpet beetle
- Attagenus unifasciatus Sturm, 1843
- Attagenus uniformis Fairmaire in Fairmaire & Coquerel, 1860
- Attagenus vagepictus Fairmaire, 1889
- Attagenus vestitus Klug, 1855
- Attagenus vestitus Sturm, 1843
- Attagenus wollastoni Mroczkowski, 1964
- Attagenus woodroffei Halstead & Green, 1979
- Attagenus zavattarii Pic, 1952
