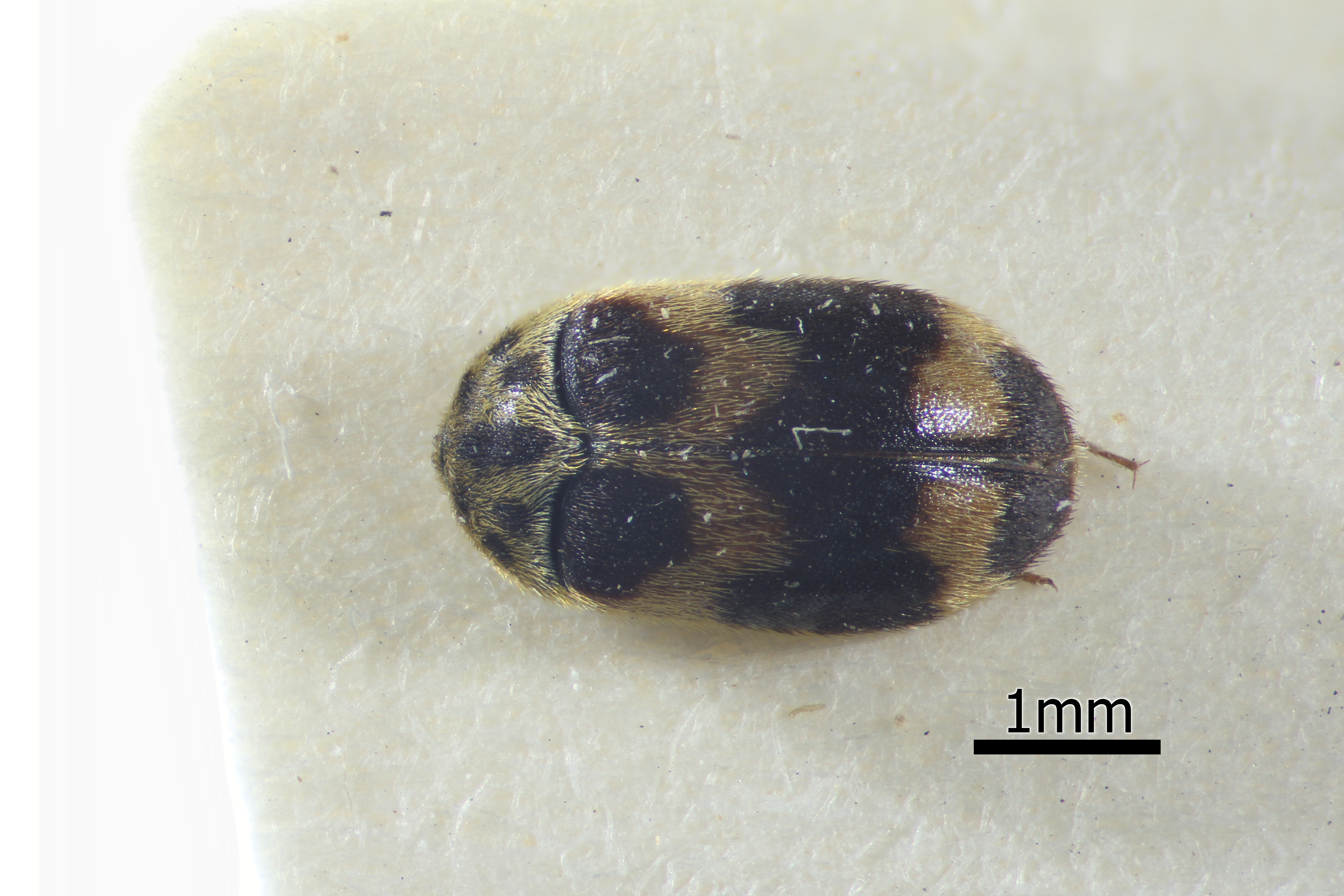

Scientific classification
- Kingdom: Animalia
- Phylum: Arthropoda
- Clade: Pancrustacea
- Class: Insecta
- Order: Coleoptera
- Suborder: Polyphaga
- Family: Dermestidae
- Genus: Attagenus
- Species: A. pictus

Binomial name
- Attagenus pictus Ballion, 1871

= Attagenus pictus =

Species of beetle

Attagenus pictus is a species of carpet beetle in the subfamily Attageninae, family Dermestidae. It is found in regions of Asia: Afghanistan, Northern Iran, Russia, Central Asia and Israel.
