= Conservation and restoration of flags and banners =

Process of conserving and restoring flags and banners

Textile Conservator working on wool flag

The conservation and restoration of flags and banners is the process by which conservators work to preserve and restore flags and banners from future deterioration and damage. As a part of Conservation of Textiles, flag and banner conservation require the care of a skilled and well trained textile conservator, specifically trained in historical materials.

== Material identification ==
Historical flags are often made of silk, cotton, linen, or thin wool bunting. These materials were used in the making of flags, primarily in the U.S. until the mid 20th century. Forensic examination of flags, to the level of examining the fibers of the fabrics themselves, and the threads used to sew the flags, helps identify the period of the materials used and usually is a good indicator of the period of a flag (though not necessarily, in the case of a forgery). These materials can be very fragile and require advanced conservation techniques. Conservators are experts in stabilization and preservation of historic fabrics, flags may be in a variety of conditions from good condition to tattered fragments. Silk and wool are protein fibers whereas cotton and linen are vegetable fibers. The process by which they deteriorate will vary greatly and needs to be carefully addressed during conservation and preservation. Nowadays many flags are made of a synthetic blend or nylon materials, which have their own unique requirements for preservation and care.

== Common causes of damage ==
Light damage to silk textile banner

Flag condition often relates to their usage during the war, so some of the most historically significant examples show the greatest damage. However, flags were not limited to damage from war, such as bullet holes or blood stains – which have specific treatments themselves – but also damage from natural elements such as wind, light exposure, temperature, humidity and pest infestation.

- Wind damage: The mechanical action of wind forces and exposure to environmental effects can cause damage to the filament and is characterized by splitting. Visual characteristics of wind damage include fraying and even shredding in high winds.
- Light exposure: Too much light speeds deterioration of textiles. Historic textiles, such as flags and banners should be protected from excessive light levels, and especially from sunlight and fluorescent light, which contain high amounts of ultraviolet radiation – which is the most harmful form of light. Signs of Light damage can include a brittleness of the material, overall color change of the fabric or yellowing/ browning of the textile.
- Temperature and humidity fluctuations: Both mechanisms of decay for objects can be attributed to either too low or too high of a temperature, too high of humidity, or too much fluctuation between temperatures or humidity levels.
- Pests: There are many types of pests, from insects to small mammals such as rodents that can infest an organic collection of all types. In particular, these pests can colonize textiles and cause irreparable damage. Other examples of the types of pests that can afflict historical flags and banners include cloth moths and carpet beetles. It is important to be vigilant of possible signs of infestation and to take preemptive measures to ensure infestation and damage does not occur. Professionals charged with the care and preservation of collections work to develop and enforce Integrated Pest Management plans (IPM) to ensure proper steps are taken to protect historic items such as flags and banners.

== Common treatments and handling ==
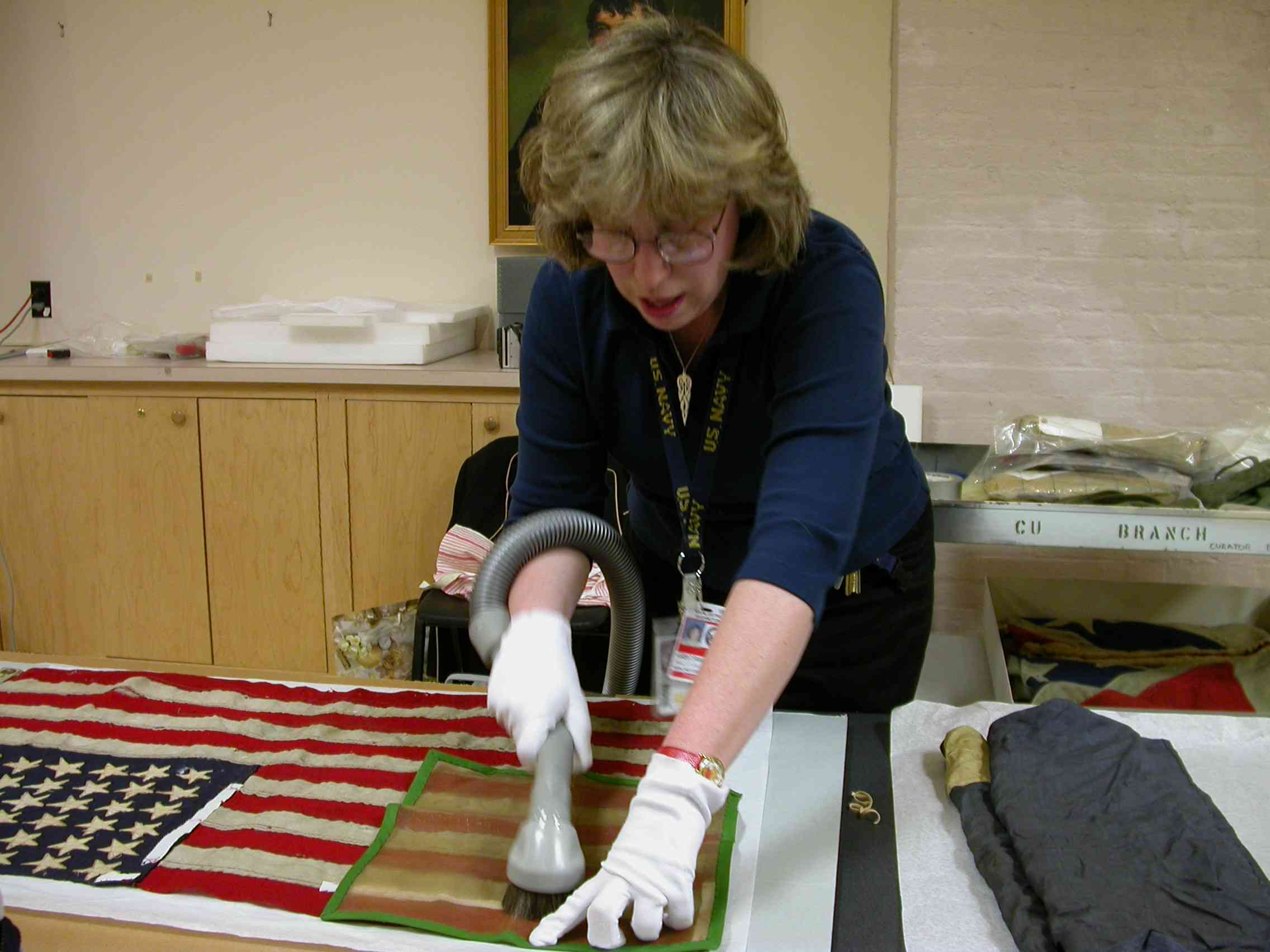
Vacuuming a flag using protective netting

- Cleaning – While many people have experience cleaning everyday textiles, cleaning historical textiles is different. Conservators approach cleaning historic textiles like flags and banner very carefully as each cleaning process can create a little damage. They must weigh the pros and cons of each method carefully before proceeding. Damage such as dyes bleeding, seams shrinking or finishes being lost can occur in the cleaning process.
- Vacuuming – also referred to as surface cleaning. This method is employed by conservators when trying to remove surface dirt. Carefully vacuuming the textile on a low suction, conservators will sometimes use a screen to prevent individual fibers from getting sucked up and lost in the vacuum. This method is considered least invasive and often very successful.
- Wet cleaning – or washing is a more invasive cleaning method, and one that conservators may be hesitant to use without proper review of the textile. Wet cleaning, or washing is an irreversible process, and can cause significant damage. In particular, commercial detergents and other chemicals can increase the rate of deterioration.
- Pest control-prevention is better than cure. In order to develop and implement an Integrated pest management (IPM) strategy it is important understand and recognize some of the key components of successful pest control.
1. Avoid pests – Keep the area clean a clear of clutter and inspect often.
2. Prevent pest colonization – follow routine pest management.

If pest infestation occurs it is important to act fast by following the IPM plan and consulting a trusted pest control professional. If individual pieces are attacked it is important to isolate them immediately in a plastic bag or sealed between to sheets of plastic and tape and then proceed with the IPM.

1. Recognize pests – what kind of infestation do you have?
2. Assess the pest problem – how pervasive is the problem?
3. Solve the pest problem – follow the IPM and consult a pest control professional
4. Review IMP procedure

== Storage ==
It is important to consider proper textile storage in the design plan of one's storage facility. This room should have limited access, in the interior of the building, with no exposure to outside light, temperature controlled, and properly installed monitoring equipment. Like other organic materials, textiles can deteriorate very quickly under fluctuating temperatures and humidity levels. Flags and banner are no exception to this so proper storage is critical in preservation.

- Flat storage – Flat storage mats are constructed of corrugated cardboard with a window opening that should be slightly large than the textile object. Textiles should be wrapped in neutral pH tissue. This flat mats can then be stored in flat acid free boxes.
- Rolled storage – Flat textiles that are in good condition and in good strength can be rolled up and stored in tubes. The length of the textile tube is determined by the width of the textile. Textiles should be inter-leafed by neutral pH tissue paper and the textile secured in the tube. Textile tubes should then be stored in flat boxes made of acid free corrugated cardboard.
- Mounted storage – historic flags and banners are also mounted for display and storage. It is important to keep in mind the condition of the flag prior to placing it in mounted storage.
