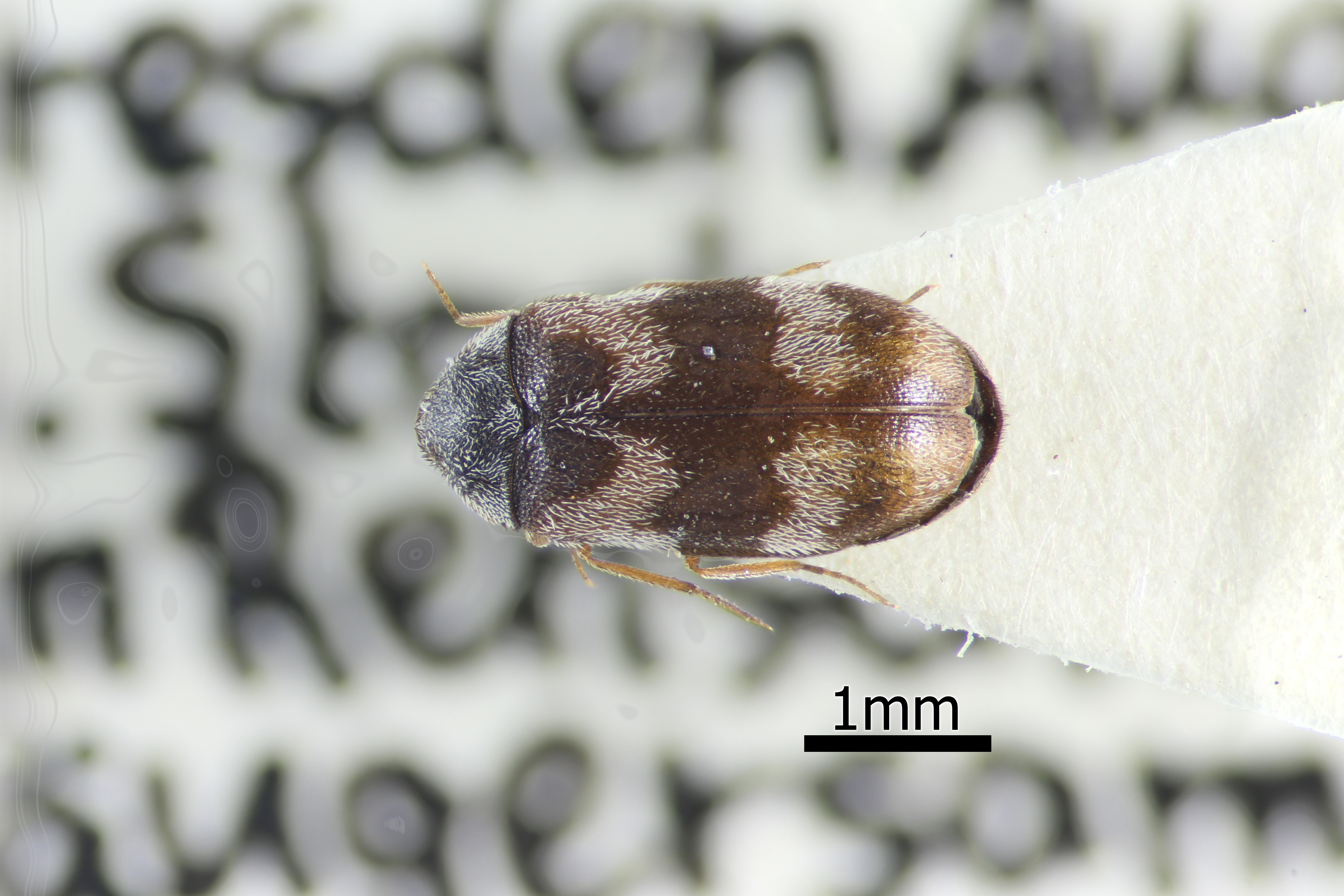

Scientific classification
- Kingdom: Animalia
- Phylum: Arthropoda
- Clade: Pancrustacea
- Class: Insecta
- Order: Coleoptera
- Suborder: Polyphaga
- Family: Dermestidae
- Genus: Trogoderma
- Species: T. angustum

Binomial name
- Trogoderma angustum (Solier, 1849)

= Trogoderma angustum =

Species of beetle

Trogoderma angustum is a species of beetle in the family Dermestidae native to South America (Argentina, Chile and Peru). It has been introduced to several regions including Europe, Asia (India, Pakistan, Thailand, Yemen), United States, New Zealand, and possibly Congo.

== Taxonomy ==
Genetic research in Zhou et al. (2022) revealed that the species is closely related to a widespread parthenogenetic species, Reesa vespulae, and other species originating from South America (including the genus Sodaliotoma). All of these species are considered by some authors to belong to the genus Eurhopalus, many of which were previously considered to be Trogoderma.

By definition of Zhou et al. (2022), the species is Eurhopalus angustus, however, the change is not yet accepted by some researchers.
