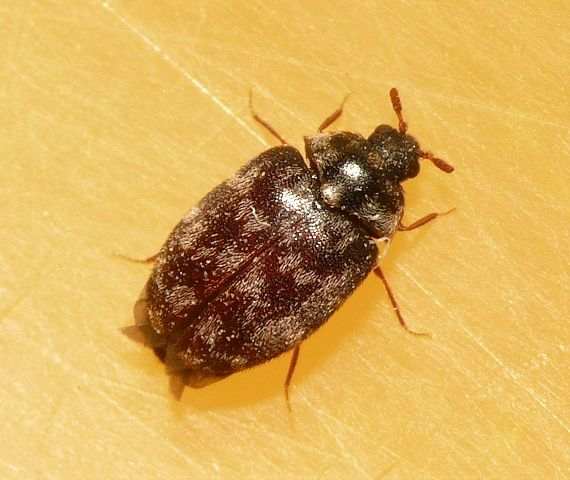
- Anthrenocerus australis

Scientific classification
- Kingdom: Animalia
- Phylum: Arthropoda
- Class: Insecta
- Order: Coleoptera
- Suborder: Polyphaga
- Family: Dermestidae
- Subtribe: Anthrenocerina
- Genus: Anthrenocerus; Arrow, 1915

= Anthrenocerus =

Genus of beetles

Anthrenocerus is a genus of beetles in the family Dermestidae, the skin beetles.

Species include:

- Anthrenocerus armstrongi Roach, 2000
- Anthrenocerus arrowi Armstrong, 1949
- Anthrenocerus australis (Hope, 1843)
- Anthrenocerus bicolor Arrow, 1915
- Anthrenocerus blackburni Armstrong, 1943
- Anthrenocerus brindabella Roach, 2000
- Anthrenocerus chalceous Armstrong, 1943
- Anthrenocerus concolorous Armstrong, 1943
- Anthrenocerus condensus Armstrong, 1943
- Anthrenocerus confertus Reitter, 1881
- Anthrenocerus convexus Armstrong, 1943
- Anthrenocerus corrugatus Roach, 2000
- Anthrenocerus decoris Roach, 2000
- Anthrenocerus hirsutus Roach, 2000
- Anthrenocerus intricatus Roach, 2000
- Anthrenocerus maculosus Armstrong, 1943
- Anthrenocerus micus Roach, 2000
- Anthrenocerus nebulosus Roach, 2000
- Anthrenocerus occidentalis Roach, 2000
- Anthrenocerus pilatus Roach, 2000
- Anthrenocerus pinto Roach, 2000
- Anthrenocerus pulchellus Arrow, 1915
- Anthrenocerus quadrifasciatus Blackburn, 1903
- Anthrenocerus schwarzeneggeri Roach, 2000
- Anthrenocerus signatus Armstrong, 1943
- Anthrenocerus stellatus Roach, 2000
- Anthrenocerus stigmacrophilus Armstrong, 1949
- Anthrenocerus terzonatus Blackburn, 1903
- Anthrenocerus tessellatus Roach, 2000
- Anthrenocerus trimaculatus Armstrong, 1943
- Anthrenocerus variabilis Reitter, 1881
