= Conservation and restoration of clocks =

Preservation of tangible objects

The conservation and restoration of clocks refers to the care given to the physical and functional aspects of time measuring devices featuring "moving hands on a dial face" exclusive of watches. Care for clocks constitutes regulating the external environment, cleaning, winding, lubrication, pest-management, and repairing or replacing mechanical and aesthetic components to preserve or achieve the desired state as specified by the owner. Clocks are typically composed of multiple types of materials such as wood, metal, paint, plastic, etc., which have unique behaviors and environmental interactions, making treatment options complex. The materials used and the complexity of clockwork warrant having a Horological Conservator complete the work.

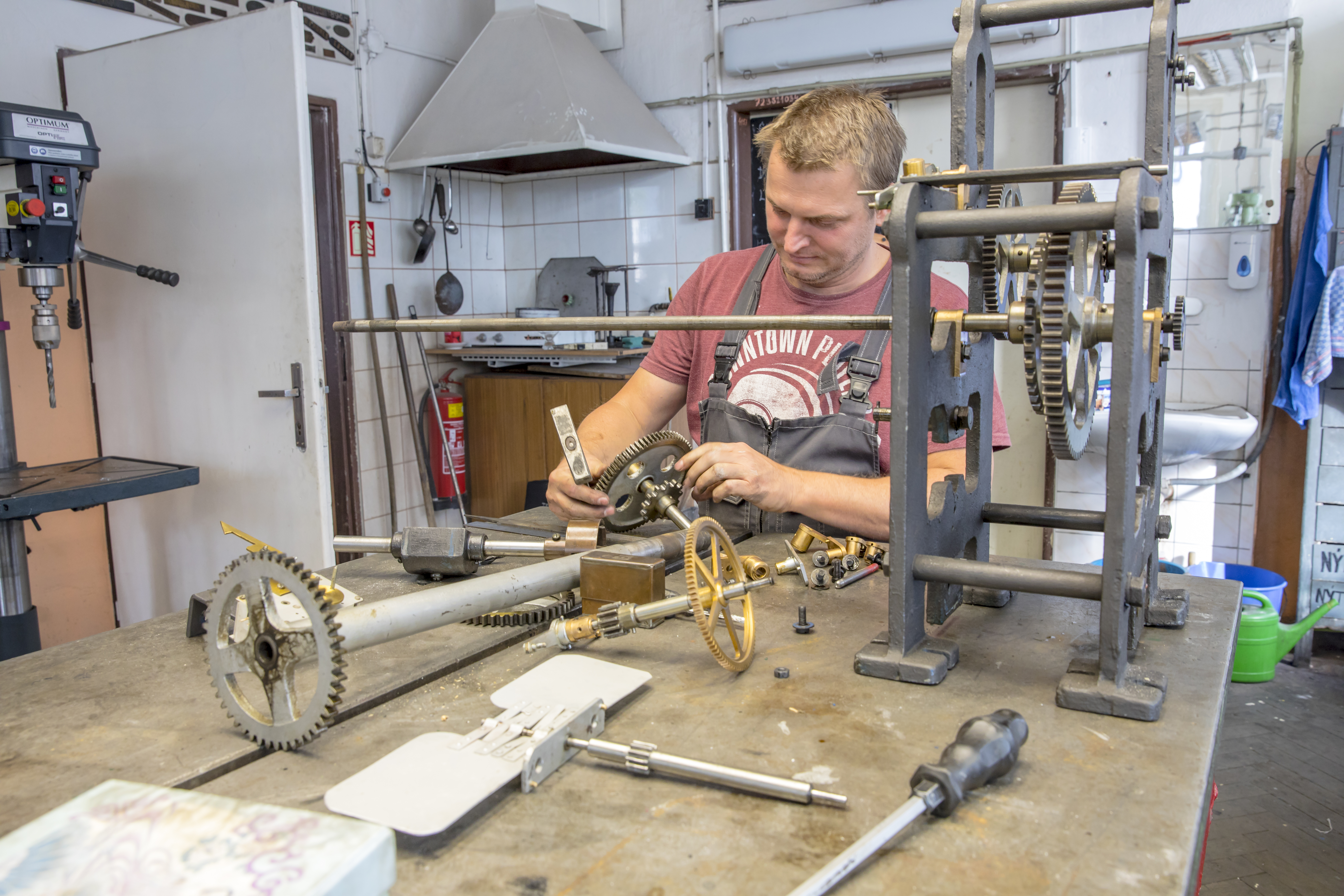
Conservation of the Old Town Hall clock in Prague, Czechoslovakia

== Conservation and restoration ==
Interventive actions can be taken by trained conservators when clock issues arise, with treatment varying depending on the type of clock and situation.

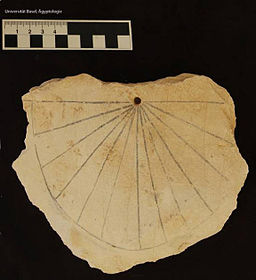
World's oldest Sundial, from Egypt's Valley of the Kings (c. 1500 BC). University of Basel - Valley of the Kings, Egypt

=== Horological conservation history ===
The history of clock conservation dates back to ancient times. Horology, the study of the measurement of time, dates to 1450 BC, "when the Ancient Egyptians first observed the earth's natural circadian rhythms (Meadows, C., (n.d.)." Some examples of instruments used to measure time include: clocks, watches, sundials, hourglasses, time recorders, and atomic clocks. Horological Conservation is the science and art of preserving timepieces to connect humanity with the history and heritage of timepieces.

=== Conservators ===
A conservator who specializes in clock care will have the qualifications and training to properly treat a clock with the wherewithal to "[...] not totally compromise the historical worth of the object [...]." Conservators rely on a system of examination, documentation, and research prior to treatment so that proper treatment is received, as "Sometimes the only way one can understand the detailed history, quirks, and specific eccentricities common to a particular timepiece is by studying it to glean as much information from it as possible [...]." Aside from pinpointing clock issues and providing care to a clock in need, conservators are also able to impart knowledge about procedures like clock winding to ill-informed clock owners so that future clock damage due to human error may be avoided.

Conservators are encouraged to use restraint when restoring objects due to ethical concerns and only make necessary repairs rather than altering the appearance of objects such as clocks for aesthetic preferences. One exception to this dilemma is conservation done to correct previous treatments, which scholarship and investigation have proven to be dishonest or poorly-conceived efforts that took an object further away from its original form.

== Preventive conservation ==
Preventive conservation involves the proper handling, creating and maintaining suitable storage and display environments, and regular maintenance to prevent issues from arising and impacting a clock's sustainability. Such controls can extend the life of a clock.

=== Correct handling ===
Handling is a potentially a major source of damage to any heritage item. Any handling of an object should be planned in advance and requires some precautions. Certain measures taken by a clock handler can prevent opportunities for damage.

Pendulum removed from clockwork

Work areas should be clean and arranged to support the safety of the clock: uncluttered, free of any potential for the clock to be bumped, jostled, or moved unnecessarily, and secure from theft.

Wearing "[...] cotton or Nitrile gloves when handling the metal portions of the clock" can limit opportunities for transfer of contaminants from hands to clock surfaces.

Loose items such as jewelry and loose clothing like scarves or bulky jackets worn by a handler have the potential to come into contact with, and cause damage to, a clock. Removal of these items prior to clock handling can lower the risk of damage.

Pendulum damage during clock movement can be prevented by either removing the pendulum or fixing it within the interior of the clock via a latch or padding prior to clock movement. This can also prevent damage to other interior components.

When moving or handling a "weight-driven clocks, it is advisable to wait until the clock has wound down before it is relocated. Once it has stopped running, carefully remove the weights and pendulum".

A clock "[...] should always be grasped at its most sturdy area" and moved from one location to the next on its back.

The correlation of the size of a clock with the number of people moving it can ensure the safety of the clock. A small, mantle clock for example may only require one mover, while a tall clock can necessitate a number of movers to safely carry it to another location.

=== Proper storage and display ===
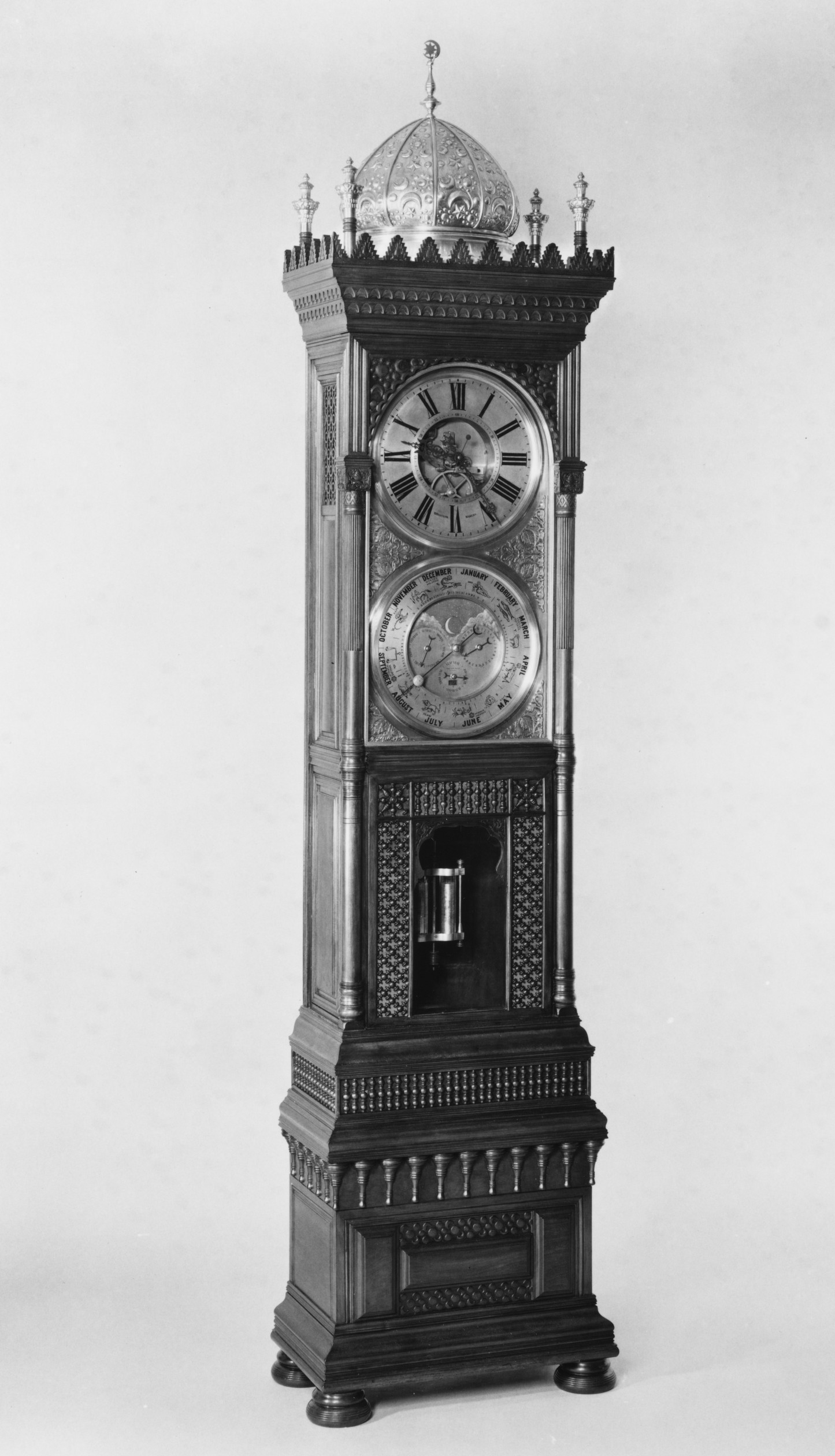
19th c. Tiffany Longcase Clock photo donated by the Met 192934

Proper storage and display mechanisms can work to ensure a clock's safety. For safety and mechanical reasons, conservators securely fix long case clocks and wall clocks to a wall to avoid accidents and to ensure the clocks area to run properly. The use of a solid, sturdy surface when storing or displaying a clock can prevent it from falling on a hard surface. A wall clock for example requires a secure attachment "[...] to a wall if accidents are to be avoided and clocks are to run properly." Clock cases, which come in many different materials, require special consideration and treatment in their own right. Conservators further advise not exposing a clock to a heat source of any kind, including strong sunlight or a mantel over a working fire, as this can cause damage to the clock cases and movements.

Motion sensitive lighting and use of non-direct light sources can limit the amount of light and heat withstood by a clock, both of which are sources of clock damage. A clean clock environment can eliminate opportunities for dangerous contaminants to come into contact with a clock. An HVAC system can add an extra level of security by removing such contaminants from the air.

==== Correct humidity and temperature levels ====
The humidity and temperature of the environment in which a clock is being displayed or stored can adversely affect the clock's condition. Damage may be avoided by maintaining certain levels of humidity and temperature within the clock environment, dependent on the materials from which the clock is constructed.

a. Wood clocks
The ideal humidity and temperature ranges for clocks whose cases are made from wood vary depending on the season. In the summer, an environment with a temperature of 70 to 75 degrees Fahrenheit and 40% to 60% relative humidity is suitable. During the winter, an environment with a temperature of 70 degrees Fahrenheit and 35% to 50% relative humidity is prime.

b. Metal clocks
Clocks whose cases are made from metal function well in an environment with a temperature of 68 degrees Fahrenheit and a relative humidity of 30%.

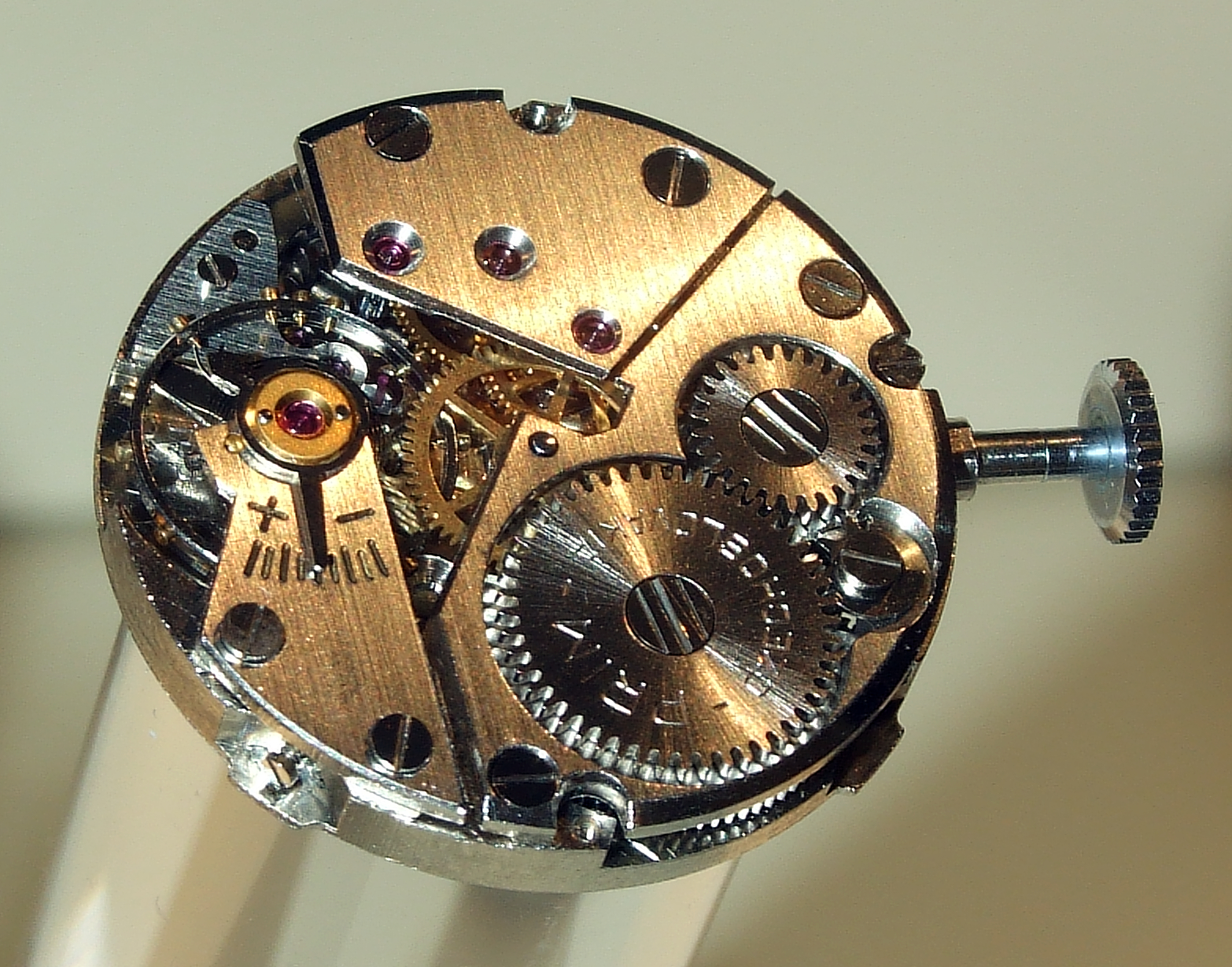
The mechanics inside a timepiece

==== Running clocks vs. static display ====
Clocks can be simple display objects if they are not required to run. This reduces the physical force on the clock. Whereas "running any functional object will result in wear and handling, which contributes to the degradation of the parts. Replacing the inner workings of a clock still requires handling, which could potentially damage the clock. Conserving a non-functional clock is much less invasive (cheaper!) and preventive protection against corrosion and environmental hazards is the main concern for its stabilization and care.[viii] Perhaps the least invasive solution to highlight a functional clock would be to purchase a replica clock and safely store the original". Running clocks also require winding, which adds to the wear-and-tear of the gears and leads to more handling of the object.

=== Regular clock maintenance ===
Regular maintenance of a clock can ensure its long-term preservation. Conservation experts advise clocks need to be serviced regularly. A clock is a complex mechanical contraption made of a variety of materials and with many small moving parts. Even under perfect conditions lubricants deteriorate. Clocks should be examined and re-lubricated every three years. After five years, and certainly no longer than eight years, the whole movement is advised to be dismantled and 'cleaned' if excessive wear and expensive attention is to be avoided

Visual inspection can determine whether a clock should be cleaned and/or lubricated, whether any signs of infestation and/or damage exist, and whether a clock should be wound and/or set to the correct time.

Regular maintenance also applies to the environment surrounding the clock to ensure that the correct storage conditions are present.

==== Cleaning, polishing, and lubrication ====
Regular clock surface dusting can negate opportunities for corrosion or abrasion as a result of dust buildup. It should be stated that such surface cleaning can also result in a loss of information about a clock's history, as "[...] various "dirt" or "salt" deposits can provide precious clues to an objects past [...]." Loss of clock function due to clockwork wear can be avoided through regular clockwork cleaning, polishing, and lubrication performed by a trained professional. In performing such maintenance, a professional will disassemble clockwork so that it can be thoroughly examined "[...] for worn or broken parts, fatigued springs and accumulations of dirt or oil."

Cleaning clocks consist of multiple steps, which may or may not all be done as part of a treatment plan: washing, ultrasonics, rinsing, drying, polishing, refinishing, chalk brushing, and pegging out. At this point, should cleaning be the only treatment employed, the pieces could be reassembled with proper lubrication; however, depending on the type of clock, the pieces could also be primed for further treatments to the various parts such as mechanisms, frames, wheelwork, pivots, mainsprings, screws and screw threads, escapements, balance springs, pendulums, etc.

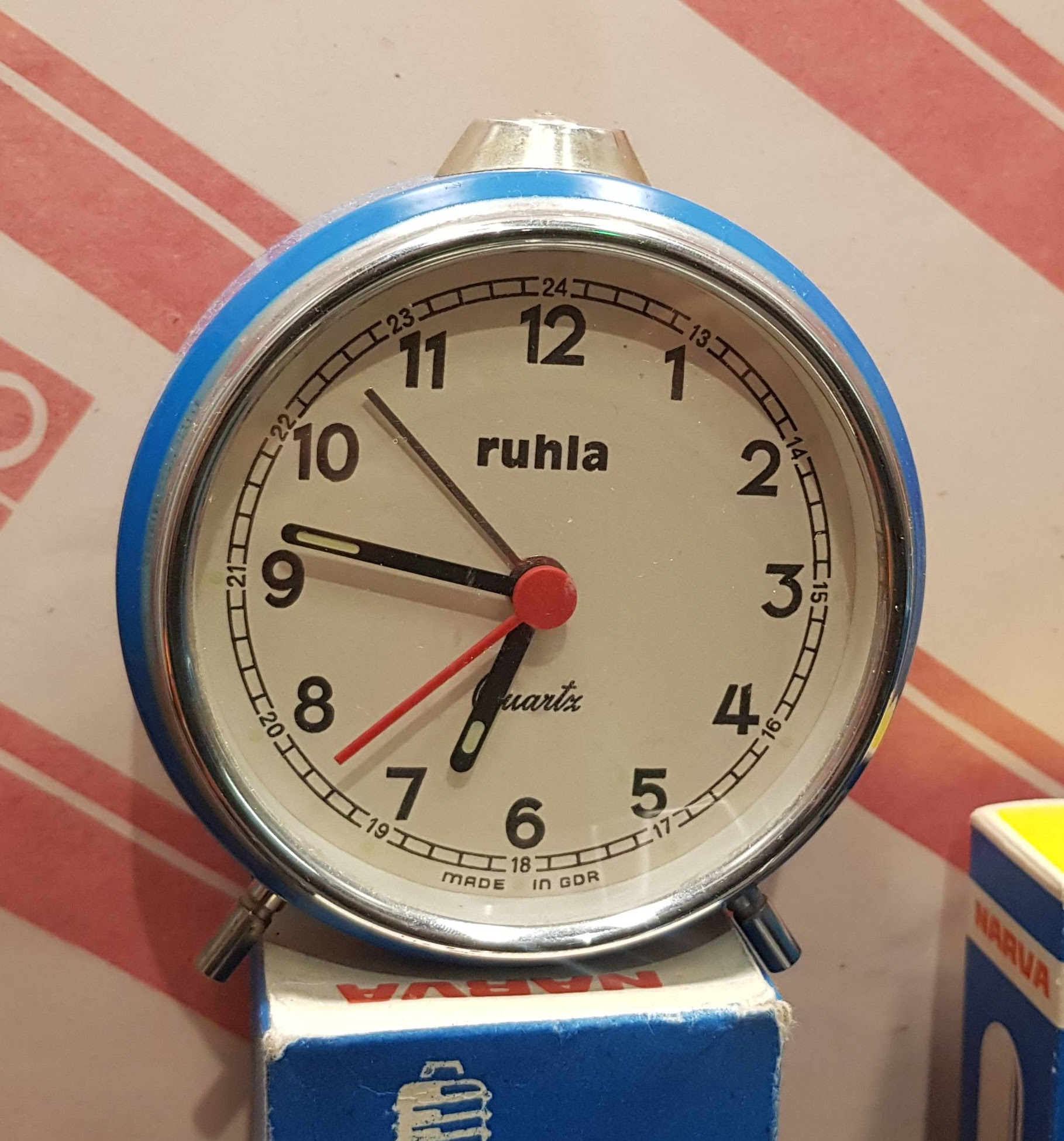
Ruhla alarm clock

==== Winding and setting ====
In order to function as time keepers, and to prevent damage to clockwork, clocks must be regularly wound. An established winding schedule eliminates the threat of over-winding."Traditionally, the job of winding the clocks was given to an horologist or a trained individual. Winding had to be done at certain times of the day; ideally when the temperature was just right and the room vacant. Each clock had its own unique keys, doors, and intricacies within the mechanisms." Regular winding can also ensure that clockwork is still functioning. In setting the correct time, the minute hand is turned clockwise to the desired time.

When hand setting a clock, manually moving the hour or seconds hand rather than the minute hand to set the time can be damaging, as can be counterclockwise hand turning. Moving the minute hand ahead on a clock by several hours when setting the time can also lead to clockwork damage. For this reason, "Rather than turning the hands forward through several hours it is better to stop the clock and re-start it when the time matches that on the dial."

== Agents of deterioration ==
Damage can occur via a variety of mechanisms, either rooted in human error or naturally caused. Agents of Deterioration (AOD) are the ten primary categories of threats to heritage objects. These agents of deterioration can occur while an object is in storage, on display, undergoing conservation, or during handling or transportation of the object.

=== Physical force ===
Physical force is any impact, shock, vibration, pressure or abrasion that causes damage to an object. Physical force damage commonly occurs when handling the object. Any excessive physical force will break, damage, splinter the clock frame or easily shatter the glass of the object.

Clocks are complex functional objects; many have moveable working parts. Any excessive physical force can damage the mechanics inside the clock which are critical to its operation. Most commonly, these delicate inner-workings are metal, but clocks can be made of any number of materials, from wood to precious metals like silver and gold. They can have enamel inlays or delicate carvings and be a variety of sizes from small clocks to large grandfather clocks or clock towers. When a clock is in the custody of a professional institution such as a museum, proper barriers and monitored security of the clocks greatly reduce this risk. Some common sources of physical force damage to clocks are:

a. Mishandling
The failure of a handler to remove loose items like jewelry or clothing items like scarves from their person can result in these items striking a clock's surface. A handler who uses his or her bare hands to touch or transport a clock exposes the clock to contaminants, leaving "unsightly and potentially damaging marks." A handler who chooses to drag rather than lift a large clock "[...] can place stress on the legs and feet of the clock." Lifting a clock via false handles or non-sturdy components may cause these parts to snap off of the clock, potentially leading to the clock falling and smashing on a surface.

b. Over-winding or improper hand setting
Improper clock winding and hand setting procedures can cause serious damage to clockwork components. The use of an inappropriate key to wind a clock is one such improper procedure. The manner in which a clock is wound is also important, as "[...] considerable and potentially expensive damage can be caused by not winding gently and steadily", as well as by turning the key too many times.

c. Unstable storage or display
Unsuitable storage and display environments pose great risks to a clock's condition. Placement of a clock on an unstable surface or non-secure mounting on a wall can cause a clock to fall when external vibrations or human-caused accidents occur.

=== Theft and vandalism ===
Some clocks are constructed out of precious materials that are a source of temptation for theft. They can be small enough to easily steal. While a minimal concern for most wood clocks, as they are rarely stolen in a burglary, a valuable historic clock may be more susceptible to theft.

With regard to vandalism, any public place runs a risk for any object being vandalized. If a clock is on display in a location that does not have conventional display cases for example, large clocks could be vandalize. In the case of wood clocks, slashing the wood, smashing the glass, or graffiti would be the most common problems for a public institution. High security, cameras, and inspections after crowds leave, especially for highly coveted antique clocks, are usually required in professional institutions.

=== Disassociation ===
The disassociation agent of deterioration refers to the separation or loss of individual parts of an object. This is possible in clocks, especially during cleaning or maintenance when the clock has to be disassembled. "Clocks can consist of up to five hundred individual components", so preventive conservation can be complex for these objects. Any one of those components can be lost or misplaced, resulting in damage to the object as a whole. If the part is critical, the clock may no longer run.

=== Incorrect relative humidity ===
The variety of materials used in clocks, can be sensitive to fluctuations in humidity. "A stable and appropriate relative humidity and temperature should be maintained to prevent parts from rusting, corrosion, darkening of silvers, and lubricants from drying out". Changes in relative humidity can cause wooded clocks to expand or contract. Fluctuating humidity leads to swelling and shrinking that can "loosen the joints of organic components". When changes in humidity causes the wooden parts of the clock to expand and contact, the inorganic components of a clock remain fixed, resulting in strain within the object. This is particularly a problem if the wood becomes warped and creates a pressure point against the inorganic interior workings.

Humidity that is too damp can deform organic materials or corrode metals found in clocks. High humidity can cause warping, rotting, and mold or fungus growth in a wood clock, and can corrode the metal components of a clock. Glass facings can also trap moisture within the machine creating a prime environment for mold or rust, another agent of deterioration known as pollutants, to grow and build up internally.

=== Incorrect temperature ===
The temperature of a given environment can play a direct role in clock deterioration. "[...] extremes in temperature and humidity" can cause drastic changes in the materials from which a clock is made, inevitably leading to damage. Placement of a clock for example near "a heat source of any kind, including strong sunlight or a mantel over a working fire [...] can cause damage to cases and movements." In some instances, the heat from the fire contribute to faster deterioration in mantel clocks.

Clocks, regardless of the materials they are made of, are susceptible to damage from incorrect temperatures. Like light, temperature that is too high can cause weakening, discoloration, and or disintegration of organic materials.

With wood clocks, temperature is critical to conservation and preservation. Extreme heat and freezing temperature will significantly damage the wood's surface. Incorrect temperatures or uncontrolled climates of storage areas can cause rapid deterioration to wood clocks. Incorrect temperature causes the wood to expand or contract.

=== Pests ===
Depending on the materials the clock is made of, pests may be attracted to it. This is especially true for wooden clocks, since many pests feed on organic materials like wood. Many pests, rodents and insects burrow or feast on wood. Wood-boring insects may infest a clock if it is stored in an environment which supports insect activity and allows them access to the clock.

Even for clocks that are made entirely of metal, spiders can cause problems because "their webs attract dust and can clog a clock's movement".

Pests that are known to infest clocks are attracted to the organic materials from which a clock may be constructed:

- Carpet beetle- Attracted to protein-based adhesives sometimes used in clock construction, and as such "[...] are generally found at joinery and inside clock cases."
- Powderpost beetle- Lured by any wood materials from which a clock is constructed, they are known to drill holes into wood.

=== Light: infrared and ultraviolet ===
Over-exposure to light can impact clock materials in a number of ways; many of the materials used in clocks are prone to light damage, both ultraviolet and infrared.

Visible light damage can cause discoloration and deterioration. Exposure to infrared can increase the temperature of the wood, this can cause increased oxidation, which causing damage to the wood's surface and develop irregular markings.

Ultraviolet light can cause weakening, discoloration, and or disintegration of organic materials like wood. Exposure to direct sunlight (UV) over long periods of time will damage the wood by warping, fading, dry-rotting, and cause damage to the wood structure. Exposure to both UV and infrared light can alter, damage or ruin any stains or finish on a wood clock.

Light agents of deterioration can be associated with temperature agents of deterioration, depending on the nature of the light source. Heat from a light source can also cause the varnish or finish on a clock surface to melt, resulting in a sticky surface to which harmful contaminants can become attached. Too much light exposure can also result in changes to finish color, as well as cause finish deterioration "[...] resulting in a cracked, brittle and/or "alligatored" appearance."

=== Pollutants ===
Dust buildup on top of a clock case

Pollutants are any elements which can corrode, degrade, or alter the condition of an object. Chemicals, smoke, airborne particles, and gases are all pollutants that can damage a clock. The following are two such examples:

- Dust is one such contaminant which settles on a clock's surface. If not addressed, dust buildup can lead to abrasion and corrosion. Dust and other airborne abrasives can build up inside clocks and impeded and wear down their mechanisms "the abrasive particle will become imbedded into the bearing wall and act as a piece of "sandpaper [...]." Regular clockwork activities can also lead to wear, as lubricants are known to degrade over time. In the case of mantel clocks that have been displayed above fireplaces, these abrasives include soot.

- Oil is transferred to a clock surface when a clock is handled with bare hands. The presence of oil on a clock can cause damage, particularly corrosion when metal clock components are touched.

Other pollutants can cause oxidization and tarnishing in metal clocks. The cleaning agents used to remove pollutants can result in a chemical reaction with previously used lubricants or cleaning agents or with the materials of the clock. Excessive cleaning can "cause more issues like over-drying of bearings and stress corrosion cracking of brass that is exposed to ammonia solution". The mechanisms within clocks are highly sensitive to external matter like oils from fingertips or dust, so much so, that it can cause the machine to malfunction if it gets into the wrong area. For static displays, the functionality of a clock is not always necessary, but limiting the introduction of organic matter through mishandling will prevent unnecessary decay over the life of the clock. The wood used in many wood clocks are very porous, and easily absorb the elements around their environment and affect the integrity of the wood. Well-sealed and insulated rooms mitigate pollutant damage.

=== Fire ===
Like most heritage objects, clocks are highly vulnerable to fire. Not only are the fluctuations in temperature harmful, most clocks will be irreparably damaged if exposed to fire. Errant embers from a fireplace can be a potential threat to mantle clocks. Other threats may be any open flame, wood burning stove, heater, or pilot light.

Many clocks are small enough that evacuating them during an emergency could be possible. Large clocks that belong to buildings, like clock towers, may survive fire and could possibly be restored.

=== Water ===
Water damage is one of the greatest agents of deterioration for a wood clock; water warps, swells and rots the wood. The components of many clocks are extremely susceptible to water damage. Because of the complexity of these objects, they are very challenging to dry. It may be extremely difficult, depending upon the severity of the water damage, to repair or restore the clock to its correct condition. Salvaging warped or rotted wood can be challenging and the damaged material may need to be replaced entirely. Water damage also causes corrosion to the internal mechanisms of the clock.

== Specific types of clock damage ==
Damage can impact all components and materials from which a clock may be constructed.

=== Wood damage ===
Due to its porous nature, wood is significantly impacted through contact with water. When humidity is high, the excess water in the air is absorbed, resulting in wood expansion, while little to no water in the air when humidity is low can cause wood shrinkage. Such changes in character from the wood's original state can lead to damage. Types of low humidity-related wood damage include "[...] structural cracks, lifting veneer and inlays, gaps in joints and the embrittlement of adhesives."

=== Metal damage ===
Similar to wood, interaction with water can also prove detrimental to metal. When contaminants come into contact with metal, they either combine with any present moisture or attract moisture to the metal. This "[...] combination with moisture can produce corrosion."

=== Plastic damage ===
Modern clocks may feature plastic cases, dials, faces, and mechanisms in conjunction with more traditional materials, such as metal or wood. As plastic was created in the twentieth century, conservation treatments are still being researched by conservators. Since the term plastic covers a broad spectrum of materials from celluloid to technopolymers, there are various reactions to environmental factors and agents of deterioration, making clocks with plastic cases or component parts susceptible to unique stresses that are not wholly understood at this point. What is known is that different types of plastics can degrade quickly and unexpectedly because of the inherent vice of some polymers.

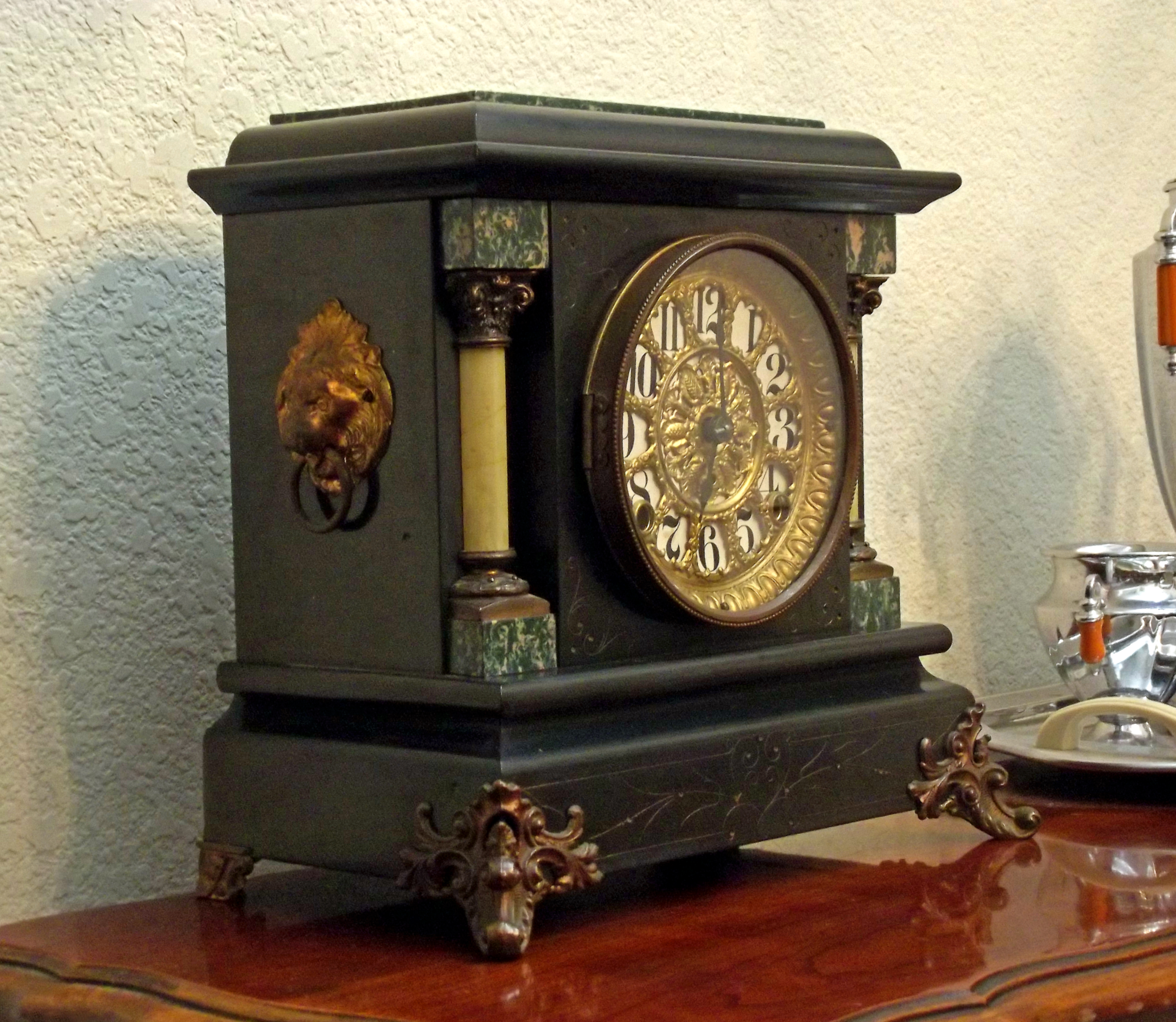
The "serpentine" and "stone" of the pillars on this Seth Thomas black mantel clock are made of celluloid glued to wood.

Exposure to improper lighting, humidity, water, or solvents may cause chemical deterioration in plastics resulting in reactions such as "a white powder 'blooming' on the surface of an object, discoloration, distortion of the object's shape and strong indicator smells of vinegar, or mothballs," crazing, cracks, acid deposits, and sticky surface textures.

It can be difficult to easily identify the chemical makeup of the plastic used to create an object, which can make interventive conservation challenging because the potential reactions to treatments are unknown. Therefore, preventive conservation tactics similar to those used for organic objects are the primary method of caring for objects made with plastic such as clocks.

=== Finish or paint damage ===
Finish damage can occur as a result of the use of cleaning products and/or polishes on a clock's surface. Rather than perform their intended duty to assist in the preservation of a clock, some products "can actually darken or become opaque with age, resulting in a dark, dull and often irreparable finish." Any words or images painted on a clock surface can become faded or even removed when these delicate pieces are touched and exposed to moisture from hands.

=== Interior or clockwork damage ===
Clockwork damage can be inflicted via over-winding, interaction with contaminants, ill-advised lubrication, and clock movement when a pendulum is not secured prior to the clock being moved. A free swinging pendulum can itself be damaged and can inflict damage onto other interior components during such clock movement.

=== Improper cleaning and polishing ===
Many cleaners and polishers contain properties that "[...] have been proven to age poorly." Resultantly, the use of such cleaners and polishers can prove detrimental. The use of ammonia based cleaning products for example on brass clock components can lead to an irreversible form of damage called Stress Corrosion Cracking. Depending on the type of metal on which it is used, a metallic brush employed to apply cleaning products not only can create the proper conditions for corrosion, but can "[...] remove any protective oxide layers even with careful use."

=== Improper lubrication ===
Attempts by non-professionals to lubricate or repair clockwork can lead to serious damage and loss of clock functionality. A lubricant applied without first cleaning and polishing clockwork to remove the previous lubricant and contaminants can result in wear rather than prevent it. The combination of the newly applied lubricant with the previous lubricant often results in "[...] an unwanted chemical reaction between the two lubricants [...]." A careless lubricant choice can result in the use of inappropriate or "Poor-quality oil" on clockwork, which "can become sticky leading to mechanical problems." The inexperience of a non-professional can also lead to "the use of too much oil, or oil in the wrong place" during attempts to lubricate clockwork. The application of too much of a lubricant can be damaging because it "[...] usually causes the lubrication to run out of the bearing and by capillary action will cause the bearing to go dry." Totally ignoring the lubrication needs of clockwork can be jeopardizing not only because of lubricant degradation, but because of the acidic nature of the organic lubricants often used in antique clocks.

== Examples ==
=== Anglesey Abbey Pagoda Clock ===
Horological conservators at West Dean College were responsible for the treatment of an 18th-century pagoda clock sent from the historic house Anglesey Abbey by the National Trust. In starting the project, examination of the clock revealed that "The automata and clock elements seem to be running, but struggling, and the music sounds as though it needs a few extra hands to help play its tune." The clock was then disassembled, and care was taken to document information about each of the over 600 components both textually and photographically, including measurements and where each component fits within the clock. "After examination, each component was cleaned and dried, wrapped in acid-free tissue, and stored with the catalogue number."
