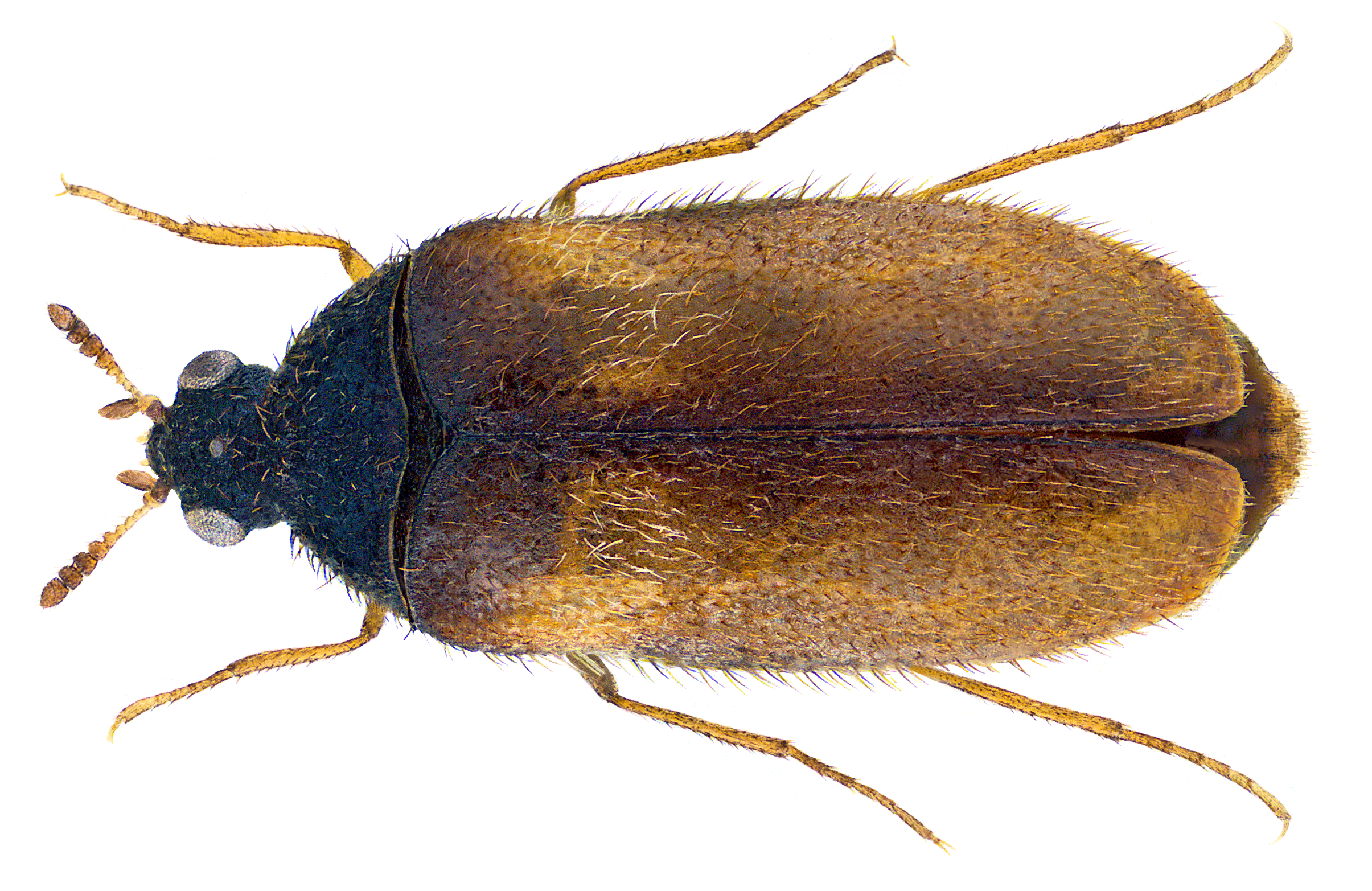

Scientific classification
- Domain: Eukaryota
- Kingdom: Animalia
- Phylum: Arthropoda
- Class: Insecta
- Order: Coleoptera
- Suborder: Polyphaga
- Family: Dermestidae
- Genus: Reesa
- Species: R. vespulae

Binomial name
- Reesa vespulae (Milliron, 1939)

= Reesa =

Genus of beetles

Reesa is a monotypic genus of beetles in the family Dermestidae, the skin beetles. The sole species is Reesa vespulae. This beetle is native to the Nearctic, but today it can be found nearly worldwide; it is easily introduced to new areas.

This beetle can be identified by two reddish bands on its elytra, black setae, and antennae tipped with clubs divided into four segments. Only female individuals have been observed; it is believed to be parthenogenetic.

This species, like several other dermestids, is a museum pest. It feeds on dried animal products such as museum specimens.

== Taxonomy ==
Genetic research in Zhou et al. (2022) revealed that the species is closely related to a widespread species, Trogoderma angustum and other species originating from South America (including the genus Sodaliotoma). All of these species are considered by some authors to belong to the genus Eurhopalus, many of which were previously considered to be Trogoderma.

Under the proposed classification of Zhou et al. (2022), the species is Eurhopalus vespulae, however the change is not yet accepted by some researchers.
