= Carpet beetle =

Carpet beetle may refer to any of several taxa of beetles:

- some genera of the Dermestidae, a beetle family, including:
  - genus Attagenus
    - black carpet beetle, Attagenus unicolor
    - brown carpet beetle, Attagenus smirnovi
    - Attagenus pellio
  - genus Anthrenus
    - varied carpet beetle, Anthrenus verbasci
    - Anthrenus scrophulariae, also known as the common carpet beetle
    - Anthrenus flavipes (A. flavipes), also known as the furniture carpet beetle
  - genus Trogoderma
    - Trogoderma variabile, also known as the warehouse beetle
