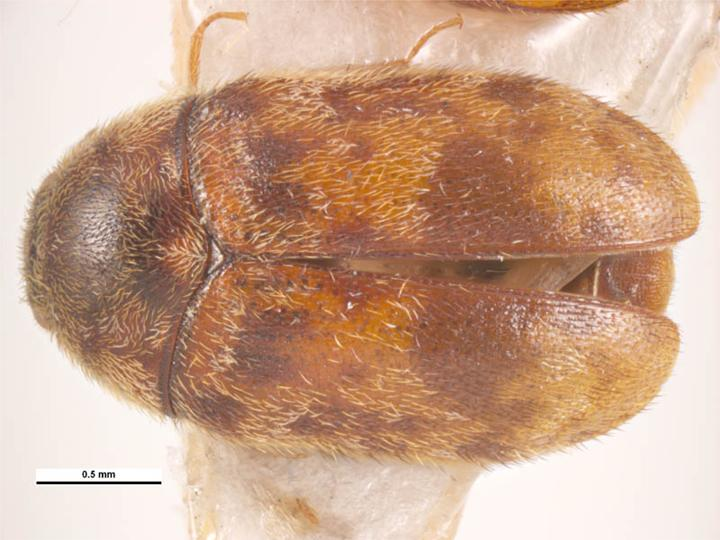

Scientific classification
- Domain: Eukaryota
- Kingdom: Animalia
- Phylum: Arthropoda
- Class: Insecta
- Order: Coleoptera
- Suborder: Polyphaga
- Family: Dermestidae
- Tribe: Megatomini
- Genus: Trogoderma
- Species: T. sternale

Binomial name
- Trogoderma sternale Jayne, 1882

= Trogoderma sternale =

Species of beetle

Trogoderma sternale is a species of carpet beetle in the family Dermestidae. It is found in North America.

== Subspecies ==
These subspecies belong to the species Trogoderma sternale:

- Trogoderma sternale sternale Jayne, 1882
- Trogoderma sternale complex Casey, 1900
- Trogoderma sternale aspericolle Casey, 1900
- Trogoderma sternale deserti Beal, 1954
- Trogoderma sternale maderae Beal, 1954
- Trogoderma sternale plagifer Casey, 1916
