= Anthrenocerus variabilis =

Scientific classification
- Kingdom: Animalia
- Phylum: Arthropoda
- Class: Insecta
- Order: Coleoptera
- Suborder: Polyphaga
- Family: Dermestidae
- Genus: Anthrenocerus
- Species: A. variabilis

Binomial name
- Anthrenocerus variabilis (Reitter, 1881)

Species of beetle

Anthrenocerus variabilis is a species of beetle native to Australia. It is within the genus Anthrenocerus and the family Dermestidae.
