= Anthrenocerus armstrongi =

Scientific classification
- Domain: Eukaryota
- Kingdom: Animalia
- Phylum: Arthropoda
- Class: Insecta
- Order: Coleoptera
- Suborder: Polyphaga
- Family: Dermestidae
- Genus: Anthrenocerus
- Species: A. armstrongi

Binomial name
- Anthrenocerus armstrongi Roach 2000

Species of beetle

Anthrenocerus armstrongi is a species of beetle, native to Australia. It is within the Anthrenocerus genus, and the family Dermestidae.
