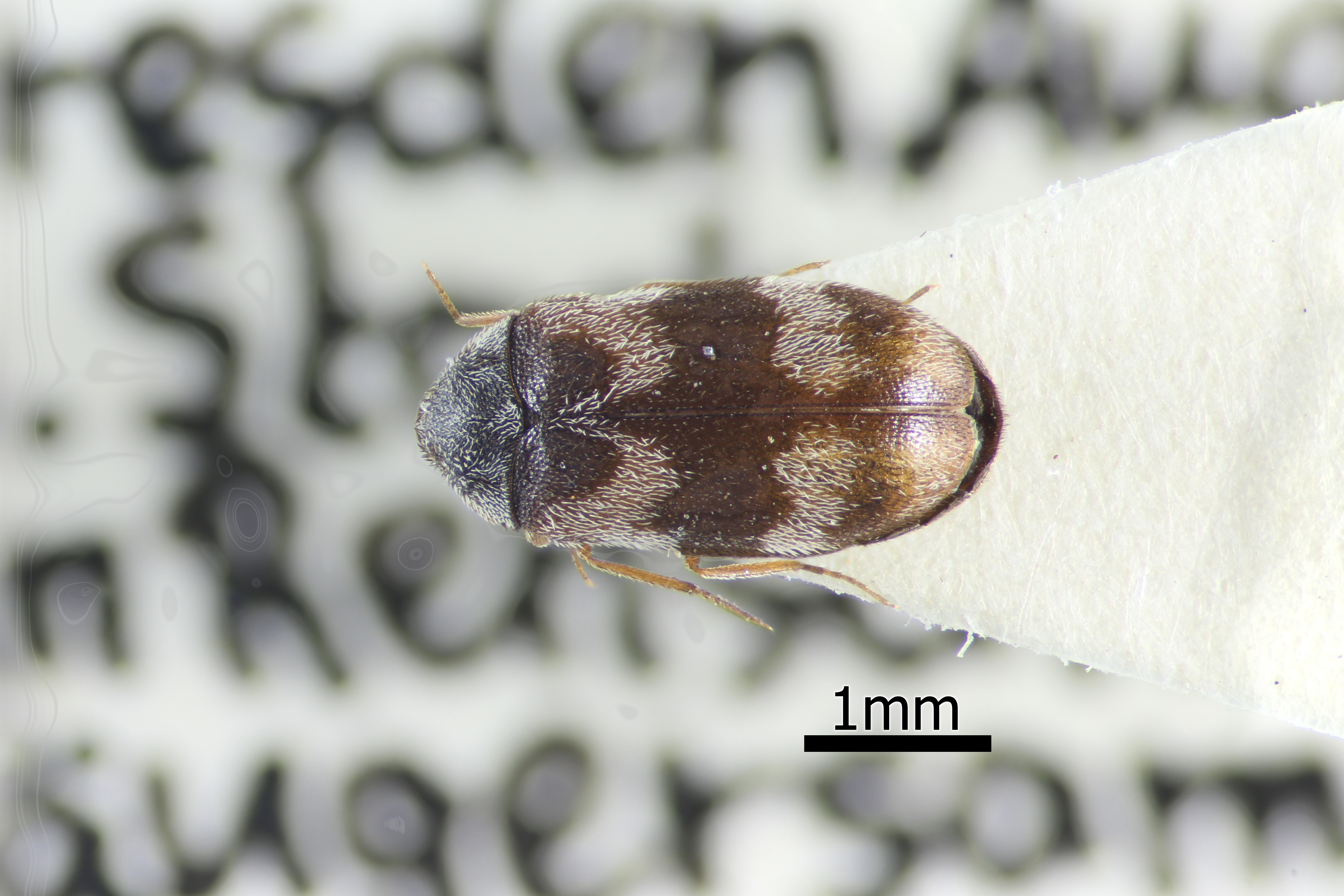
- Eurhopalus angustus, also known as Trogoderma angustum

Scientific classification
- Domain: Eukaryota
- Kingdom: Animalia
- Phylum: Arthropoda
- Class: Insecta
- Order: Coleoptera
- Suborder: Polyphaga
- Family: Dermestidae
- Subfamily: Megatominae
- Tribe: Megatomini
- Subtribe: Trogodermina
- Genus: Eurhopalus; Solier in Gay, 1849

= Eurhopalus =

Genus of beetles

Eurhopalus is a genus of beetles in the family Dermestidae. The genus was revised in 2022 to include several genera, along with species previously placed in the genus Trogoderma.

== Taxonomy ==
Recent research indicates that Trogoderma is polyphyletic, comprising two distinct, unrelated lineages. One lineage corresponds to Trogoderma sensu stricto - a primarily Holarctic clade that includes the type species Trogoderma glabrum and the economically significant Khapra beetle (Trogoderma granarium). The other lineage, formerly considered part of Trogoderma, represents a distinct Southern Hemisphere clade, reclassified under the previously synonymized genus Eurhopalus. This clade includes species previously assigned to several genera: Sodaliatoma Háva, monotypic Reesa Beal, Psacus Pascoe, Neoanthrenus Armstrong, Anthrenocerus Arrow, and Myrmeanthrenus Armstrong.

This classification is not yet accepted by all researchers. For example, in the 2023 world catalogue of Dermestidae many of the genera previously synonymized were re-evaluated and reinstated as separate genera, despite genetic and morphological analyses suggesting otherwise.

=== Neoanthrenus ===
The synonymized genus Neoanthrenus was originally defined in 1941. However, in 2013, researchers reclassified the species of the genus, placing them under the subgenus Nathrenus within Anthrenus. This taxonomic change did not take into account the considerable morphological differences between the adults and larvae of Neoanthrenus species and those of Anthrenus, and later authors recognize significant distinctions between these groups.

Further phylogenetic studies in 2006, along with molecular analyses in 2022, support the distinction between these two genera, and place Neoanthrenus as a synonym of Eurhopalus rather than Anthrenus.
