= Eurhopalus stellatus =

Scientific classification
- Kingdom: Animalia
- Phylum: Arthropoda
- Clade: Pancrustacea
- Class: Insecta
- Order: Coleoptera
- Suborder: Polyphaga
- Family: Dermestidae
- Genus: Eurhopalus
- Species: E. stellatus

Binomial name
- Eurhopalus stellatus (Roach, 2000)

Synonyms
- Anthrenocerus stellatus Roach, 2000

Species of beetle

Eurhopalus stellatus is a species of beetles in the family Dermestidae. It is native to Australia. It is known from Queensland.
