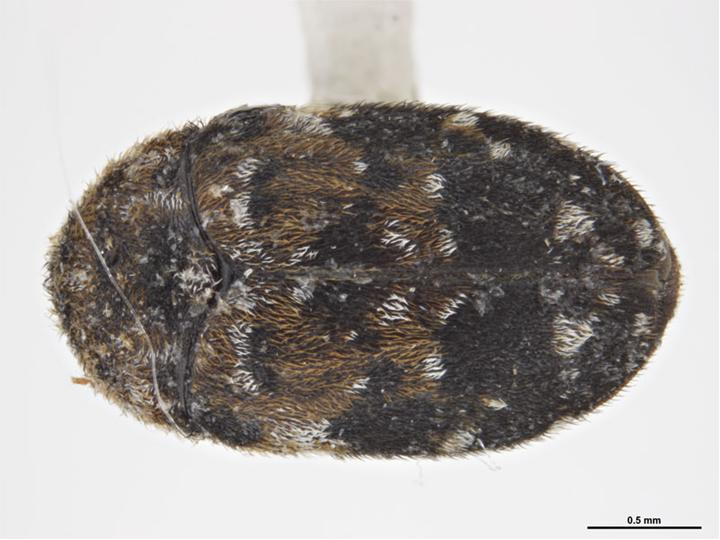

Scientific classification
- Kingdom: Animalia
- Phylum: Arthropoda
- Clade: Pancrustacea
- Class: Insecta
- Order: Coleoptera
- Suborder: Polyphaga
- Family: Dermestidae
- Tribe: Megatomini
- Genus: Trogoderma
- Species: T. serraticorne

Binomial name
- Trogoderma serraticorne (Fabricius, 1792)

Synonyms
- Anthrenus serraticornis Fabricius, 1792; Anthrenus denticornis Fabricius, 1792; Eucnocerus anthrenoides Sharp, 1902; Trogoderma anthrenoides (Sharp, 1902)

= Trogoderma serraticorne =

Species of beetle

Trogoderma serraticorne is a species of carpet beetle in the family Dermestidae, formerly known as Trogoderma anthrenoides.
