= Anthrenocerus trimaculatus =

Scientific classification
- Domain: Eukaryota
- Kingdom: Animalia
- Phylum: Arthropoda
- Class: Insecta
- Order: Coleoptera
- Suborder: Polyphaga
- Family: Dermestidae
- Genus: Anthrenocerus
- Species: A. trimaculatus

Binomial name
- Anthrenocerus trimaculatus Armstrong, 1943

Species of beetle

Anthrenocerus trimaculatus is a species of beetle, native to Australia. It is within the genus Anthrenocerus and the family Dermestidae.
