= Anthrenocerus nebulosus =

Scientific classification
- Domain: Eukaryota
- Kingdom: Animalia
- Phylum: Arthropoda
- Class: Insecta
- Order: Coleoptera
- Suborder: Polyphaga
- Family: Dermestidae
- Genus: Anthrenocerus
- Species: A. nebulosus

Binomial name
- Anthrenocerus nebulosus Roach, 2000

Species of beetle

Anthrenocerus nebulosus is a species of beetles, native to Australia. It is within the genus Anthrenocerus and the family Dermestidae.
