= Anthrenocerus confertus =

Scientific classification
- Kingdom: Animalia
- Phylum: Arthropoda
- Class: Insecta
- Order: Coleoptera
- Suborder: Polyphaga
- Family: Dermestidae
- Genus: Anthrenocerus
- Species: A. confertus

Binomial name
- Anthrenocerus confertus (Reitter, 1881)

Species of beetle

Anthrenocerus confertus is a species of beetle, native to Australia. It is within the genus Anthrenocerus and the family Dermestidae.
