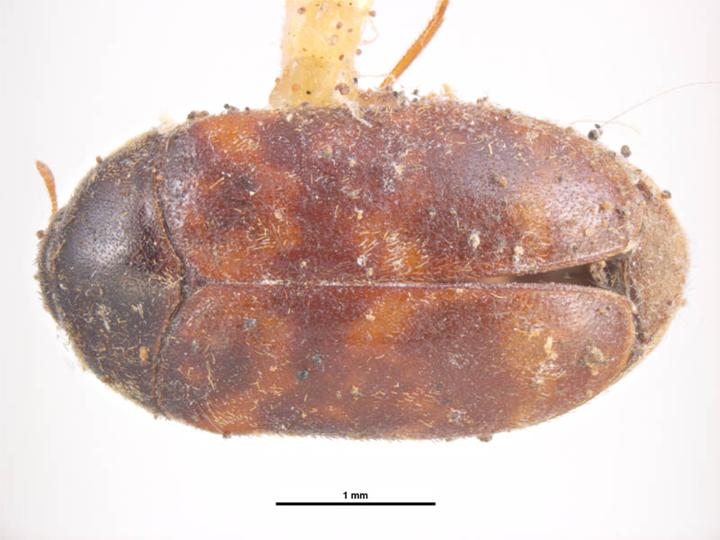

Scientific classification
- Kingdom: Animalia
- Phylum: Arthropoda
- Class: Insecta
- Order: Coleoptera
- Suborder: Polyphaga
- Family: Dermestidae
- Genus: Trogoderma
- Species: T. ornatum

Binomial name
- Trogoderma ornatum (Say, 1825)

= Trogoderma ornatum =

Species of beetle

Trogoderma ornatum, known generally as the ornate carpet beetle or ornate cabinet beetle, is a species of carpet beetle in the family Dermestidae. It is found in North America and Oceania.
