= Anthrenocerus pilatus =

Scientific classification
- Domain: Eukaryota
- Kingdom: Animalia
- Phylum: Arthropoda
- Class: Insecta
- Order: Coleoptera
- Suborder: Polyphaga
- Family: Dermestidae
- Genus: Anthrenocerus
- Species: A. pilatus

Binomial name
- Anthrenocerus pilatus Roach, 2000

Species of beetle

Anthrenocerus pilatus is a species of beetles, native to Australia. It is within the genus Anthrenocerus and the family Dermestidae.
