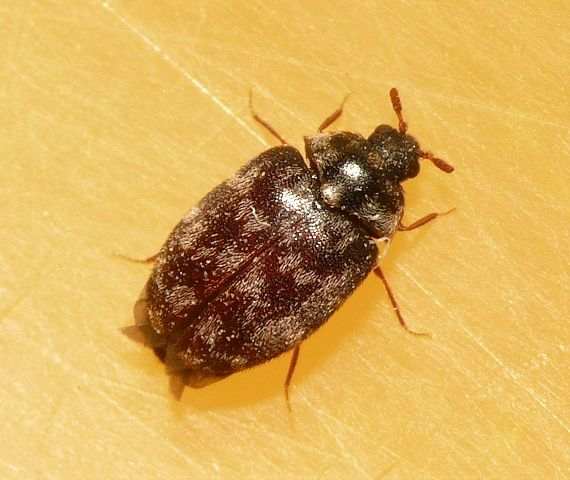

Scientific classification
- Kingdom: Animalia
- Phylum: Arthropoda
- Clade: Pancrustacea
- Class: Insecta
- Order: Coleoptera
- Suborder: Polyphaga
- Family: Dermestidae
- Genus: Anthrenocerus
- Species: A. australis

Binomial name
- Anthrenocerus australis (Hope, 1843)

= Anthrenocerus australis =

Species of beetle

Anthrenocerus australis, commonly known as the Australian carpet beetle, is a species of beetle belonging to the Dermestidae family. It is one of the most researched of the thirty-one species in the genus Anthrenocerus. This is generally attributed to its prevalence throughout Australia and New Zealand and the negative economic and agricultural impact it has as a pest. It is the larvae that causes damage to products, not the adult beetle. The total life cycle of this insect is around three years, most of which is spent as a larva. Once the beetle reaches maturity, it only lives for between two and six weeks.

== Physical description ==
The adult A. australis is a dark brown and black oval beetle, which grows to be around 2.2-2.5mm long. At the front of the head are two small eyes and a pair of antennae. Below are six outward facing legs and a mouth. The back of the beetle's body has a hardened shell to provide protection for the delicate wings which retract beneath when the beetle is not in flight. When disturbed or threatened the beetle will freeze up and fold their legs into their body.

The A. australis larvae are hairy and stretched to form an eruciform (caterpillar-like) shape. They are "grub-like"and can grow up to 7mm long, have a head and mouth with six legs at the front of the body and an extended abdomen. The larvae are covered in spicisetae which are long hairs that provide protection for the adolescent against predators. Upon perceiving a threat, the hairs are erected to sharp needles, and lodge themselves into the predator. A notable feature of the A. australis larvae is their white and tan "colourful and distinctive patterned" complete setal bands.

== Life cycle ==
After mating, the female flies to a location where the eggs are hidden and safe and, when hatched, the larvae can feed on. Capable of laying up to forty tiny "oval shaped and cream coloured eggs", smaller than one millimetre, the female lays each egg at a different location in crevasses of fibrous or animal products such as wool, cotton, or the hair and skin of dead animals. The eggs are laid separately for maximum probability of survival and generally take between ten and twenty days to hatch. The female chooses insulated and well protected commodities to lay their eggs, so upon hatching, the larvae has a source of food. Larvae hatch from eggs in the spring and early summer. Once hatched, the larvae burrow into the material they were laid in and feed. Larvae are scavengers and prefer consuming natural fibres such as "silk, leather, feathers, wool and hair; and plant fibres such as cotton and other foodstuffs. Larvae also feed on the skin and hair of dead animals and insects; and spiders' webs".

Throughout their larval stage, the immature beetle performs ecdysis (moulting) several times, marking a new stage of their development. Larvae can live for between one and three years, and during cold periods can hibernate until warmer weather returns. ). In a protected and artificial environment, such as a glass jar, Wakley noted the larvae continued to thrive for over twenty years. During warmer weather, and in a dark setting such as the source of food they have habituated, the larvae will shed its skin for the final time and become a pupa for between ten and thirty days, and finally transform into the mature A. australis beetle. Unlike its preference as a larva, the adult beetle is attracted to light and is commonly found outside searching for food and feeds on pollen and nectar from flowers. The fully-grown adult beetle will live in nests and dead animal remains. The beetle may also be found in bee, wasp and ant nests, although as they are all natural predators to A. australis, host a risk of the beetle being eaten. Some of the common predators of A. australis are "birds, mammals, lizards, frogs, ants, spiders and parasitoid wasp larvae." As a fully mature adult, A. australis’ life span is only between two and six weeks.

== Geographical distribution ==
Anthrenocerus australis was discovered by an English entomologist named Fredrick William Hope (Hope, 1843) who discovered, collected and named many species of beetles. The adult beetles do not need food to produce viable eggs. This may be a cause for the pervasive spread of the beetle, as they can reproduce on any surface even without consuming food and water. Gerrard noted the beetle’s behaviour while being studied would to be to "seek out nectar sources if possible, perhaps after laying their first batch of eggs … and encourage dispersal of the species." Because the beetle seems to prioritise reproduction over feeding, the distribution of the beetle through imported and exported products have resulted in cases all over the world including the United Kingdom, the Netherlands, Germany, France and Belgium.

Anthrenocerus australis is not affected by the British winter, indicative of their survival in Britain for the last century, but during the summer the temperature may not rise enough to promote a healthy rate of breeding. Due to this, A. australis is not considered a pest in Britain. While this beetle is not considered an important pest in these countries, A. australis has a high-ranked pest status in New Zealand.

== Pest status ==
In 1948 there were reports of large-scale infestations of A. australis in New Zealand. Today, they are considered one of the biggest economic and resource damaging pests in both the North and South island. The beetles are often found eating grain and oat in silos and dried dairy products such as casein. They are also often found in woolen carpets and fabrics, of which they also eat. Alongside agricultural issues, the beetle is a problem in museums, “attacking dried artefacts or organic origin and woolen goods”. Introduced into Britain in 1933, when an infestation was discovered and then following, became a household pest in 1945. According to records, the beetle has been discovered in many places feeding off dust, fruit and food scraps. Some of these places include a printing office, London wharf and private residences.

In New Zealand, A. australis has developed a significant resistance to the most common wool insecticide permethrin.

== Control/mitigation ==
In 1997, a study conducted in Belgium, the authors surmised that insects and mites cause around 30% of all stored food to become irreversibly damaged or eaten. Furthermore, as pesticides have become a standard practice of the mitigation of pests in agriculture, so have those pests developed a resistance to the efficacy of many pesticides. According to experts in the field of pest control and mitigation, a specific formula of chemicals containing permethrin are effective against most keratin consuming insects, including A. australis. On an industrial scale, this chemical is favoured as it is an indiscriminate chemical affecting and killing most insects who come into contact with it. Bees do not seem to be affected by the chemical, which is beneficial for farmers and the ecosystems they contribute to.

Another commonly used chemical is propiconazole, a compound which, when used to treat wool has shown results of the larvae consuming significantly less, as a result of gut or taste-related differences. While it is notably effective across a range of insects, this particular chemical showed to have the "greatest protective effect" on A. australis when dyed at as little ratio of 4:1000 on mass of wool to give full protection from the insect. While these chemicals do protect against agricultural goods, they are often discarded into waterways, poisoning almost all species of the aquatic ecosystem.

Another method more commonly used is simply storing the grain and fabric products in an environment which is not conducive to the survival of pests (Boyer, Zhang and Lempérière, 2011). Beetles require oxygen, so a low concentration of oxygen and a large concentration of carbon dioxide is a commonly practiced method of controlling the damage caused by the larvae. Concentrations of carbon dioxide 40% and more, at a consistent level, will likely kill all insects within two weeks. The cause of death is "anoxia and hypercarbia".

Due to the fact adult beetles mostly live outside, permanent mitigation is almost impossible as the beetle can return with a new batch of eggs. It is recommended that regular cleaning occur, specifically taking note to the corners and edges of carpets, and to spray with an insecticide in the time period when the larvae are likely to hatch. Reinfestation can occur on through many means including bringing cut flowers into the house.

== See also ==
Commonly confused with:

- Trogoderma glabrum
