= Eurhopalus musaicus =

Scientific classification
- Kingdom: Animalia
- Phylum: Arthropoda
- Clade: Pancrustacea
- Class: Insecta
- Order: Coleoptera
- Suborder: Polyphaga
- Family: Dermestidae
- Genus: Eurhopalus
- Species: E. musaicus

Binomial name
- Eurhopalus musaicus (Roach, 2000)

Synonyms
- Anthrenocerus musaicus Roach, 2000

Species of beetle

Eurhopalus musaicus is a species of beetles in the family Dermestidae. It is native to Australia. It is known from the Northern Territory and Western Australia.
