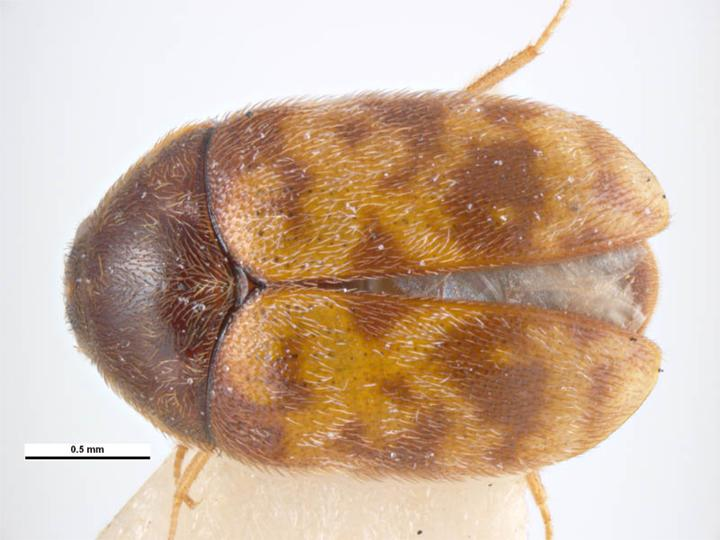

Scientific classification
- Domain: Eukaryota
- Kingdom: Animalia
- Phylum: Arthropoda
- Class: Insecta
- Order: Coleoptera
- Suborder: Polyphaga
- Family: Dermestidae
- Genus: Trogoderma
- Species: T. inclusum

Binomial name
- Trogoderma inclusum LeConte, 1854

= Trogoderma inclusum =

Species of beetle

Trogoderma inclusum, the larger cabinet beetle, is a species of carpet beetle in the family Dermestidae. It is found in Africa, Europe and Northern Asia (excluding China), North America, Oceania, and Southern Asia.
