= Anthrenocerus terzonatus =

Scientific classification
- Kingdom: Animalia
- Phylum: Arthropoda
- Clade: Pancrustacea
- Class: Insecta
- Order: Coleoptera
- Suborder: Polyphaga
- Family: Dermestidae
- Genus: Anthrenocerus
- Species: A. terzonatus

Binomial name
- Anthrenocerus terzonatus Blackburn, 1903

Species of beetle

Anthrenocerus terzonatus is a species of beetle, native to Australia. It is within the genus Anthrenocerus and the family Dermestidae.
