= Trogoderma primum =

Scientific classification
- Domain: Eukaryota
- Kingdom: Animalia
- Phylum: Arthropoda
- Class: Insecta
- Order: Coleoptera
- Suborder: Polyphaga
- Family: Dermestidae
- Tribe: Megatomini
- Genus: Trogoderma
- Species: T. primum

Binomial name
- Trogoderma primum (Jayne, 1882)

Species of beetle

Trogoderma primum is a species of carpet beetle in the family Dermestidae. It is found in North America, where it is known from Oklahoma and Texas in the United States, and from Veracruz and Chiapas in Mexico.
