= Anthrenocerus arrowi =

Scientific classification
- Domain: Eukaryota
- Kingdom: Animalia
- Phylum: Arthropoda
- Class: Insecta
- Order: Coleoptera
- Suborder: Polyphaga
- Family: Dermestidae
- Genus: Anthrenocerus
- Species: A. arrowi

Binomial name
- Anthrenocerus arrowi Armstrong 1949

Species of beetle

Anthrenocerus arrowi is a species of beetle, native to Australia. It is within the Anthrenocerus genus, and the family Dermestidae
