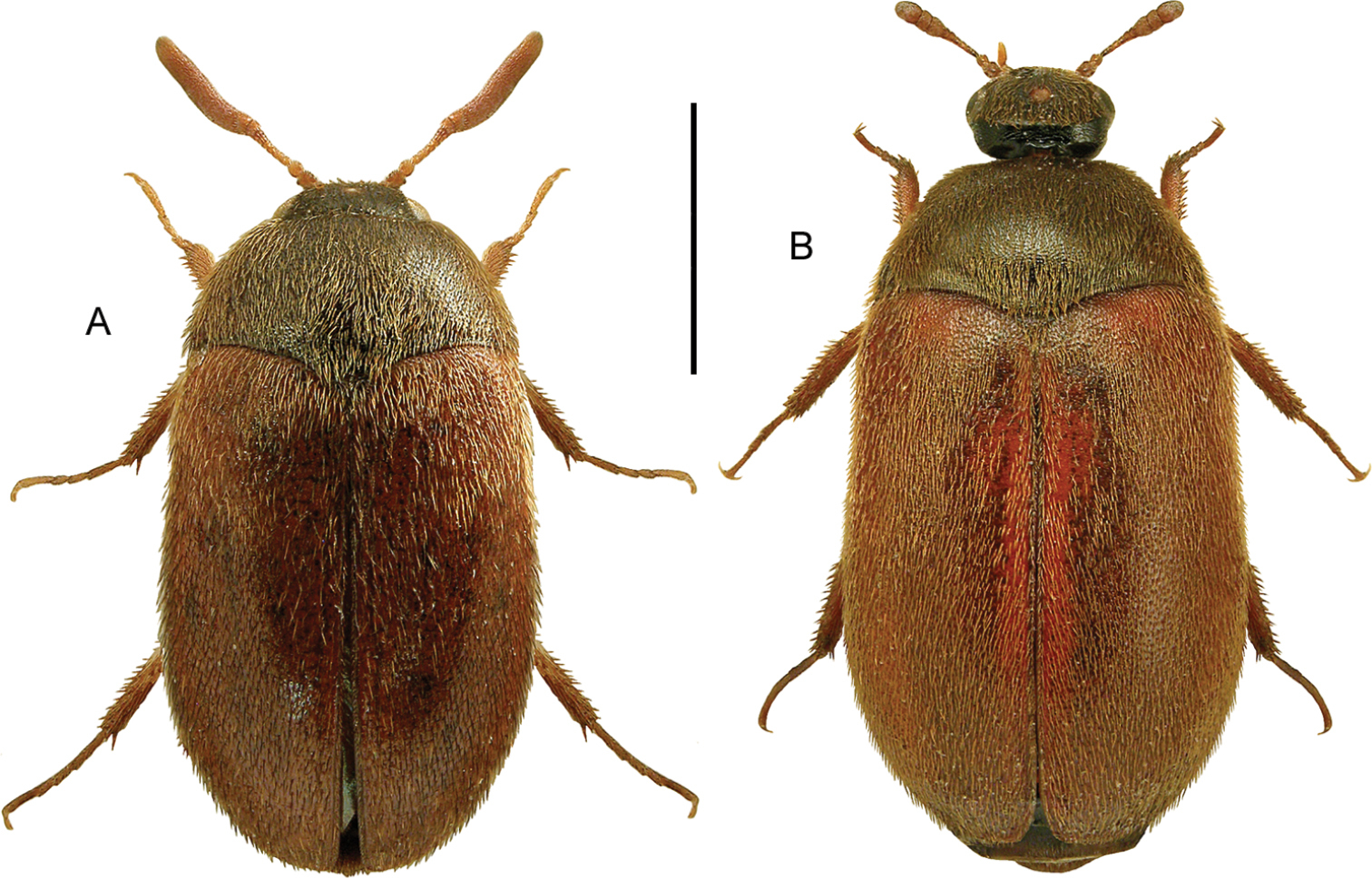
- Male and female beetles

Scientific classification
- Kingdom: Animalia
- Phylum: Arthropoda
- Clade: Pancrustacea
- Class: Insecta
- Order: Coleoptera
- Suborder: Polyphaga
- Family: Dermestidae
- Genus: Attagenus
- Species: A. smirnovi

Binomial name
- Attagenus smirnovi Zhantiev, 1973

= Attagenus smirnovi =

Species of beetle

Attagenus smirnovi, the brown carpet beetle, is a species of beetle from the family Dermestidae. It is a synanthropic pest which lives in human buildings, homes and museums and eats wool-textiles, carpets, skin and fur. Due to its specific epithet smirnovi, the beetle is also known in the United Kingdom as the 'Vodka beetle', after the Smirnoff brand of vodka.

== Features ==
Their bodies reach a length of between 2.3 and 4 millimetres. The head and pronotum are dark brown to black. Their elytra are densely hairy and light brown.

== Distribution ==
Naturally found in Africa, they have spread to Russia (where they were first observed in 1961, in Moscow, by E. S. Smirnov), the Czech Republic and other eastern European countries, along with Germany (where the first example was found in 1985 in Mecklenburg-Vorpommern), Denmark and the United Kingdom. The species was first described as a new one in 1973, by Rustem Devletovich Zhantiev, who named it Attagenus smirnovi. The museums and scientific institutions of Northern Europe set up an international project to research the brown fur beetle's distribution in Europe and how this may be related to climate change. Its research areas include which climatic conditions allow it to spread by flying from house to house.
