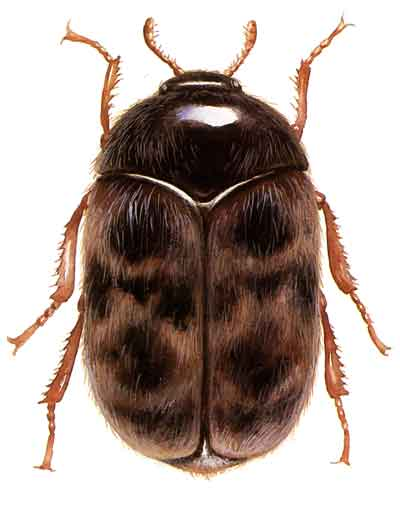
- Adult Khapra beetle
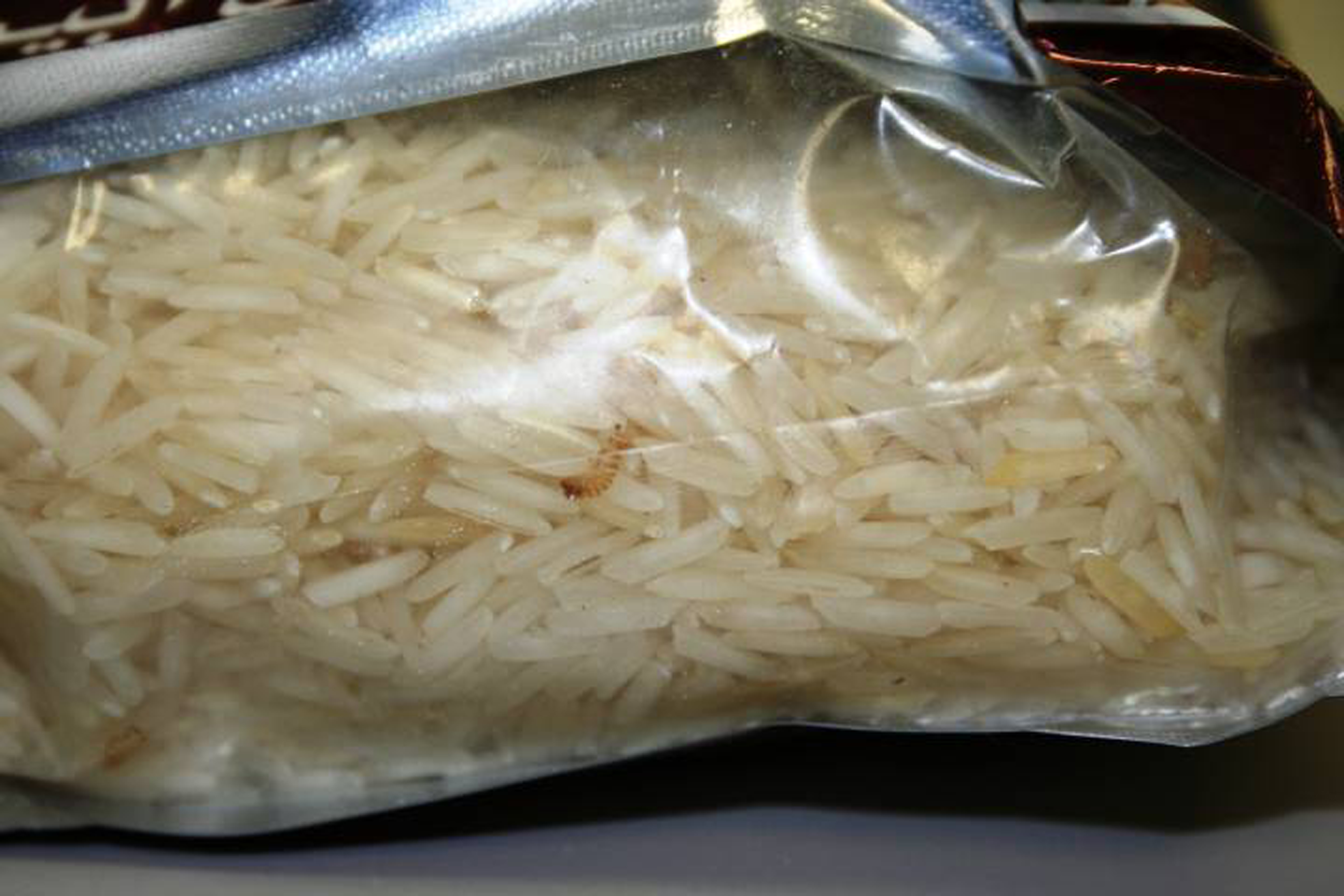
- Larva of Trogoderma granarium in dry rice

Scientific classification
- Kingdom: Animalia
- Phylum: Arthropoda
- Clade: Pancrustacea
- Class: Insecta
- Order: Coleoptera
- Suborder: Polyphaga
- Family: Dermestidae
- Genus: Trogoderma
- Species: T. granarium

Binomial name
- Trogoderma granarium Everts, 1898

= Khapra beetle =

Species of insect

The khapra beetle (Trogoderma granarium), also called cabinet beetle, is a species of beetle that originated in South Asia. It is one of the world's most destructive pests of grain products and seeds. It is considered one of the 100 worst invasive species in the world. Infestations are difficult to control because of the insect's ability to survive without food for long periods, its preference for dry conditions and low-moisture food, and its resistance to many insecticides. There is a federal quarantine restricting the importation of rice into the U.S. from countries with known infestations of the beetle. Khapra beetle infestation can spoil otherwise valuable trade goods and threaten significant economic losses if introduced to a new area. Handling or consuming contaminated grain and seed products can lead to health issues such as skin irritation and gastrointestinal distress.

== Description ==
Adult beetles are brownish and reddish, 1.6–3 mm long. Immature larvae are up to 5 millimeters long and are covered in dense, reddish-brown hair. The larval stage can last four to six weeks, but can be extended up to seven years. Males are dark brown or black, and females are slightly larger with lighter colors. The lifespan of an adult khapra beetle is usually between five and ten days. The beetle prefers hot, dry conditions and can be found in areas where grain and other potential food is stored, such as pantries, malt houses, grain and fodder processing plants, and stores of used grain sacks or crates. The species is native to India and southern Asia, with a native range extending from Burma to Western Africa. The khapra beetle is a synanthrope, predominantly living in close association with humans. Information regarding the beetle's behavior in non-human environments is limited.

The eggs of the khapra beetle are cylindrical with one end more rounded and the other more pointed, about 0.7 mm long and 0.25 mm broad, weighing about 0.02 mg. The pointy end has a number of spine-like projections. The eggs are initially a milky white but over several hours turn a pale yellowish color.

The khapra beetle's physiology is significantly impacted by its diet. Borzoi et al. found that rye provides the most optimal environment for breeding and development of individuals. Conversely, walnut and rice diets reduced female fertility and adult weight of the individuals, while increasing the duration of the larval stage.

== As an invasive species ==
The khapra beetle has become established in many Mediterranean, Middle Eastern, Asian and African countries. It has also been discovered in North America. United States customs agents have discovered it in isolated infestations on the east and west coast of the United States, but until this point have been successful in containing and eradicating the pest. US customs agents intercepted the beetle 100 times in 2011, "compared to three to six per year in 2005 and 2006, and averaging about 15 per year from 2007 to 2009". In 2017, the beetle was recorded for the first time in Sri Lanka. The beetle was found in the packaging of one consignment of tea from Sri Lanka, which was transported to Russia. The Sri Lanka Tea Board expressed that the specimen may have remained in the shipping container following the use of the same container for a previous transport of grain, not of Sri Lankan origin. Infestations of sea containers are indeed common.

The type of product in which the beetle is transported can contribute to its ability to take hold in a new environment. Whole barley flour and cracked wheat kernels were found to support significantly more larvae and adult beetles than other grain products, whereas polished pearl barley, maize, and whole oats supported lower populations.

The Khapra beetle does not present any direct ecological threats to an environment as an invasive species. Indirect effects of its introduction are of greatest concern from a human perspective. Reduced grain seed viability and loss of stored grain seeds can threaten large-scale agriculture and international trade, hence the significant focus by multiple countries on limiting its expansion.

In August 2020 unknown insects were found in a new refrigerator in Canberra, Australian Capital Territory, Australia. The buyers reported it to the federal Agriculture Department who identified the insects as Khapras. If this was already a widespread infestation—or if it was about to become one—agriculture in Australia and the economy of Australia would lose hundreds of millions of dollars per year. As a result, the department immediately began tracking, tracing, inspecting, containing, and treating for the beetles across the ACT and NSW. The department believes this report and the response to it has effectively kept Khapras out of Australia and provided new information as to how to keep them out in the future.

== Control methods ==
Fumigation with methyl bromide is the most effective treatment. Powdered neem has been used to control the beetle in wheat stores in India. Neem powder repels many insects due to its strong odor, but generally does not kill insects. However, it is still useful in protecting crops from infestations.

Research into natural pest management methods has found that extracts from Datura metel leaves present significant contact toxicity and multi-generational effects to Khapra beetles. Higher concentrations of extract led to higher mortality among the initial generation and subsequent offspring. Prolonged exposure to extreme cold and heat have demonstrated marginal impact, but most larvae were found to have survived extremes well beyond the threshold needed to kill adult beetles.

Efforts can be taken to prevent contaminated material from being shipped, sea shipping containers can be tracked, and containers can be decontaminated before reuse. There is increasing recognition that the global Khapra invasion is an emergency and requires national and international action.

== Policy and regulations ==
The United States Department of Agriculture’s Animal and Plant Health Inspection Service has established restrictions on grain and cereal imports from regions known for Khapra beetle infestation since July 2011. These import regulations concern the import of rice, chickpeas, safflower seeds, and soybeans from regions determined to be infested with the Khapra beetle. Any of these products shipped from regions in question must first be subject to a phytosanitary treatment, and a certificate stating the shipment has been inspected and found clean must be included with the product. Many North African, Middle East, and South Asian countries, such as Afghanistan, Iran, Egypt, Syria, Morocco, Sri Lanka, and India are subject to these regulations. An amendment to the Khapra beetle import regulations was passed in December 2014, adding Kuwait, Oman, Qatar, the United Arab Emirates, South Sudan, and Palestinian Authority to the list of regulated nations.

Australia maintains Khapra beetle import restrictions on all types of seeds, nuts, spices, dried fruits and vegetables, and any unprocessed agricultural products. Any imports of these products require a phytosanitary certificate stating the product is inspected and cleaned. Countries of origin in question for this policy include much of Africa, the Middle East, and South Asia.
