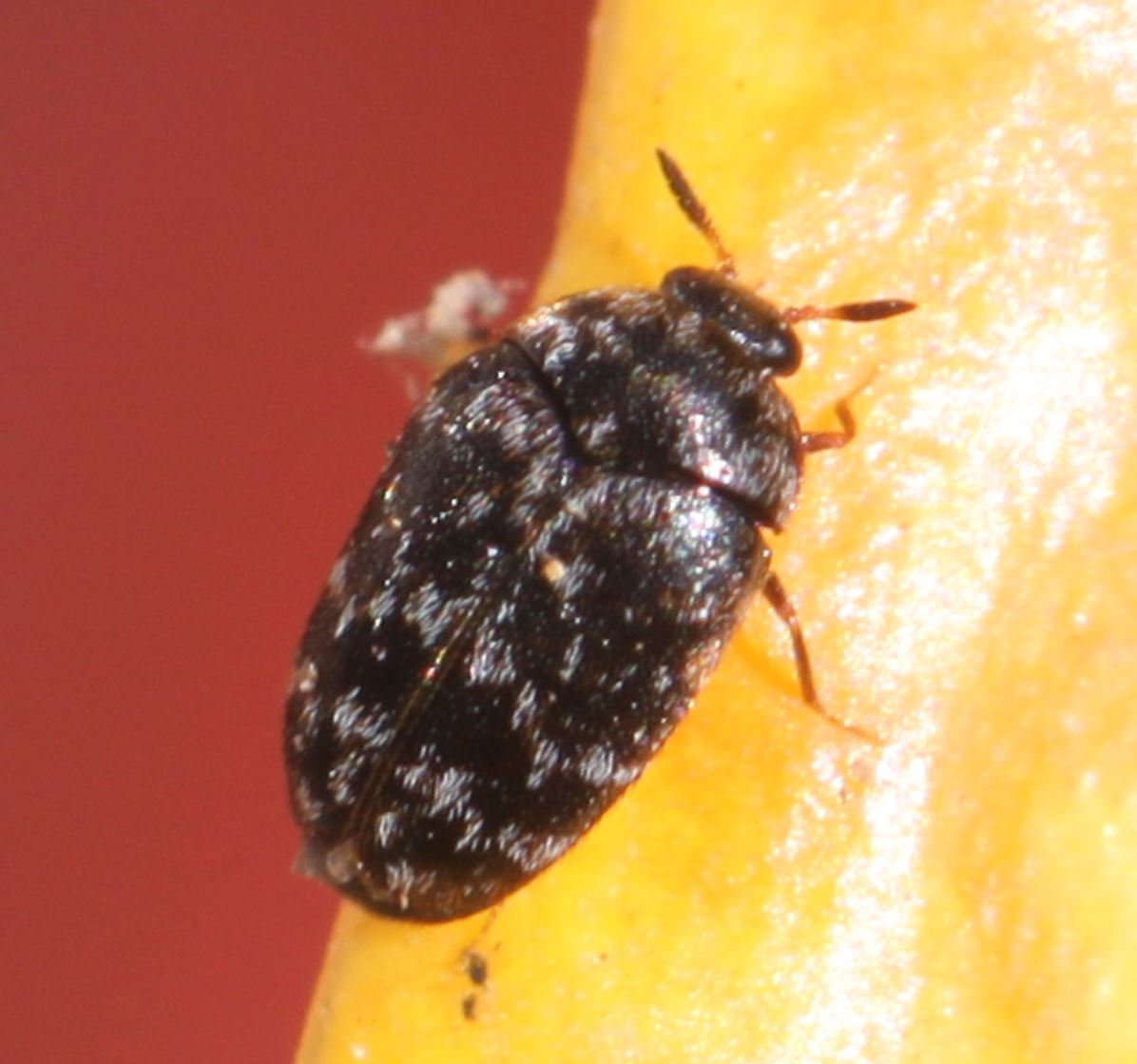

Scientific classification
- Kingdom: Animalia
- Phylum: Arthropoda
- Class: Insecta
- Order: Coleoptera
- Suborder: Polyphaga
- Family: Dermestidae
- Tribe: Megatomini
- Genus: Trogoderma
- Species: T. glabrum

Binomial name
- Trogoderma glabrum (Herbst, 1783)

= Trogoderma glabrum =

Species of beetle

Trogoderma glabrum, known generally as the glabrous cabinet beetle or colored cabinet beetle, is a species of carpet beetle in the family Dermestidae. It is found in Europe and Northern Asia (excluding China) and North America.

== See also ==
Commonly confused with:

- Anthrenocerus australis
