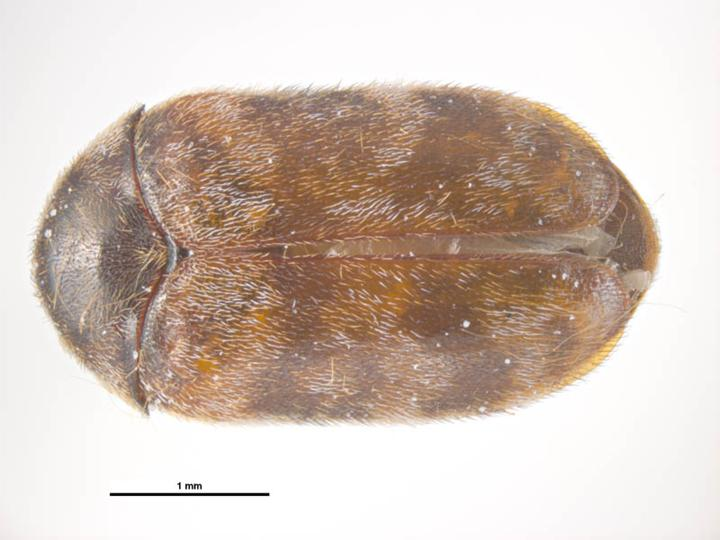
- Adult beetle
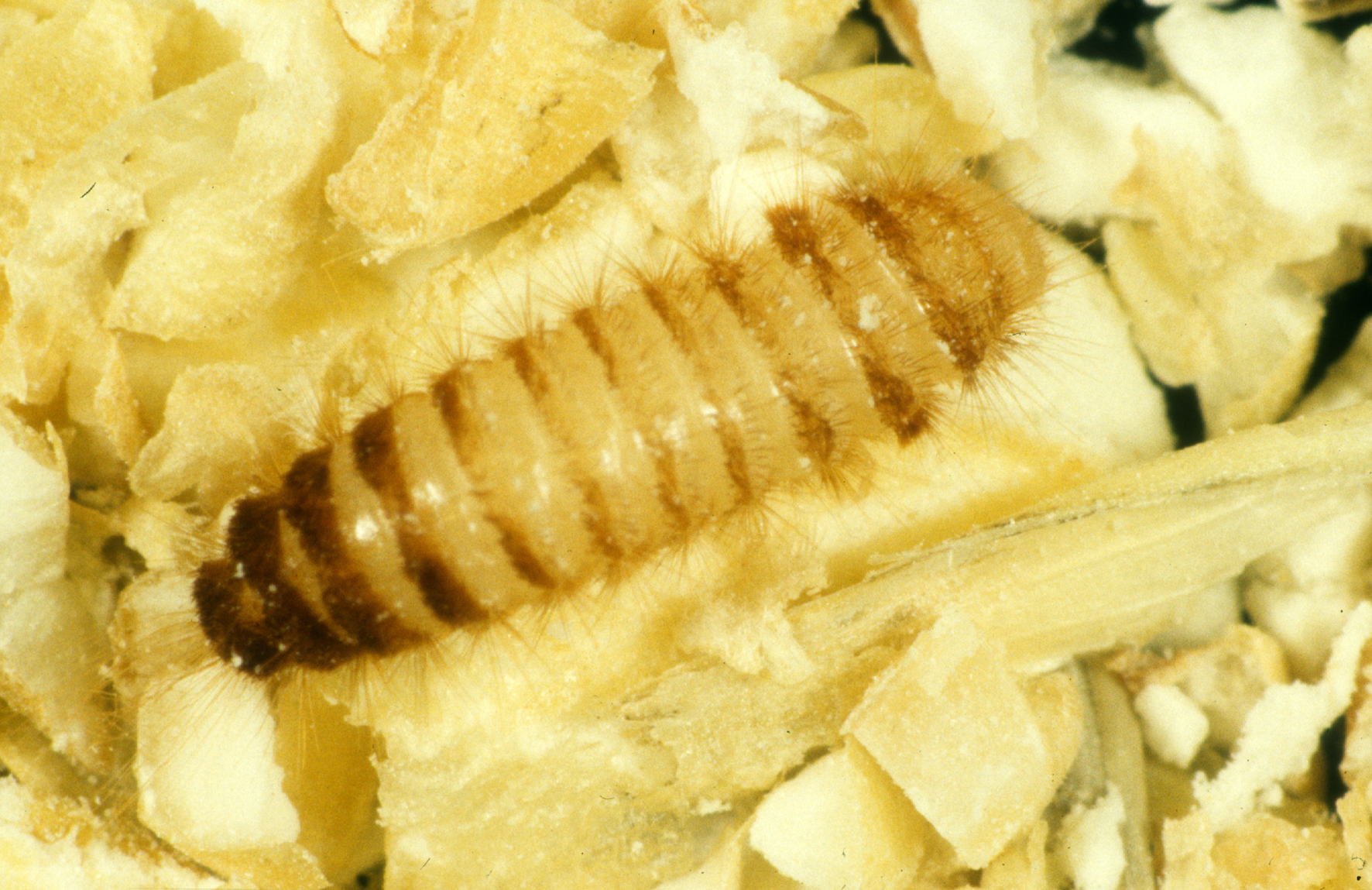
- Larva

Scientific classification
- Domain: Eukaryota
- Kingdom: Animalia
- Phylum: Arthropoda
- Class: Insecta
- Order: Coleoptera
- Suborder: Polyphaga
- Family: Dermestidae
- Tribe: Megatomini
- Genus: Trogoderma
- Species: T. variabile

Binomial name
- Trogoderma variabile Ballion, 1878

Synonyms
- Trogoderma parabile Beal, 1954

= Trogoderma variabile =

Species of beetle

Trogoderma variabile, commonly known as the warehouse beetle, is a species of carpet beetle in the family Dermestidae. It is found across Europe, Asia, Central America, North America and Oceania.

== Description ==
Adult warehouse beetles average about 3.2 mm (0.13 in) in length and are some shade of reddish-brown, dark brown or blackish-brown. The larvae are cream coloured or some darker shade of brown, and average 6 mm (0.24 in) in length when fully grown; they have long bristles at the tip of the abdomen.

== Distribution and habitat ==
This beetle may have originated in Central Asia, but is now widely distributed, being found in Russia, China, parts of the Middle East, Europe, Central America, North America and Oceania. It is an economic pest in a range of dry goods including animal foods, wheat and barley kernels, wholemeal flour, corn meal, oat meal, noodles and other cereal-based foodstuffs. It also infests animal detritus, fish meal, spices, nuts, cocoa and sugar products. In the indoor environment it occurs in warehouses, granaries, food stores and dwellings, and outdoors in Russia, it has been found in bee nests.

== Life cycle ==
Eggs are laid in suitable dry materials, and if kept in the temperature range 20 to 38 °C (68 to 100 °F), hatch in about a week. There are normally six instars, and some mature larvae enter an active diapause, especially in cooler habitats, and may remain in the larval state for two years. Non-diapausing larvae pupate near the surface of the foodstuff about seven weeks after the eggs were laid; the pupation period lasts about four days, and the new adults rest for two to seven days before emerging from the last larval skin. Longevity for males is nine days at 40 °C (104 °F) and several weeks under cooler conditions. Females also live longer at lower temperatures.
