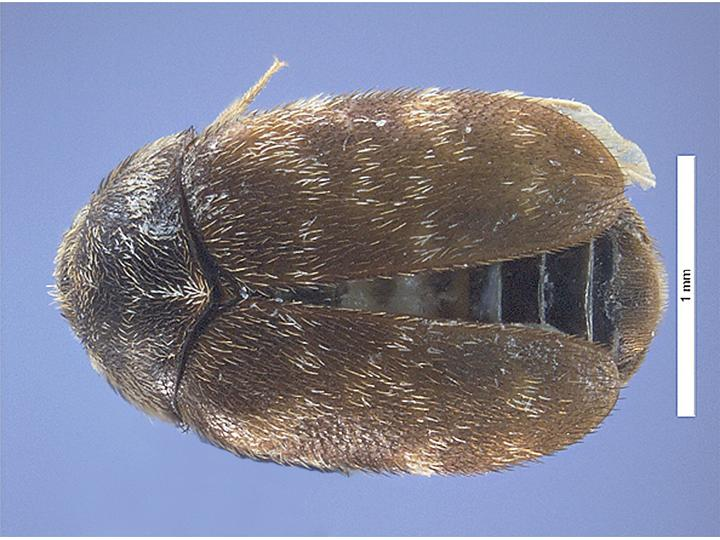
- Khapra beetle (Trogoderma granarium)

Scientific classification
- Kingdom: Animalia
- Phylum: Arthropoda
- Clade: Pancrustacea
- Class: Insecta
- Order: Coleoptera
- Suborder: Polyphaga
- Family: Dermestidae
- Tribe: Megatomini
- Genus: Trogoderma; Dejean, 1821

= Trogoderma =

Genus of beetles

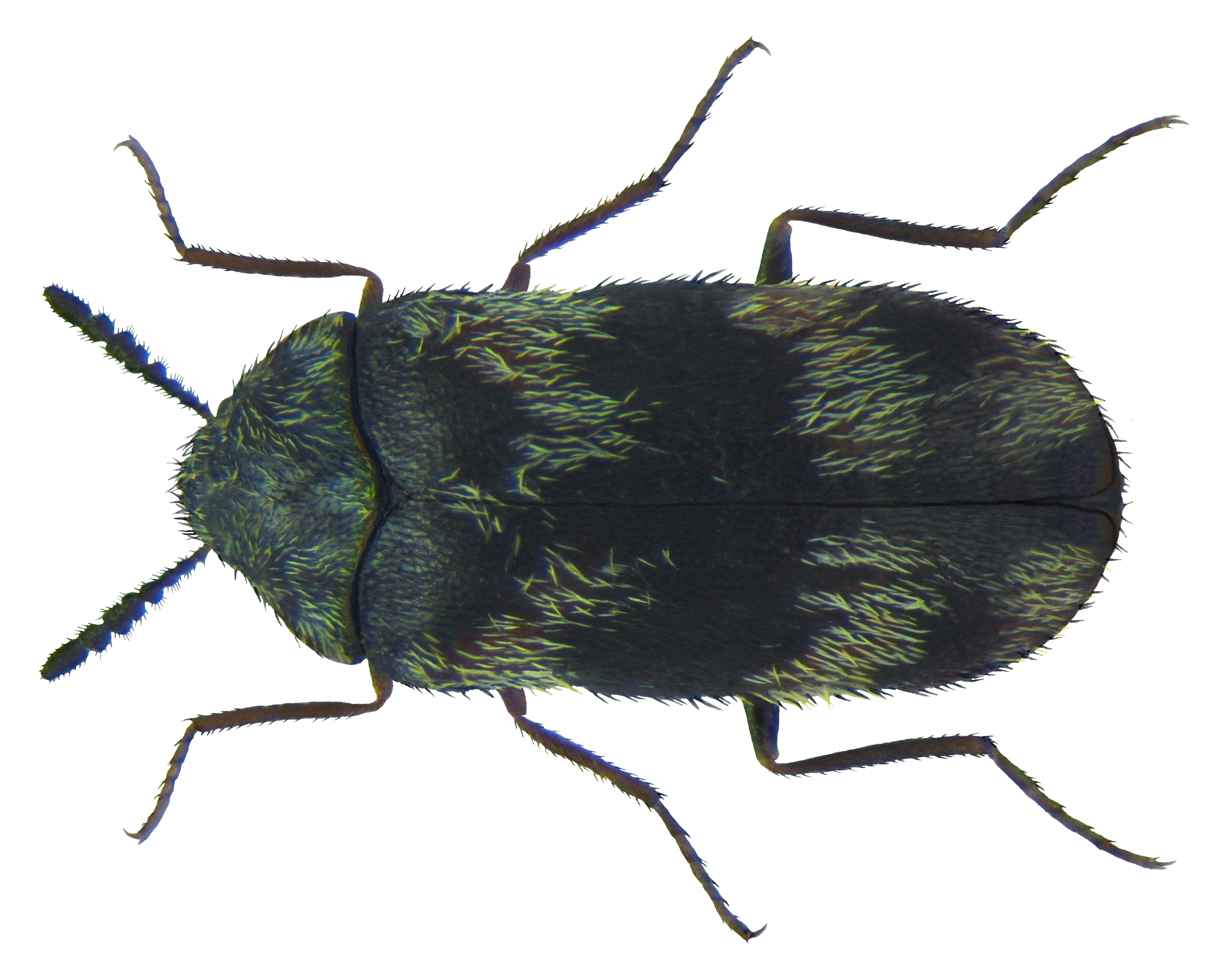
Trogoderma angustum

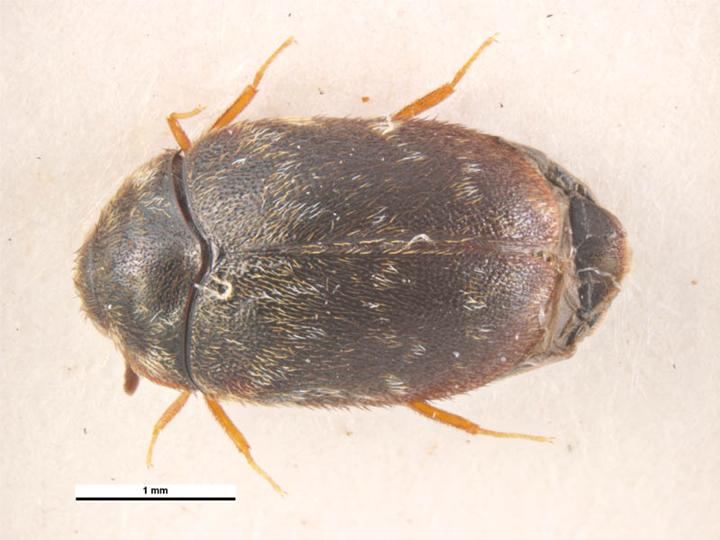
Trogoderma glabrum

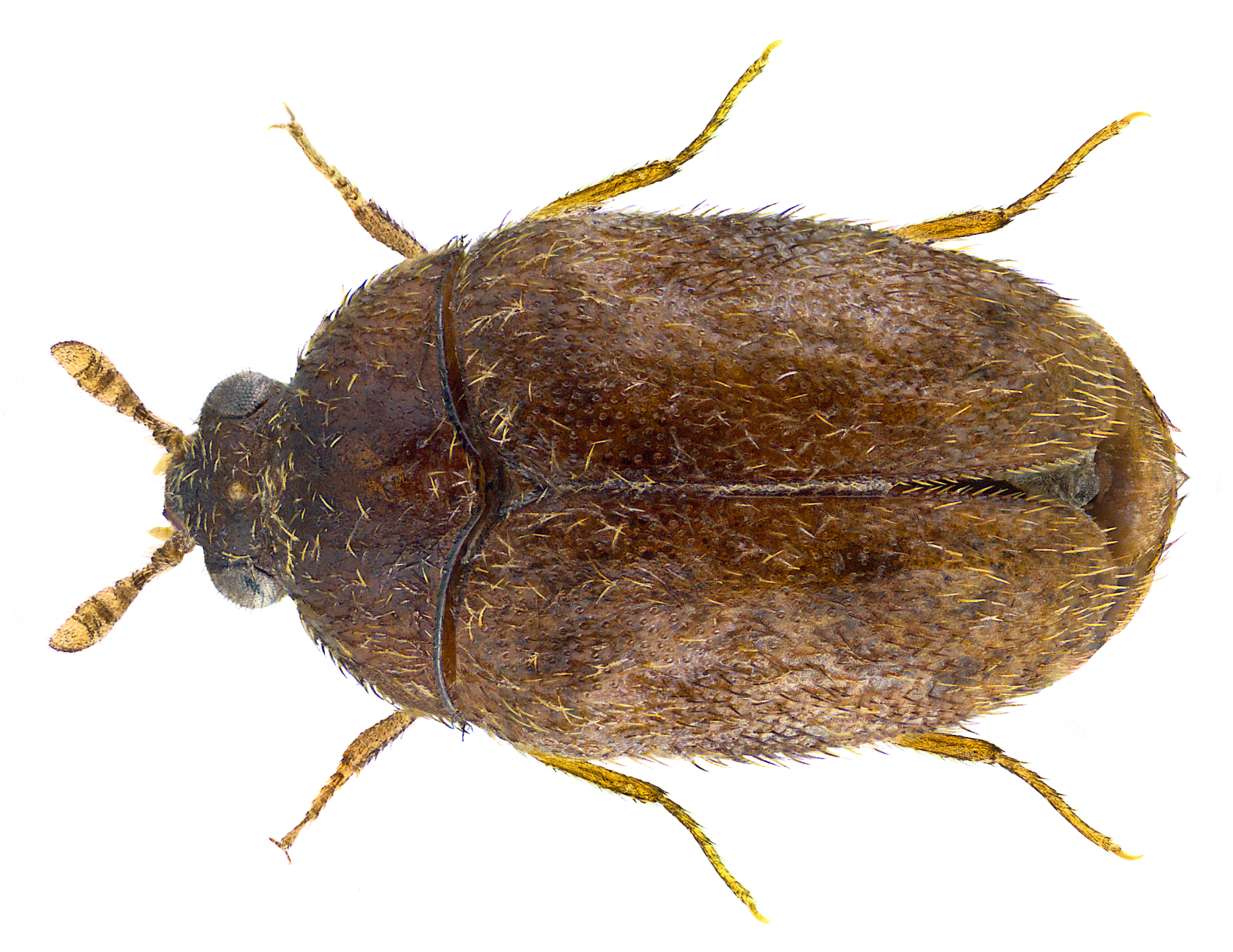
Trogoderma granarium

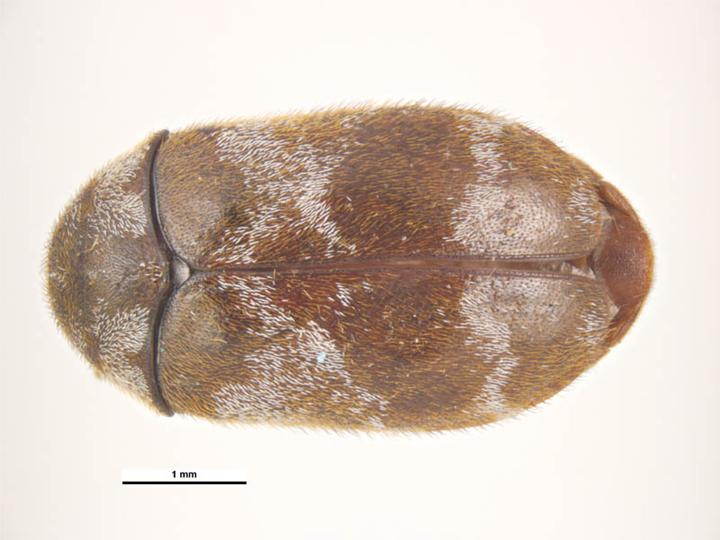
Trogoderma megatomoides

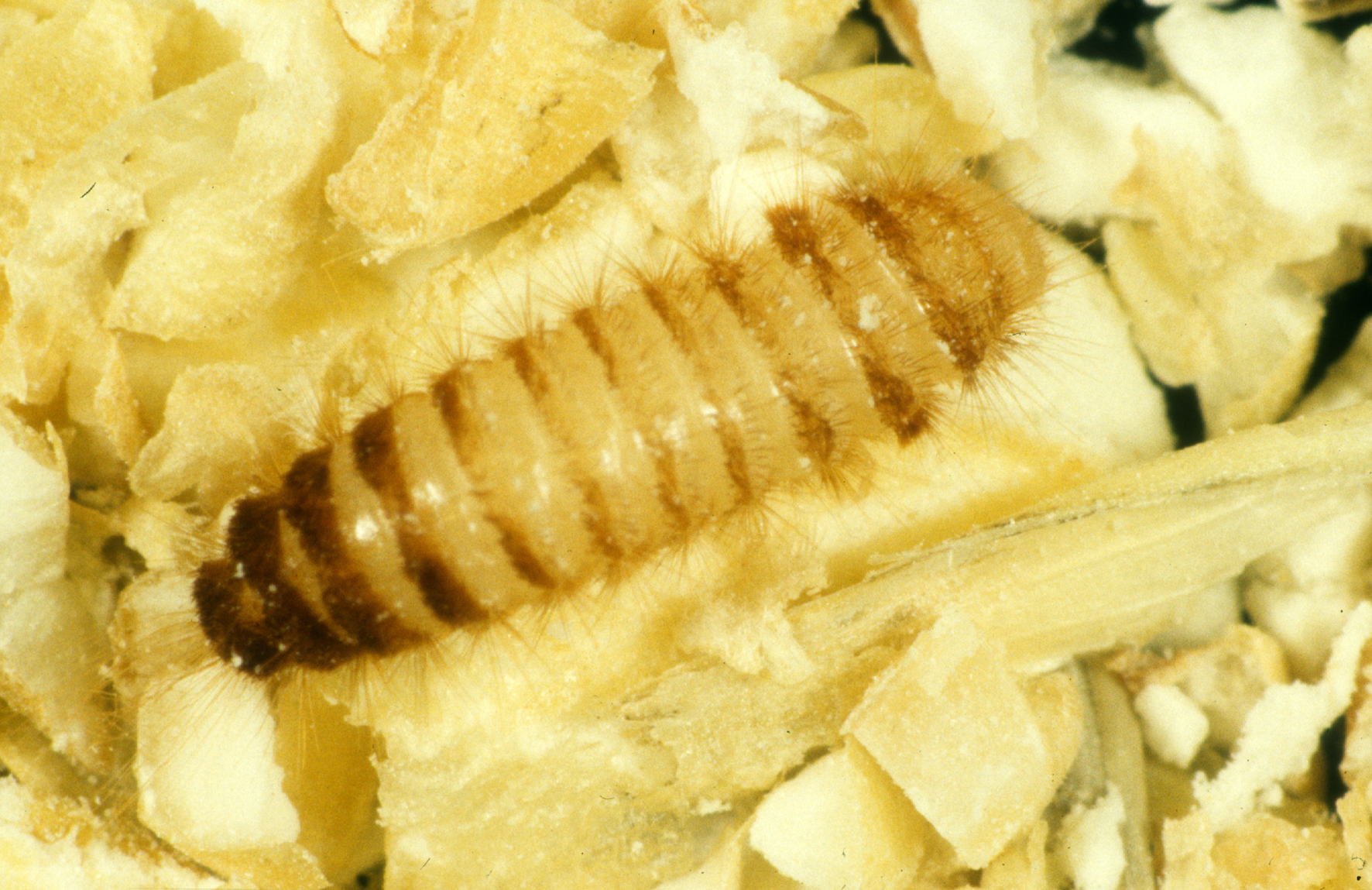
Trogoderma variabile larva

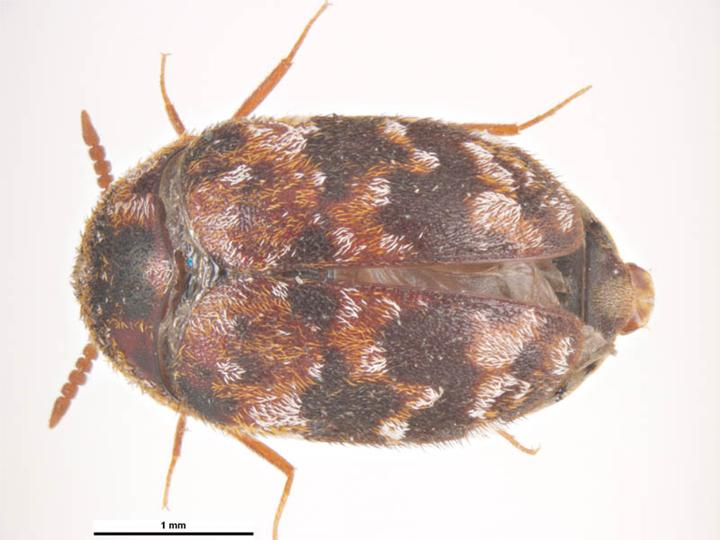
Trogoderma versicolor

Trogoderma is a genus of beetles in the family Dermestidae, the skin beetles. There are about 135 species worldwide.

Some species are pests of stored animal and plant products.

== Taxonomy ==
Recent research shows that Trogoderma (in its broad, traditional definition) is polyphyletic. Many species in the Southern Hemisphere are in a clade that is genetically distinct from the Holarctic species clade, which led to their proposed reclassification under the genus Eurhopalus (Zhou et al., 2022). However, this change is not widely adopted - e.g., the World Dermestidae Catalogue (Jiří Háva, 2023) still recognizes the old classification system and actively reinstated several genera synonymized with Eurhopalus.

== Species ==
- Trogoderma adelaideum Blackburn, 1891
- Trogoderma albonotatum Reiche, 1868
- Trogoderma alpicorum Blackburn, 1891
- Trogoderma americanum Dejean, 1837
- Trogoderma angustum Solier, 1849
- Trogoderma antennale Broun, 1893
- Trogoderma antipodum Blackburn, 1891
- Trogoderma apicale MacLeay, 1871
- Trogoderma apicipenne Reitter, 1881
- Trogoderma arcanum Zhantiev, 2002
- Trogoderma armstrongi Háva, 2003
- Trogoderma asperatum Fauvel, 1903
- Trogoderma atrum Philippi & Philippi, 1864
- Trogoderma attagenoides Pascoe, 1866
- Trogoderma bactrianum Zhantiev, 1970
- Trogoderma baeri Pic, 1915
- Trogoderma ballfinchae Beal, 1954
- Trogoderma beali Mroczkowski, 1968
- Trogoderma bicinctum Reitter, 1881
- Trogoderma blackburni Lea, 1908
- Trogoderma boganense Armstrong, 1942
- Trogoderma caboverdianum Kalík, 1986
- Trogoderma callubriense Armstrong, 1945
- Trogoderma carteri Armstrong, 1942
- Trogoderma cavum Beal, 1982
- Trogoderma celatum Sharp, 1902
- Trogoderma consors Arrow, 1915
- Trogoderma davidsoni Háva & Kadej, 2006
- Trogoderma debilius Blackburn, 1903
- Trogoderma denticorne Normand, 1936
- Trogoderma deserti Beal, 1954
- Trogoderma difficile Blackburn, 1891
- Trogoderma dominicanum Háva & Kadej, 2006
- Trogoderma ellipticum Armstrong, 1942
- Trogoderma explanaticolle Armstrong, 1942
- Trogoderma exsul Blackburn, 1903
- Trogoderma eyrense Blackburn, 1891
- Trogoderma fantasticum Háva & Kadej, 2006
- Trogoderma fasciferum Blatchley, 1914
- Trogoderma frater Arrow, 1915
- Trogoderma froggatti Blackburn, 1892
- Trogoderma glabrum (Herbst, 1783)
- Trogoderma granarium Everts, 1898 – Khapra beetle
- Trogoderma granulatum Broun, 1886
- Trogoderma grassmani Beal, 1954
- Trogoderma halsteadi Veer & Rao, 1994
- Trogoderma hobartense Armstrong, 1942
- Trogoderma impressiceps Pic, 1915
- Trogoderma inclusum LeConte, 1854
- Trogoderma inconspicuum Armstrong, 1942
- Trogoderma insulare Chevrolat, 1863
- Trogoderma irroratum Reitter, 1881
- Trogoderma kaliki Háva, 2006
- Trogoderma koenigi Pic, 1954
- Trogoderma laevipenne Armstrong, 1942
- Trogoderma larvale Háva, Prokop & Herrmann, 2006
- Trogoderma leai Armstrong, 1942
- Trogoderma lindense Blackburn, 1891
- Trogoderma longisetosum Chao & Lee, 1966
- Trogoderma longius Blackburn, 1903
- Trogoderma macleayi Blackburn, 1891
- Trogoderma madecassum Pic, 1924
- Trogoderma maderae Beal, 1954
- Trogoderma maestum Broun, 1880
- Trogoderma marginicolle Armstrong, 1942
- Trogoderma mauricepici Háva, 2003
- Trogoderma maurulum Blackburn, 1903
- Trogoderma megatomoides Reitter, 1881
- Trogoderma melanarium Sturm, 1843
- Trogoderma mexicanum Reitter, 1881
- Trogoderma meyricki Blackburn, 1891
- Trogoderma mongolicum Zhantiev, 1973
- Trogoderma morio Erichson, 1842
- Trogoderma nigrobrunneum Armstrong, 1942
- Trogoderma nigronitidum Armstrong, 1945
- Trogoderma nitens Arrow, 1915
- Trogoderma obscurum Pic, 1936
- Trogoderma occidentale Blackburn, 1891
- Trogoderma octaedron Peyerimhoff, 1943
- Trogoderma okumurai Beal, 1964
- Trogoderma ornatum (Say, 1825)
- Trogoderma paralia Beal, 1954
- Trogoderma parvum Armstrong, 1942
- Trogoderma pectinicornis Reitter, 1881
- Trogoderma peruvianum Pic, 1954
- Trogoderma picinum Armstrong, 1945
- Trogoderma plagifer Casey, 1916
- Trogoderma primum (Jayne, 1882)
- Trogoderma punctatum Broun, 1886
- Trogoderma puncticolle Broun, 1914
- Trogoderma quadrifasciatum Broun, 1893
- Trogoderma reitteri Blackburn, 1892
- Trogoderma rubiginosum Solier, 1849
- Trogoderma ruficolle Reitter, 1881
- Trogoderma rufipenne Armstrong, 1942
- Trogoderma rufonotatum Pic, 1942
- Trogoderma rufopictum Arrow, 1915
- Trogoderma schawalleri Háva, 2007
- Trogoderma schmorli Reitter, 1881
- Trogoderma seminigrum Pic, 1915
- Trogoderma serraticorne (Fabricius, 1792)
- Trogoderma serratum Dejean, 1837
- Trogoderma serrigerum Sharp, 1877
- Trogoderma setulosum Armstrong, 1942
- Trogoderma signatum Sharp, 1877
- Trogoderma silvicolum Armstrong, 1949
- Trogoderma simplex Jayne, 1882
- Trogoderma sinense Pic, 1927
- Trogoderma singulare Blackburn, 1891
- Trogoderma sinistrum Fall, 1926
- Trogoderma socium Lea, 1895
- Trogoderma stachi Mroczkowski, 1958
- Trogoderma sternale Jayne, 1882
- Trogoderma subfascia (Dahl, 1823)
- Trogoderma subrotundatum Reitter, 1881
- Trogoderma subtile Reitter, 1881
- Trogoderma tasmanicum Armstrong, 1942
- Trogoderma tenuefasciatum Reitter, 1881
- Trogoderma teukton Beal, 1956
- Trogoderma thoracicum Reitter, 1881
- Trogoderma tolarnense Blackburn, 1903
- Trogoderma unifasciatum Pic, 1942
- Trogoderma variabile Ballion, 1878
- Trogoderma variegatum (Solier, 1849)
- Trogoderma varipes Blackburn, 1892
- Trogoderma varium Matsumura & Yokoyama, 1928
- Trogoderma versicolor (Creutzer, 1799)
- Trogoderma vicinum Dejean, 1837
- Trogoderma villosum Dejean, 1821
- Trogoderma vulneratum Fauvel, 1903
- Trogoderma westerduijni Háva & Herrmann, 2007
- Trogoderma whitei Armstrong, 1942
- Trogoderma yorkense Blackburn, 1891
- Trogoderma yunnaeunse Zhang & Liu, 1986
