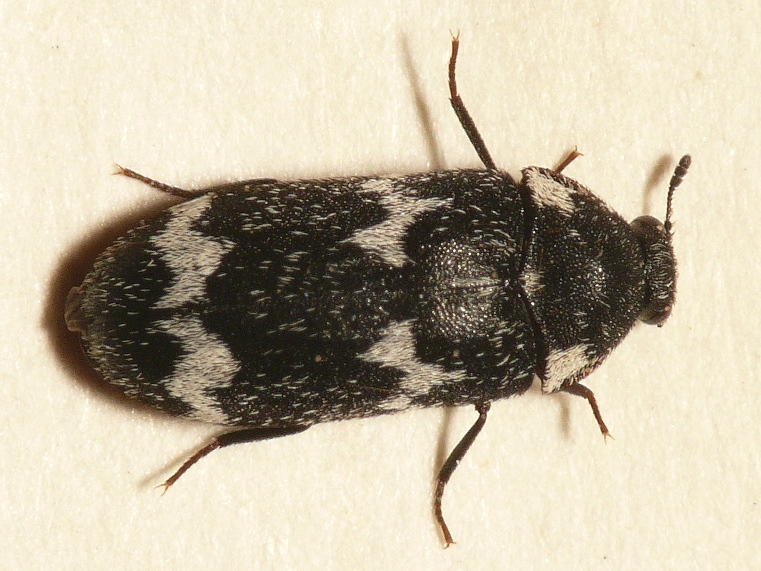
- Megatoma undata

Scientific classification
- Domain: Eukaryota
- Kingdom: Animalia
- Phylum: Arthropoda
- Class: Insecta
- Order: Coleoptera
- Suborder: Polyphaga
- Family: Dermestidae
- Subfamily: Megatominae; Leach, 1815

Synonyms
- Anthreninae Gistel, 1856

= Megatominae =

Subfamily of beetles

Megatominae is a subfamily of the beetle family Dermestidae. This subfamily contains several of the most well-known household and stored-product pest beetles, in the genera Anthrenus and Trogoderma.

== Taxonomy ==
According to World Dermestidae catalogue (Jiří Háva, 2023), following taxonomic division is proposed for Megatominae:

- Dermestidae
  - Megatominae
    - Anthrenini
    - Megatomini
    - Ctesiini
  - Dermestinae
  - Thorictinae
  - Orphilinae
  - Trinodinae
  - Attageninae
  - Trogoparvinae

== Genera ==
The genera listed below currently belong to subfamily Megatominae (subtribes omitted)

Anthrenini:

- Anthrenus Geoffroy, 1762
- Dermeanthrenus Háva, 2008

Ctesiini:

- Ctesias Stephens, 1830

Megatomini:

- †Amberoderma Háva & Prokop, 2004
- Anthrenocerus Arrow, 1915
- Claviella Kalík, 1987
- Caccoleptoides Herrmann, Háva & Kadej, 2015
- Caccoleptus Sharp, 1902
- †Cretomegatoma Háva, 2021
- Cryptorhopalum Guérin-Méneville, 1838
- Dearthrus LeConte, 1861
- Globicornis Latreille in Cuvier, 1829
- Hemirhopalum Sharp, 1902
- Hirtomegatoma Pic, 1931
- Labrocerus Sharp in Blackburn & Sharp, 1885
- Megatoma Herbst, 1792
- †Miocryptorhopalum Pierce, 1960
- Myrmeanthrenus Armstrong, 1945
- Orbeola Mulsant & Rey, 1868
- Orphinus Motschulsky, 1858
- Paratrogoderma Scott, 1926
- Phradonoma Jacquelin du Val, 1859
- Pecticaccoleptus Háva, 2004
- Reesa Beal, 1967
- Sodaliatoma Háva, 2013
- Socotracornis Háva, 2013
- Thaumaglossa Redtenbacher, 1867
- Trogoderma Dejean, 1821
- Turcicornis Háva, 2000
- †Tuberphradonoma Háva, 2021
- Valdesetosum Háva, 2015
- Zahradnikia Háva, 2013
- Zhantievus Beal, 1992
