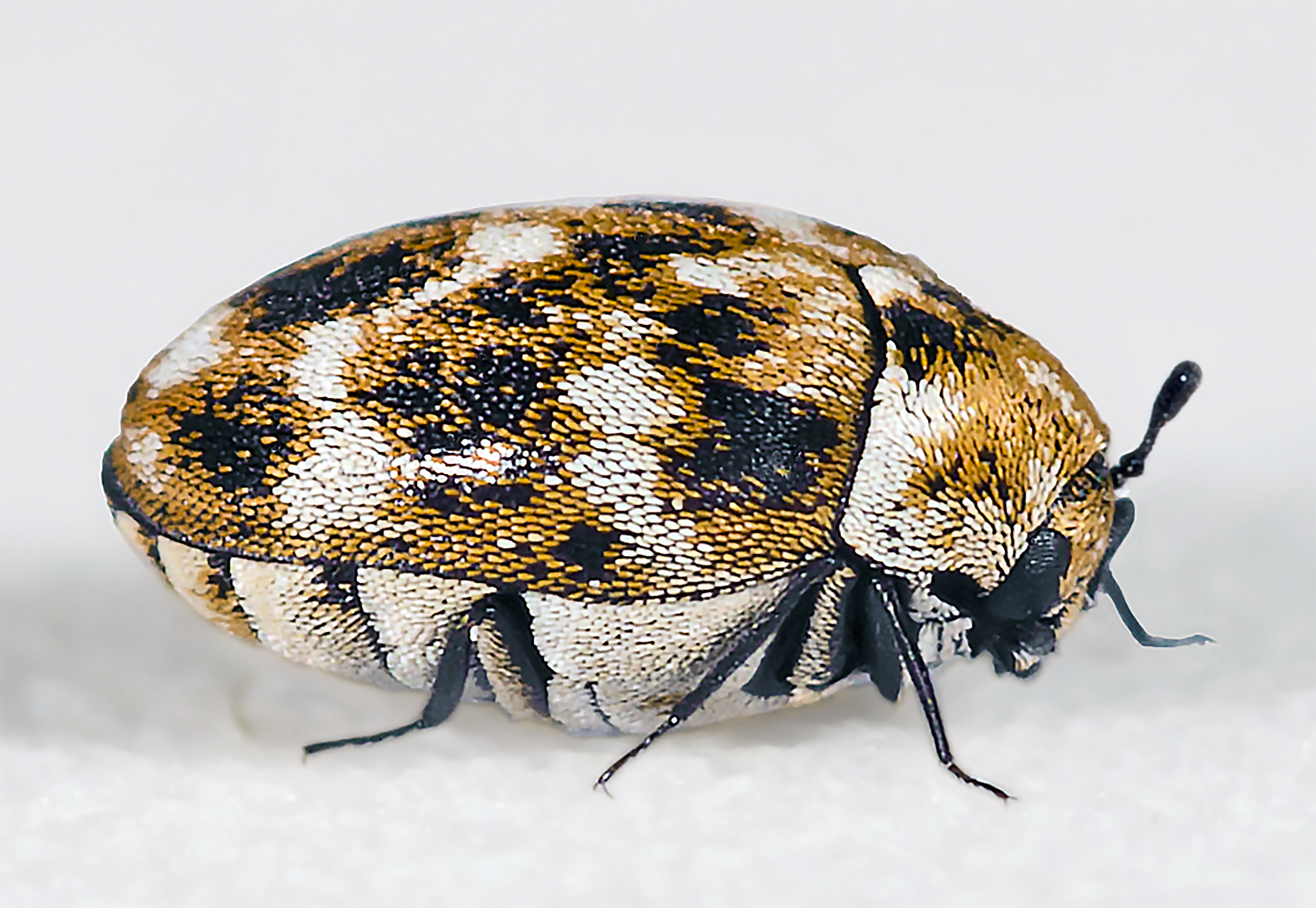

Scientific classification
- Kingdom: Animalia
- Phylum: Arthropoda
- Clade: Pancrustacea
- Class: Insecta
- Order: Coleoptera
- Suborder: Polyphaga
- Family: Dermestidae
- Subfamily: Megatominae
- Tribe: Anthrenini

= Anthrenini =

Tribe of beetles

Anthrenini is a tribe of beetles in the family Dermestidae. There are at least 100 described species in Anthrenini.

== Taxonomy ==
According to World Dermestidae catalogue (Jiří Háva, 2023), following taxonomic division is proposed for the tribe Anthrenini:

- Dermestidae
  - Megatominae
    - Anthrenini
      - Anthrenina
        - Anthrenus
          - Anthrenodes
          - Anthrenops
          - Anthrenus s. str.
          - Florilinus
          - Helocerus
          - Nathrenus
          - Peacockia
          - Ranthenus
          - Setapeacockia
          - Solskinus
      - Dermeanthrenina
        - Dermeanthrenus
    - Megatomini
    - Ctesiini
  - other Dermestidae subfamilies

== Genera ==
- Anthrenus Geoffroy, 1762
- Dermeanthrenus Háva, 2008 (monotypic)
