= Cryptorhopalum apicale =

Scientific classification
- Domain: Eukaryota
- Kingdom: Animalia
- Phylum: Arthropoda
- Class: Insecta
- Order: Coleoptera
- Suborder: Polyphaga
- Family: Dermestidae
- Subtribe: Cryptorhopalina
- Genus: Cryptorhopalum
- Species: C. apicale

Binomial name
- Cryptorhopalum apicale (Mannerheim, 1843)

Species of beetle

Cryptorhopalum apicale is a species of carpet beetle in the family Dermestidae. It is found in North America.
