= Cryptorhopalum haemorrhoidale =

Scientific classification
- Kingdom: Animalia
- Phylum: Arthropoda
- Clade: Pancrustacea
- Class: Insecta
- Order: Coleoptera
- Suborder: Polyphaga
- Family: Dermestidae
- Subtribe: Cryptorhopalina
- Genus: Cryptorhopalum
- Species: C. haemorrhoidale

Binomial name
- Cryptorhopalum haemorrhoidale (J. E. LeConte, 1824)

Species of beetle

Cryptorhopalum haemorrhoidale is a species of carpet beetle in the family Dermestidae. It is found in North America.
