= Cryptorhopalum pruddeni =

Scientific classification
- Kingdom: Animalia
- Phylum: Arthropoda
- Class: Insecta
- Order: Coleoptera
- Suborder: Polyphaga
- Family: Dermestidae
- Subtribe: Cryptorhopalina
- Genus: Cryptorhopalum
- Species: C. pruddeni

Binomial name
- Cryptorhopalum pruddeni Casey, 1900

Species of beetle

Cryptorhopalum pruddeni is a species of carpet beetle in the family Dermestidae. It is found in North America.
