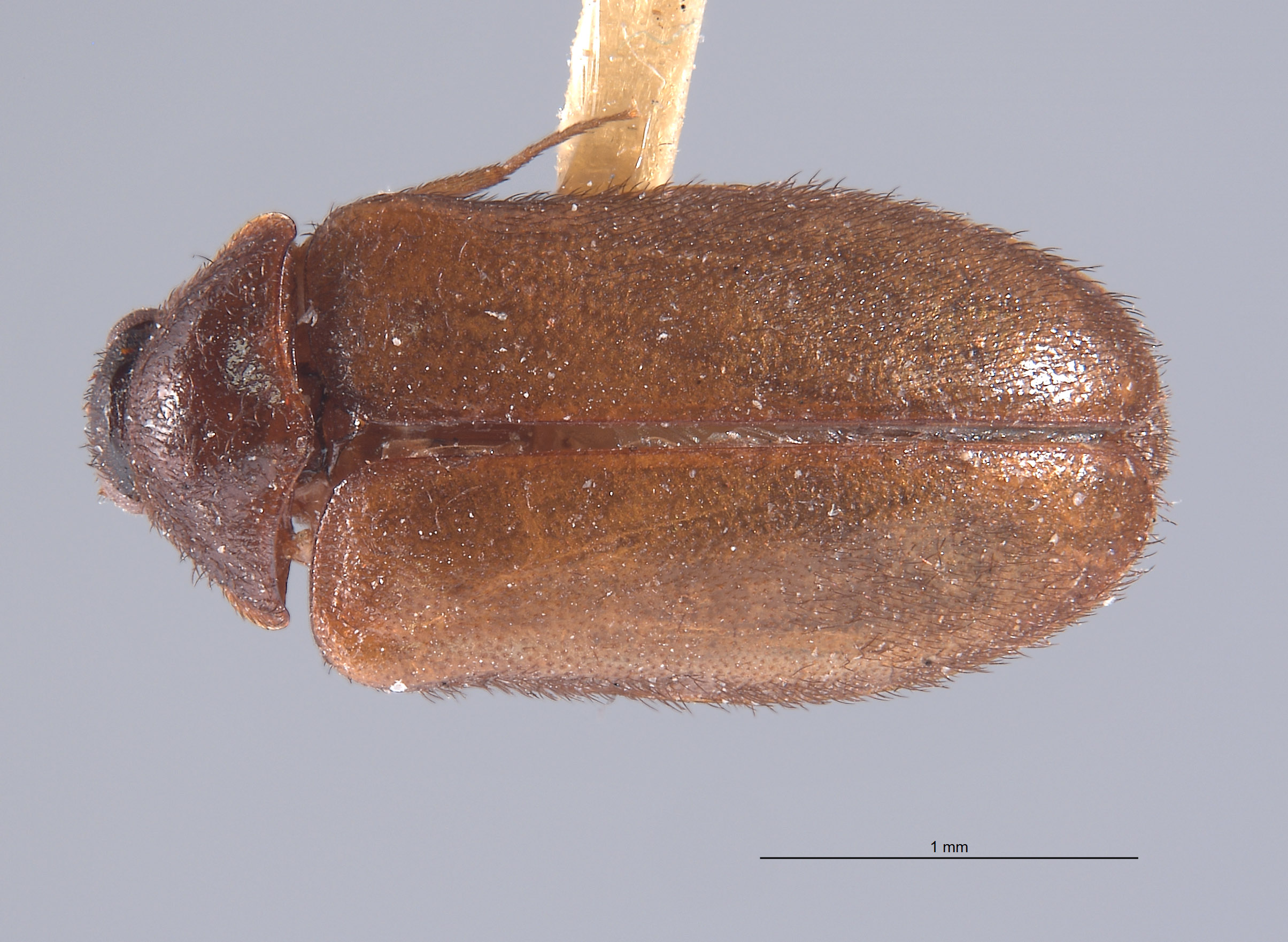
- Dorsal image
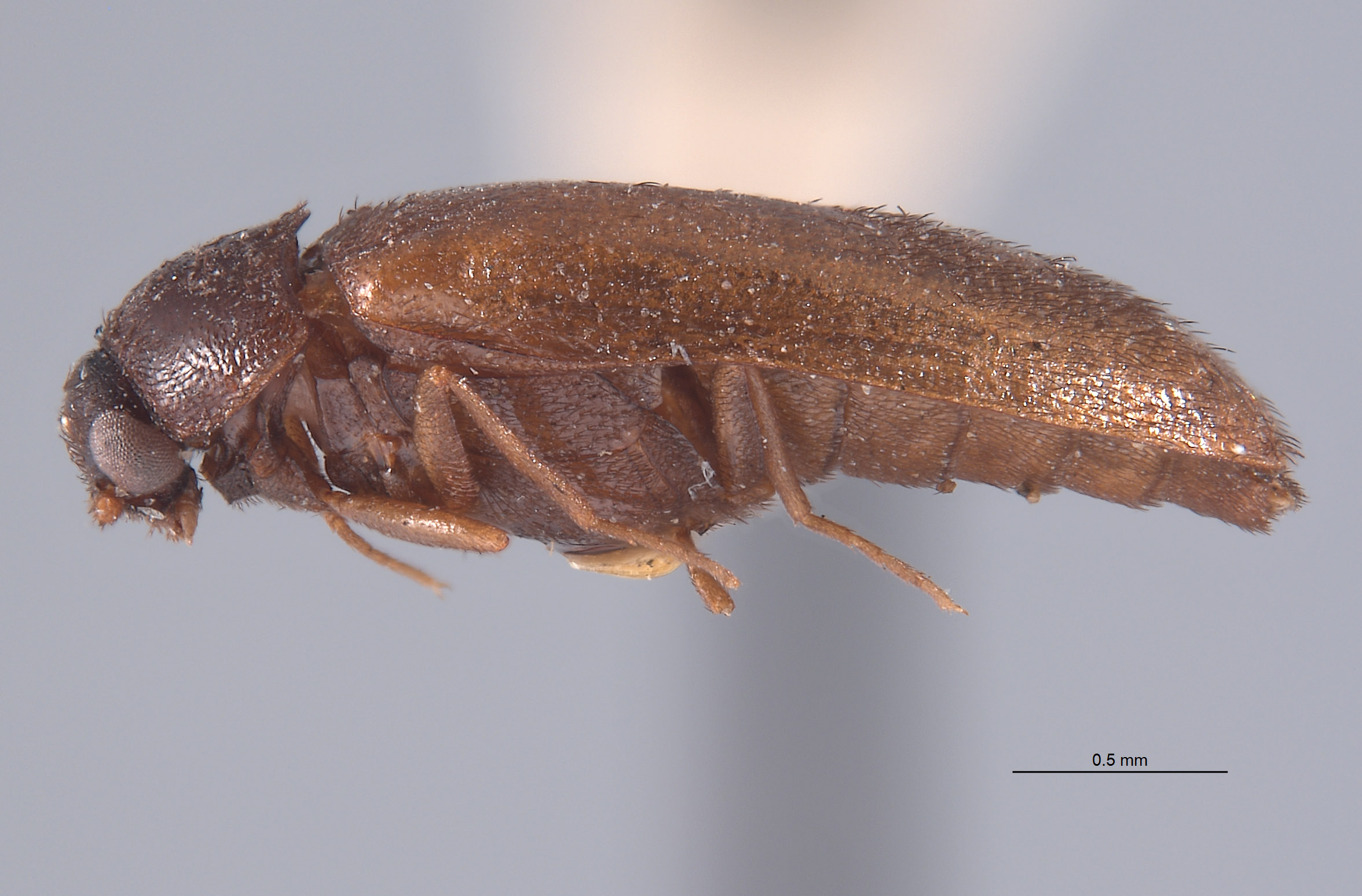
- Lateral image

Scientific classification
- Domain: Eukaryota
- Kingdom: Animalia
- Phylum: Arthropoda
- Class: Insecta
- Order: Coleoptera
- Suborder: Polyphaga
- Family: Dermestidae
- Genus: Ctesias
- Species: C. dusmae

Binomial name
- Ctesias dusmae Beal, 1960

= Ctesias dusmae =

Species of beetle

Ctesias dusmae is a species of carpet beetle in the family Dermestidae. It is found in North America.

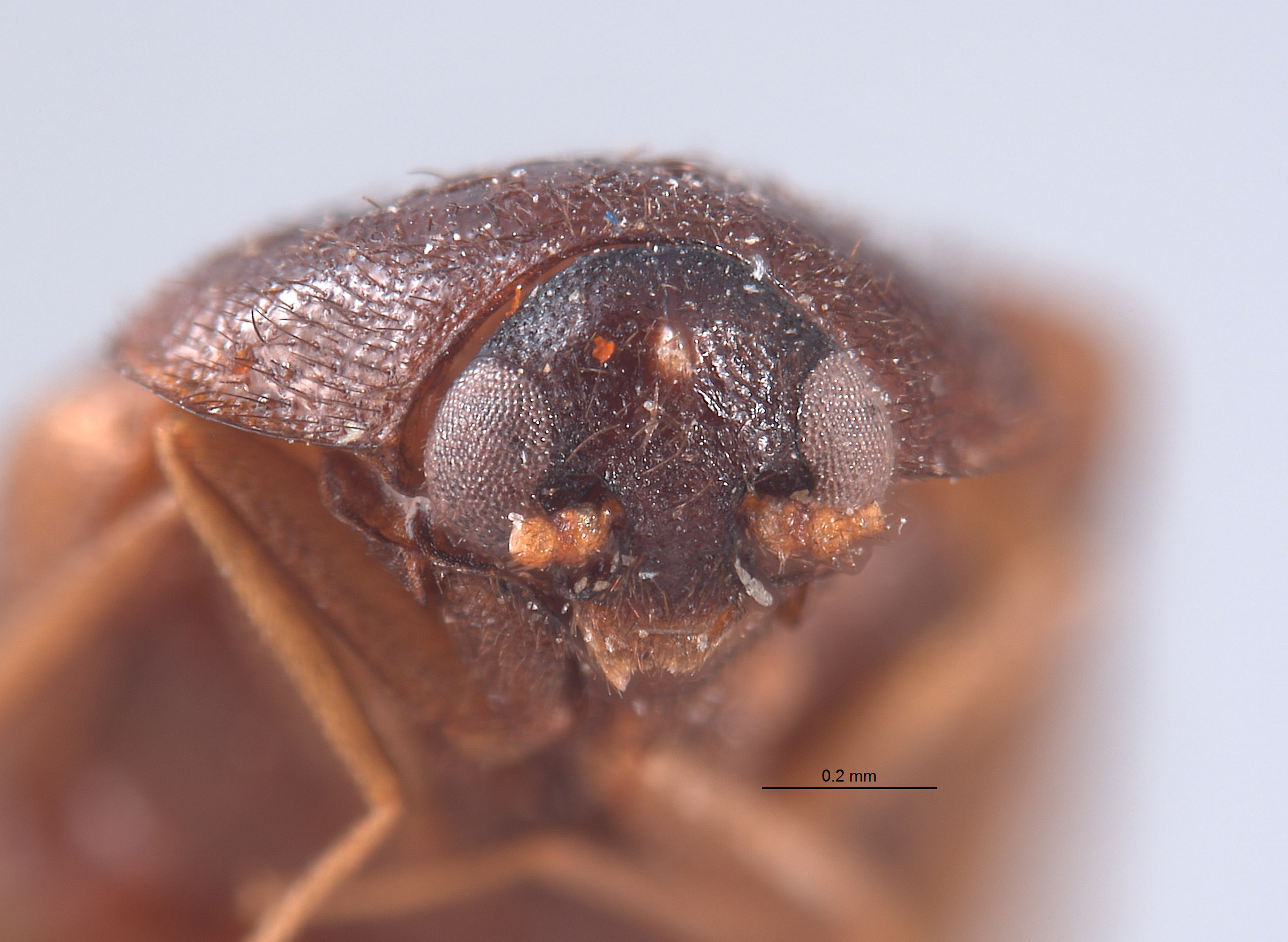
Adult Ctesias dusmae. Head view

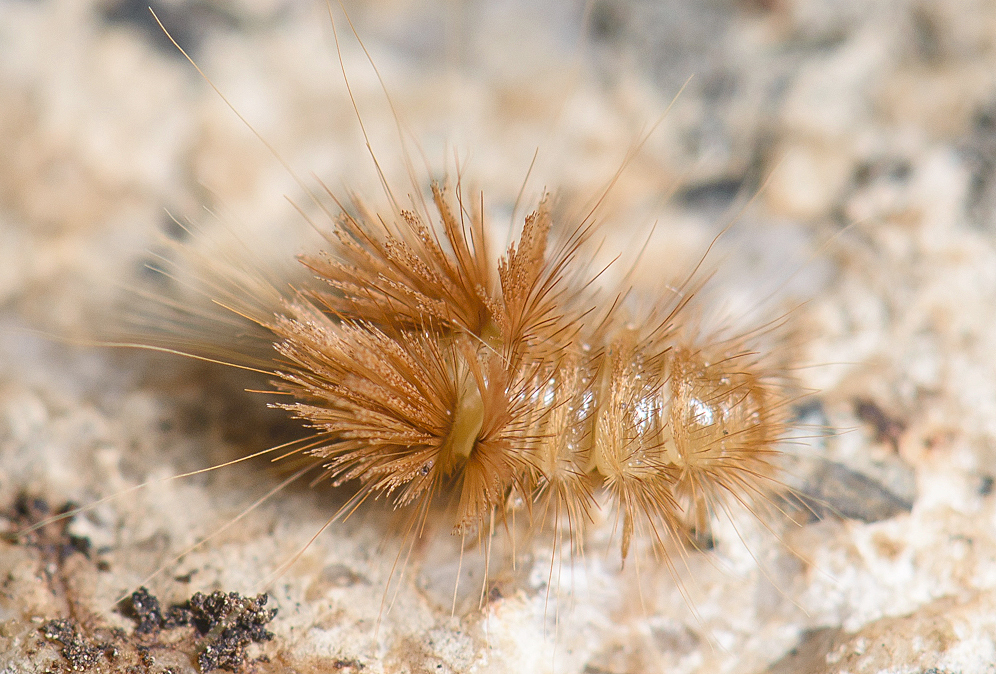
Larva of Ctesias dusmae

== See also ==
- Ctesias serra - Ctesias species from Europe
