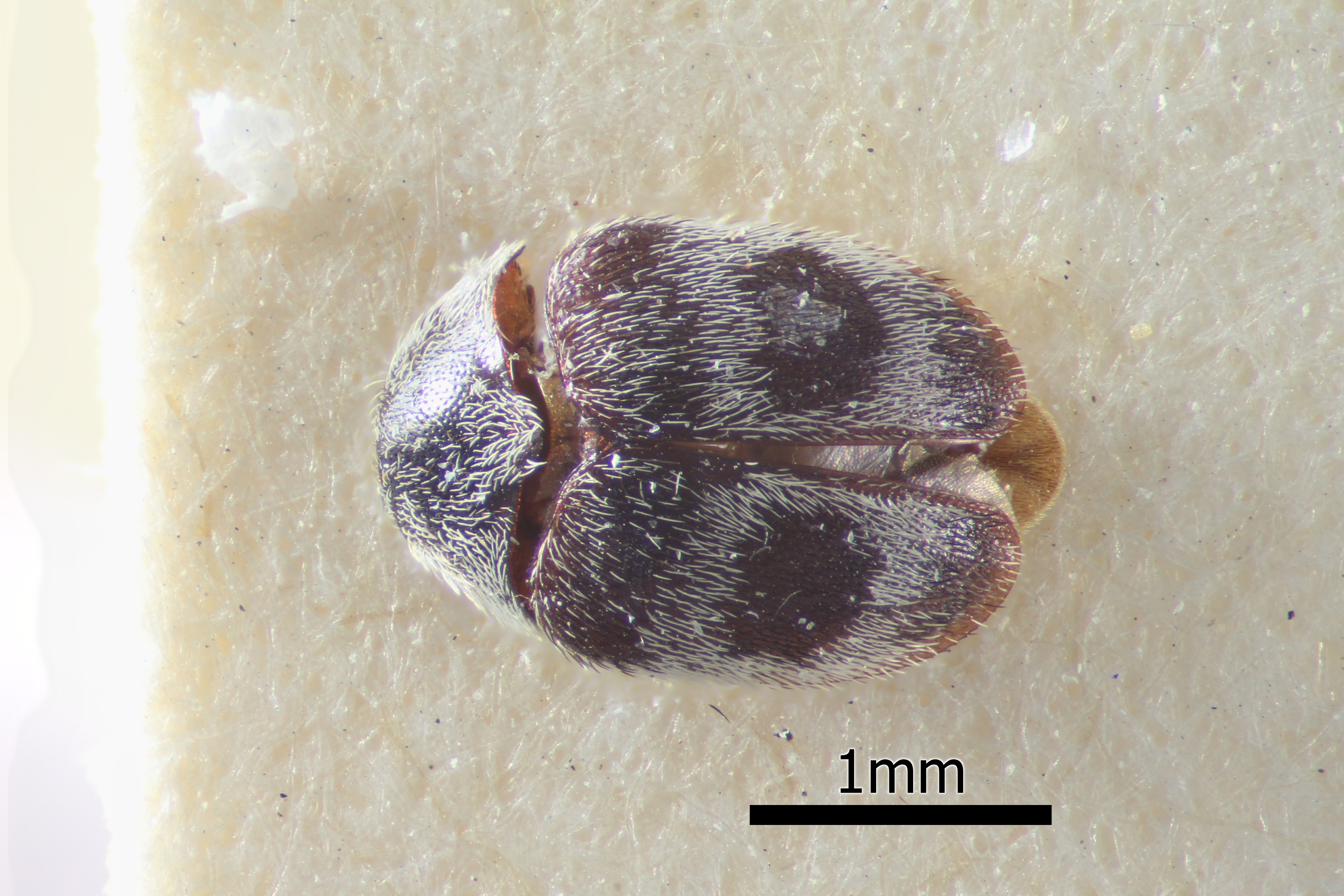
- Specimen at the Natural History Museum, London, UK

Scientific classification
- Kingdom: Animalia
- Phylum: Arthropoda
- Class: Insecta
- Order: Coleoptera
- Suborder: Polyphaga
- Family: Dermestidae
- Genus: Thaumaglossa
- Species: T. pici

Binomial name
- Thaumaglossa pici Háva, 2008

= Thaumaglossa pici =

Species of beetle

Thaumaglossa pici, is a species of skin beetle found in Sri Lanka.

== Description ==
Total length of female is about 2.70 to 2.80 mm.
