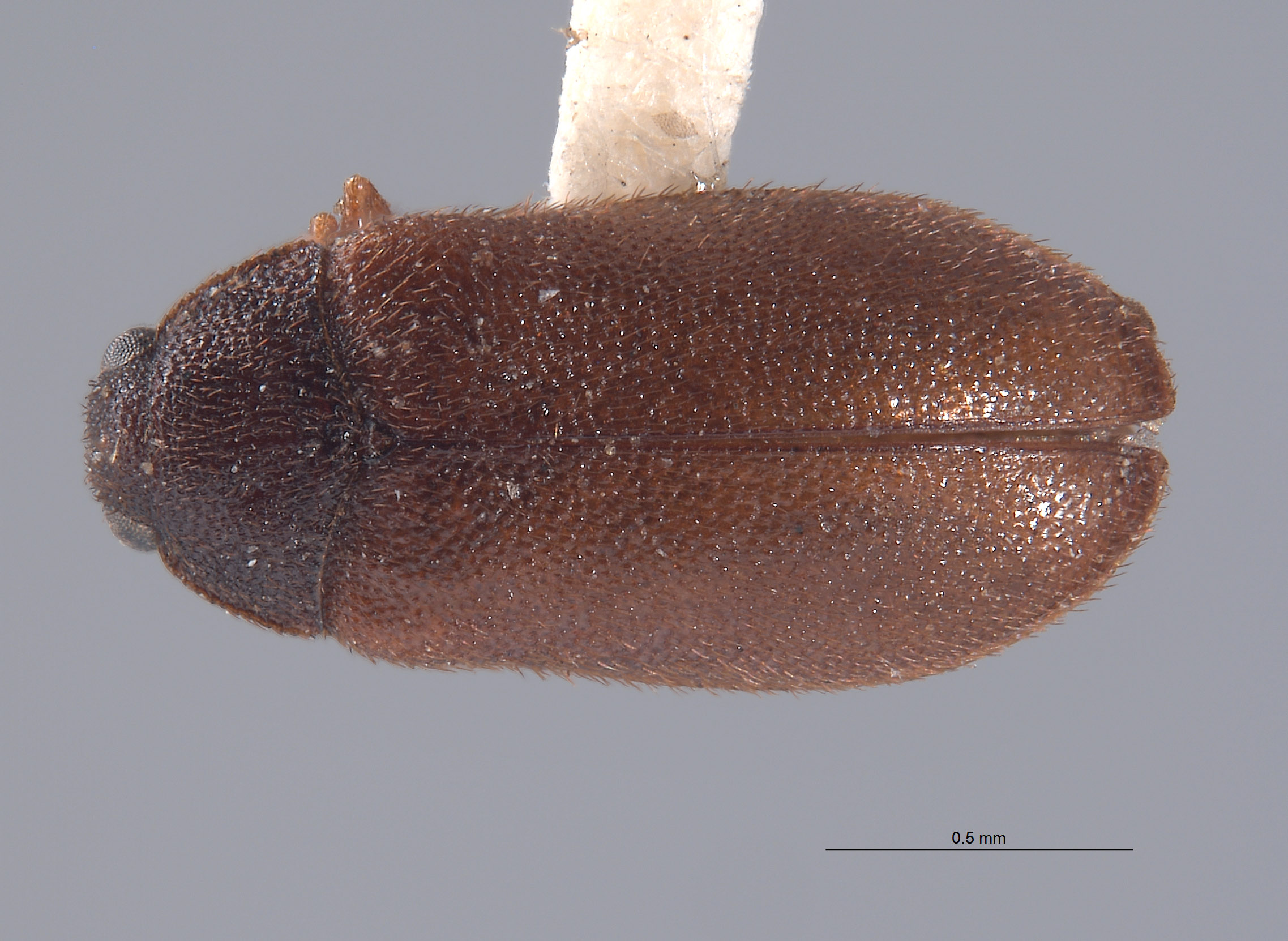
- Dorsal image
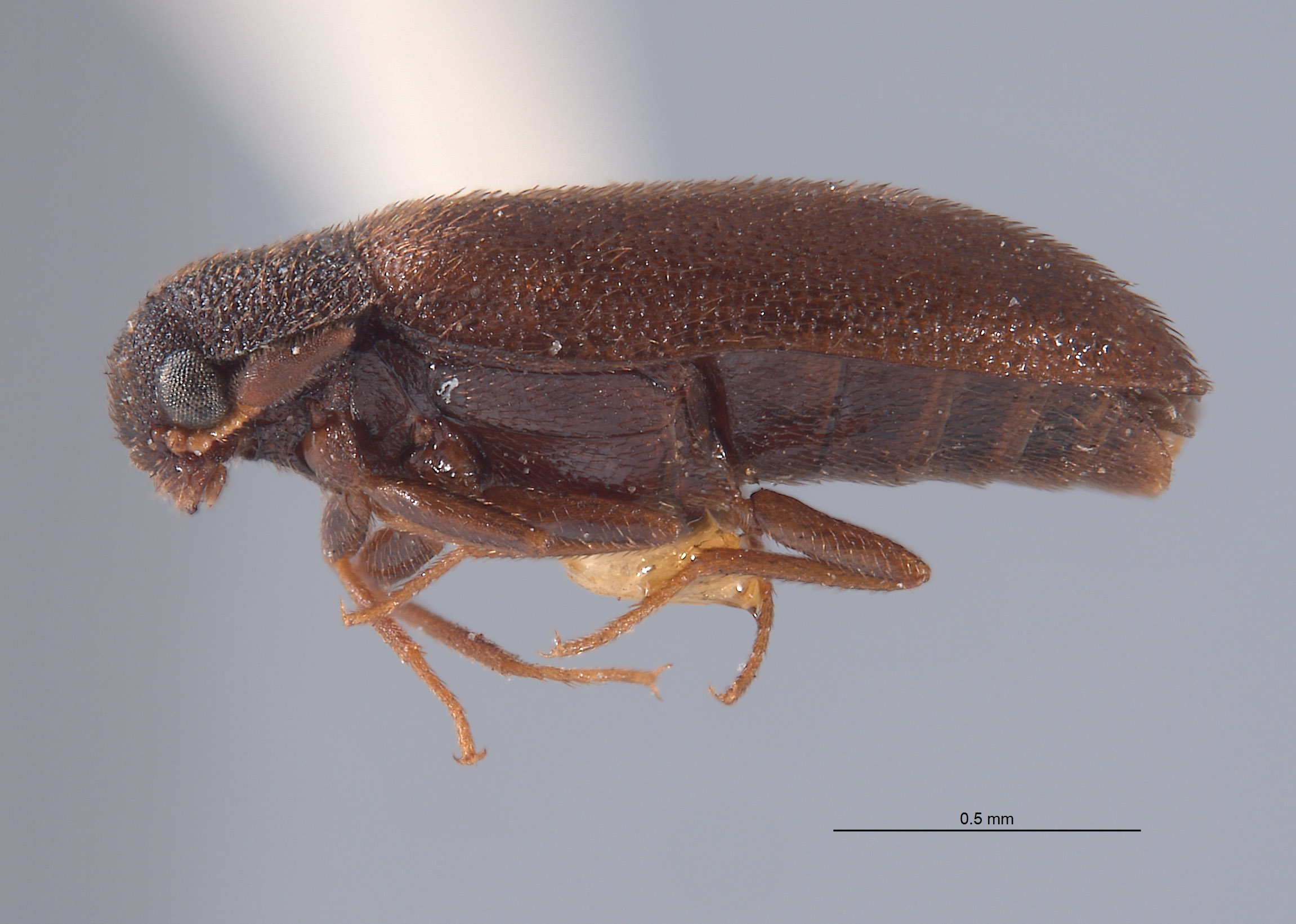
- Lateral image

Scientific classification
- Domain: Eukaryota
- Kingdom: Animalia
- Phylum: Arthropoda
- Class: Insecta
- Order: Coleoptera
- Suborder: Polyphaga
- Family: Dermestidae
- Tribe: Megatomini
- Subtribe: Megatomina
- Genus: Dearthrus
- Species: D. stebbinsi

Binomial name
- Dearthrus stebbinsi Beal, 1954

= Dearthrus stebbinsi =

Species of beetle

Dearthrus stebbinsi is a species of carpet beetle in the family Dermestidae. It is found in North America.

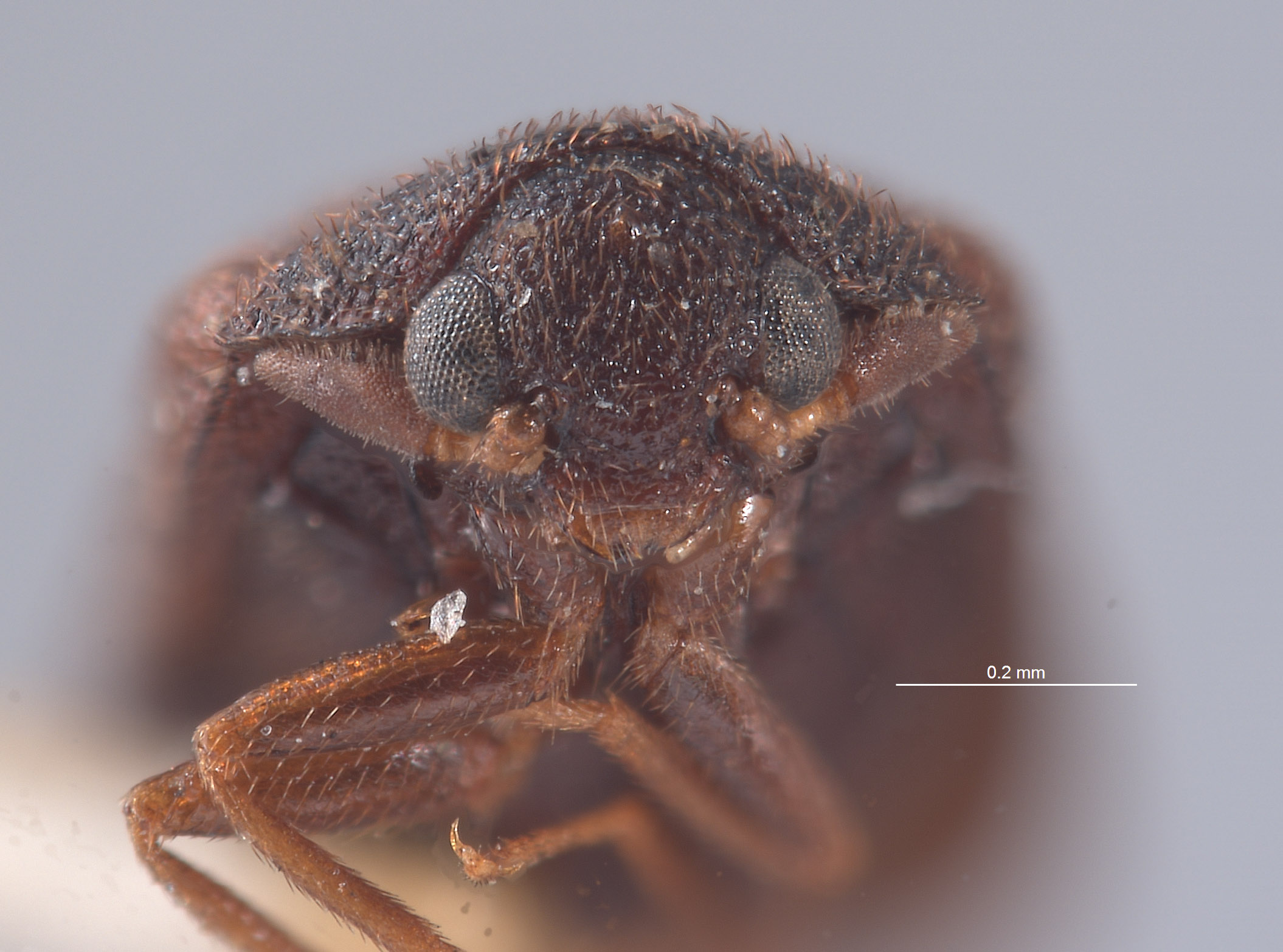
Adult Dearthrus stebbinsi. Head view
