= Thaumaglossa americana =

Scientific classification
- Domain: Eukaryota
- Kingdom: Animalia
- Phylum: Arthropoda
- Class: Insecta
- Order: Coleoptera
- Suborder: Polyphaga
- Family: Dermestidae
- Subtribe: Orphinina
- Genus: Thaumaglossa
- Species: T. americana

Binomial name
- Thaumaglossa americana (Jayne, 1882)

Species of beetle

Thaumaglossa americana is a species of carpet beetle in the family Dermestidae. It is found in North America.
