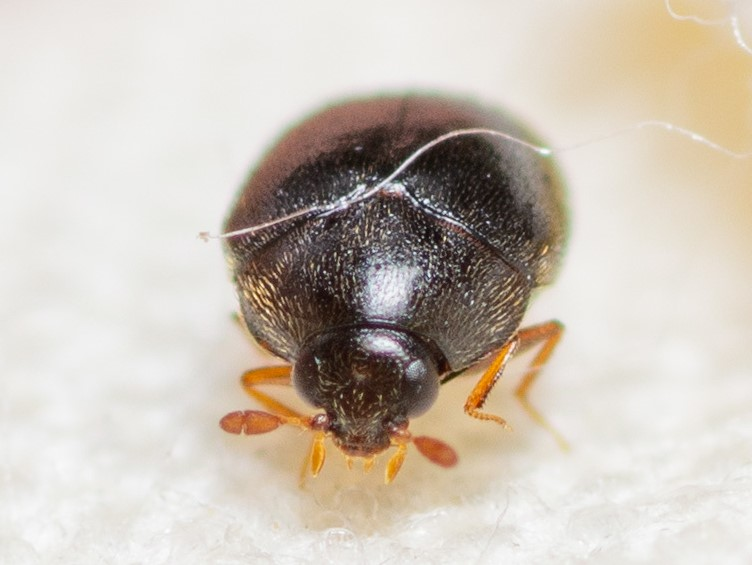

Scientific classification
- Domain: Eukaryota
- Kingdom: Animalia
- Phylum: Arthropoda
- Class: Insecta
- Order: Coleoptera
- Suborder: Polyphaga
- Family: Dermestidae
- Subtribe: Cryptorhopalina
- Genus: Cryptorhopalum
- Species: C. ruficorne

Binomial name
- Cryptorhopalum ruficorne LeConte, 1854

= Cryptorhopalum ruficorne =

Species of beetle

Cryptorhopalum ruficorne is a species of carpet beetle in the family Dermestidae. It is found in North America.
