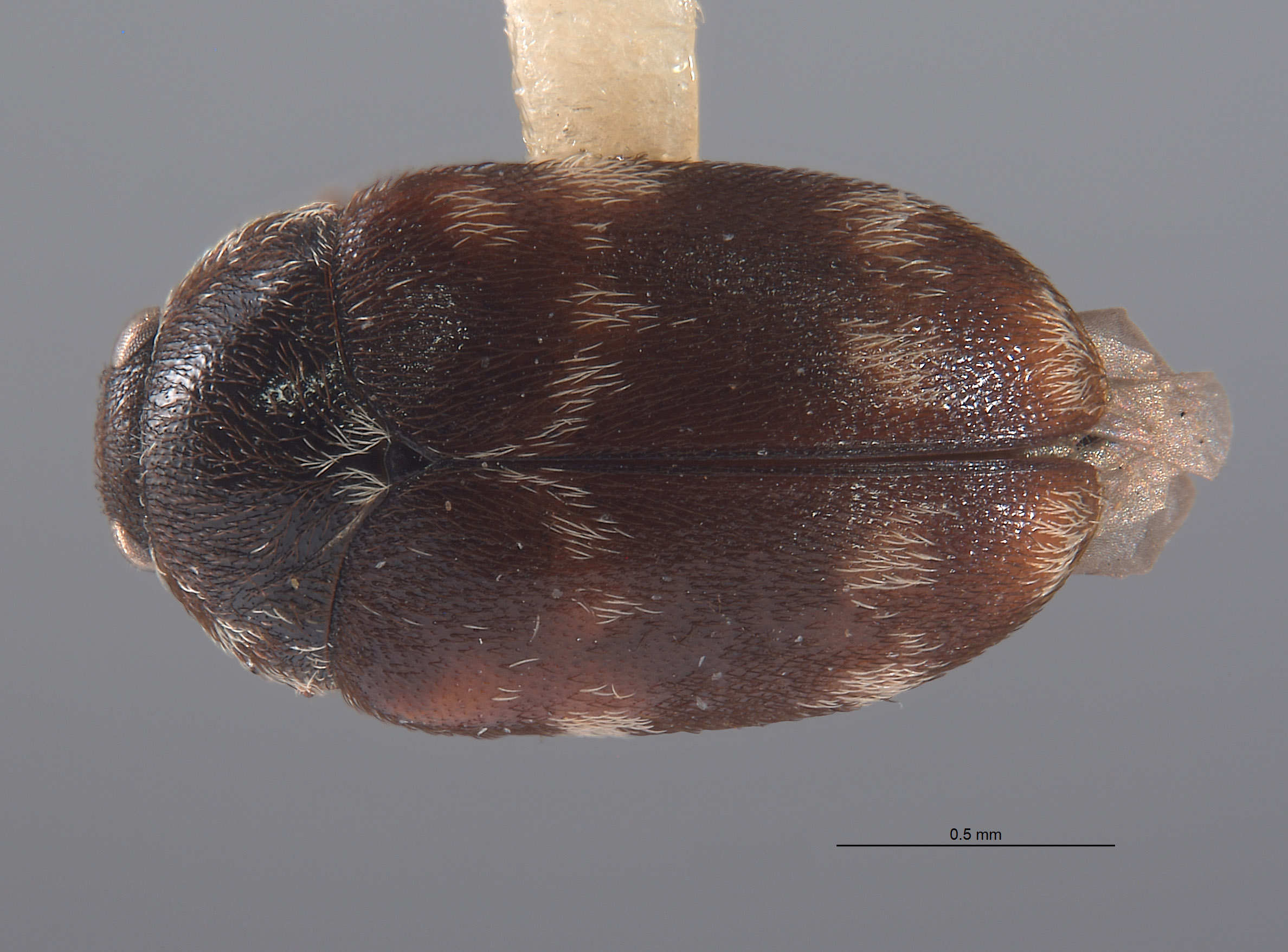
- Dorsal image
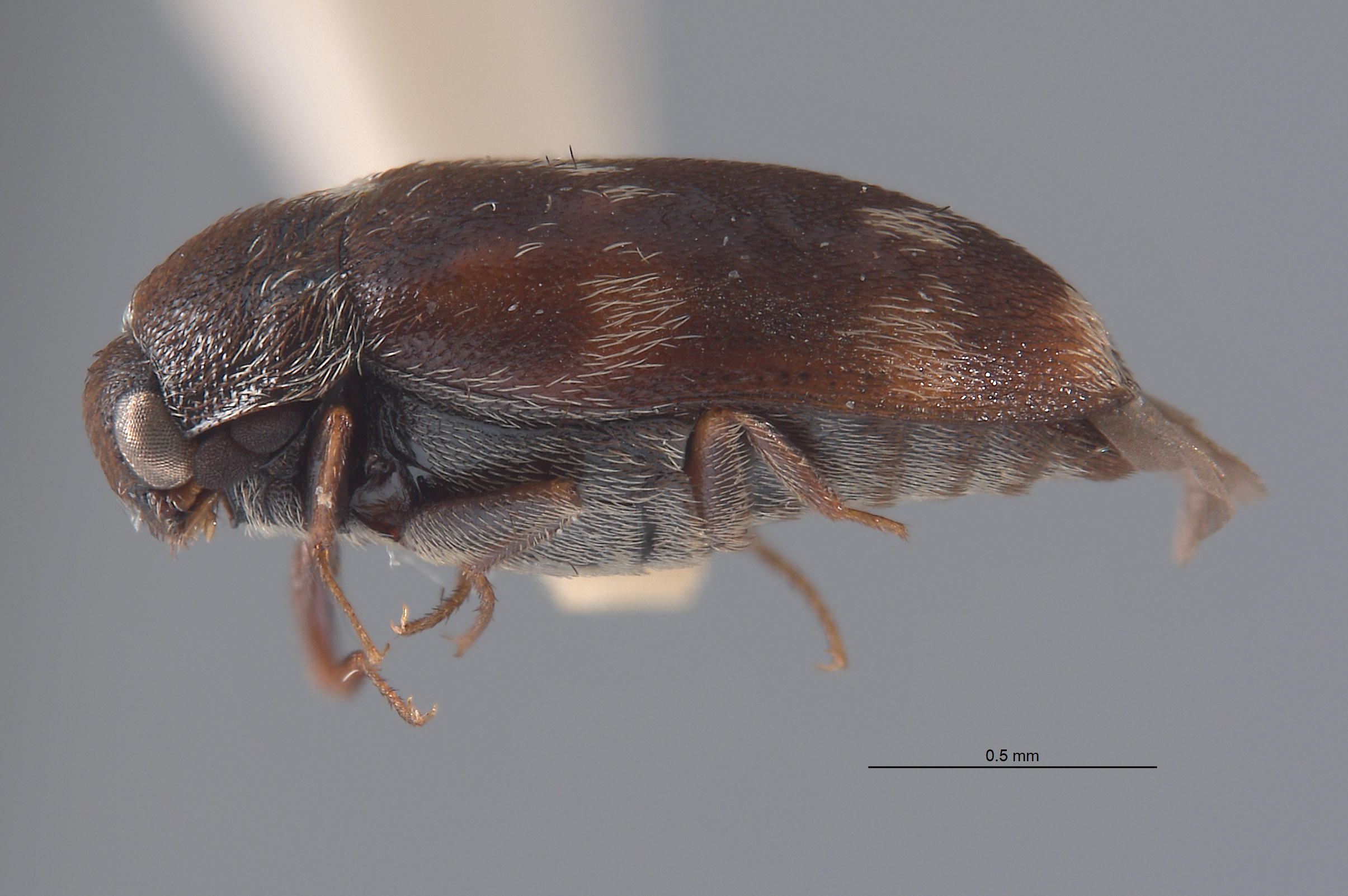
- Lateral image

Scientific classification
- Domain: Eukaryota
- Kingdom: Animalia
- Phylum: Arthropoda
- Class: Insecta
- Order: Coleoptera
- Suborder: Polyphaga
- Family: Dermestidae
- Genus: Cryptorhopalum
- Species: C. poorei

Binomial name
- Cryptorhopalum poorei Beal, 1975

= Cryptorhopalum poorei =

Species of beetle

Cryptorhopalum poorei is a species of beetle in the family Dermestidae that is known from Mexico (Durango) and the United States (Arizona).

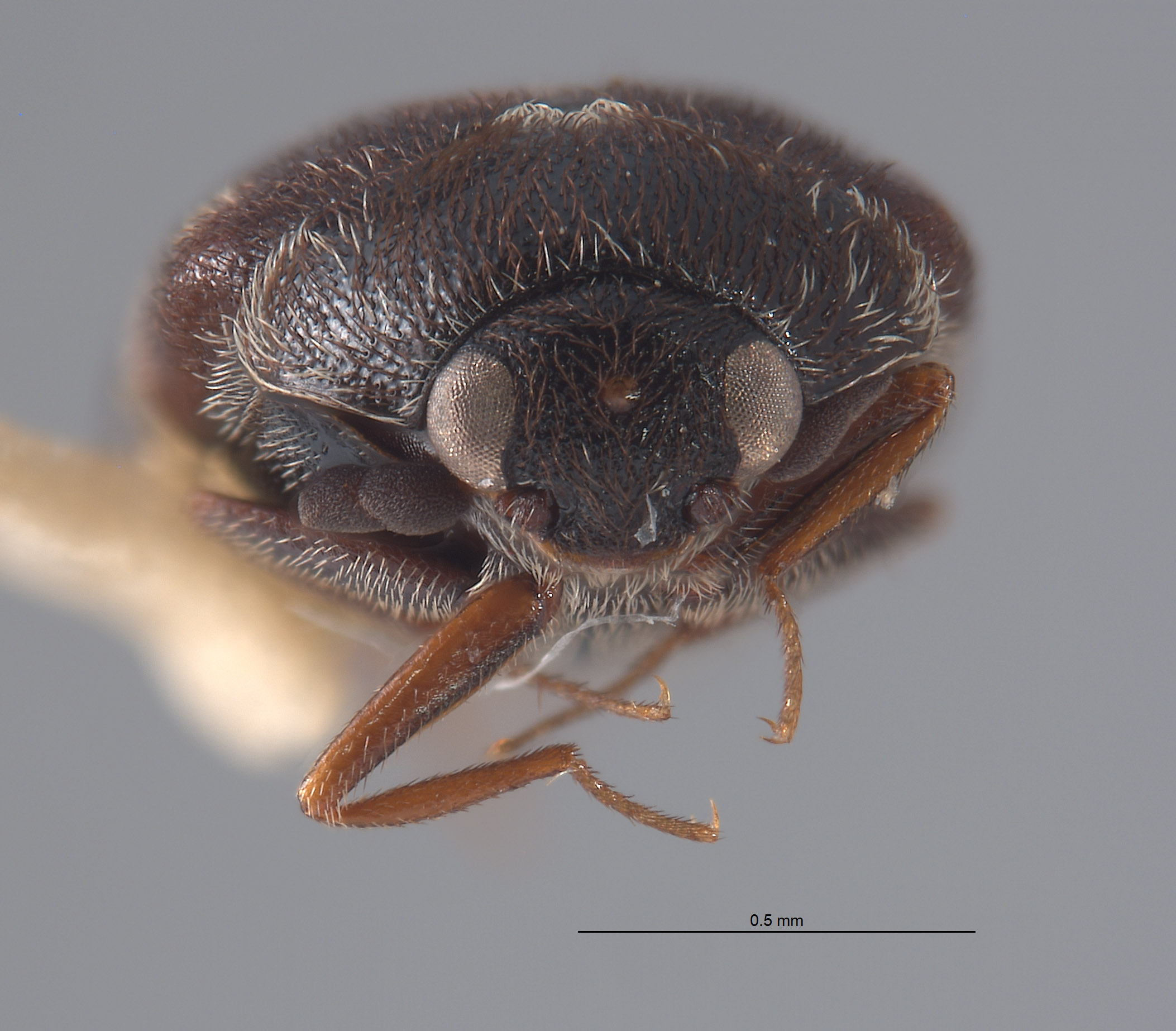
Adult Cryptorhopalum poorei. Head view

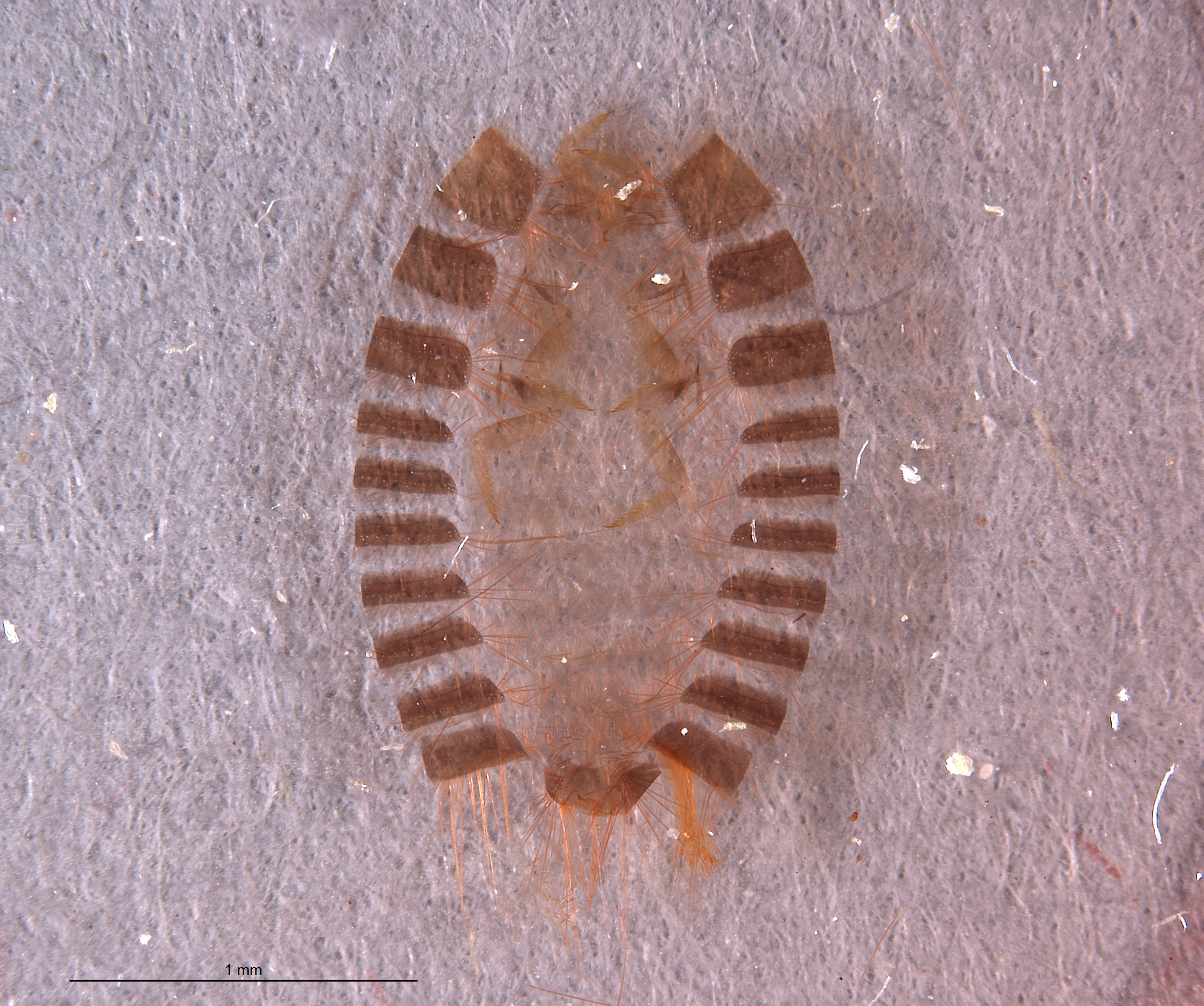
Cryptorhopalum poorei. Larval skin
