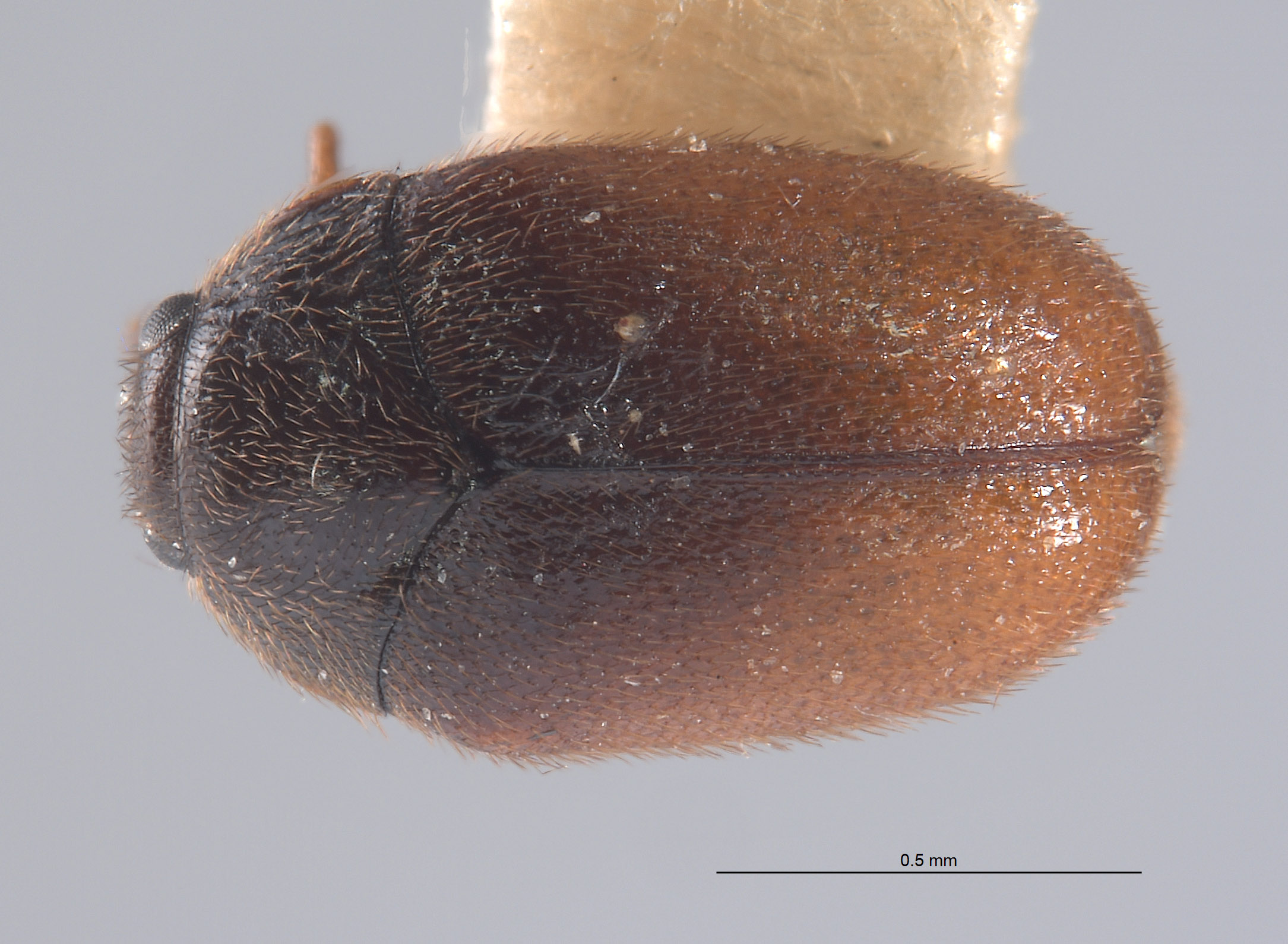
- Dorsal image
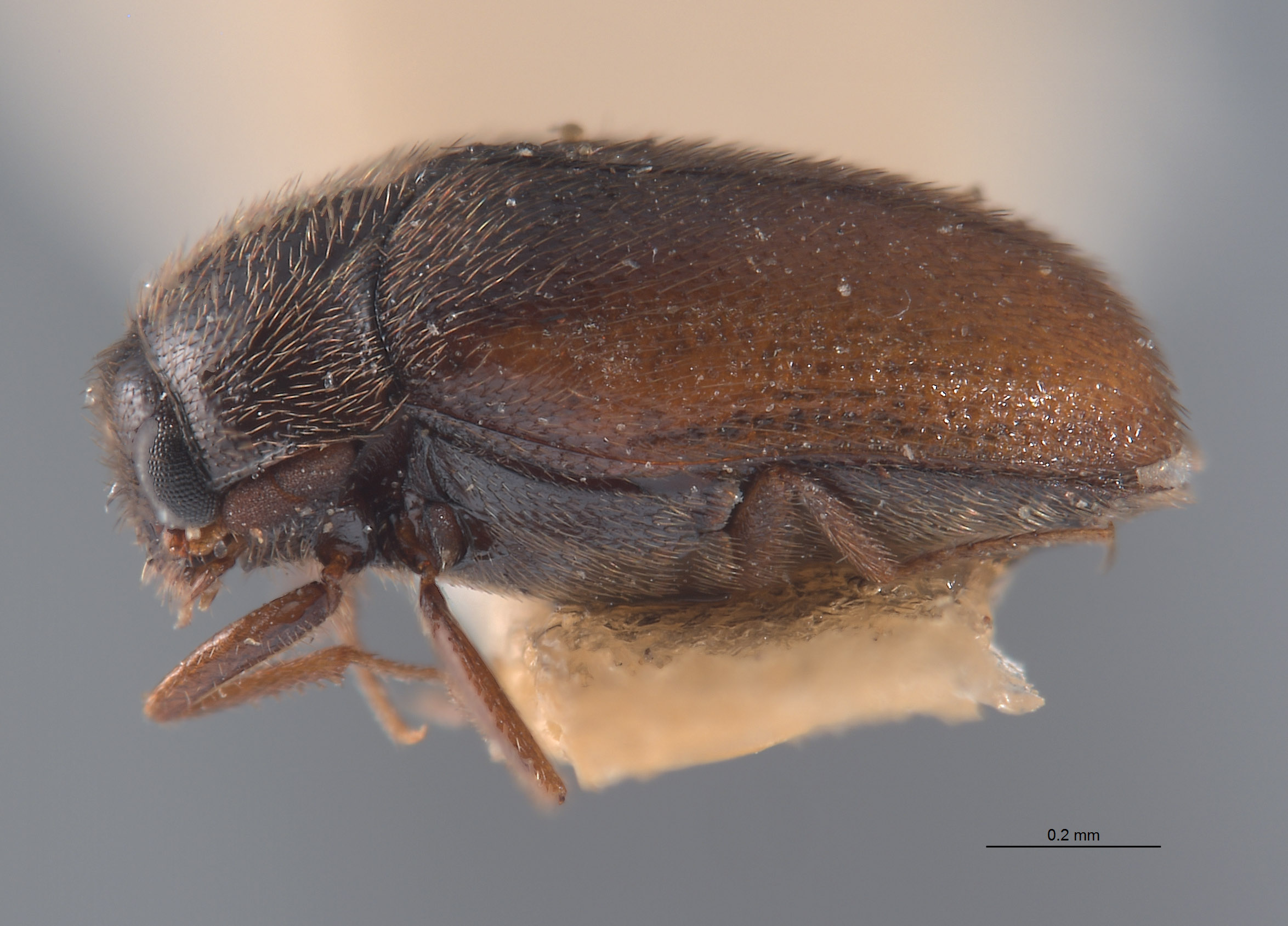
- Lateral image

Scientific classification
- Domain: Eukaryota
- Kingdom: Animalia
- Phylum: Arthropoda
- Class: Insecta
- Order: Coleoptera
- Suborder: Polyphaga
- Family: Dermestidae
- Genus: Cryptorhopalum
- Species: C. rubidum

Binomial name
- Cryptorhopalum rubidum Beal, 1979

= Cryptorhopalum rubidum =

Species of beetle

Cryptorhopalum rubidum is a species of beetle in the family Dermestidae that is known from the United States (Arizona, California).

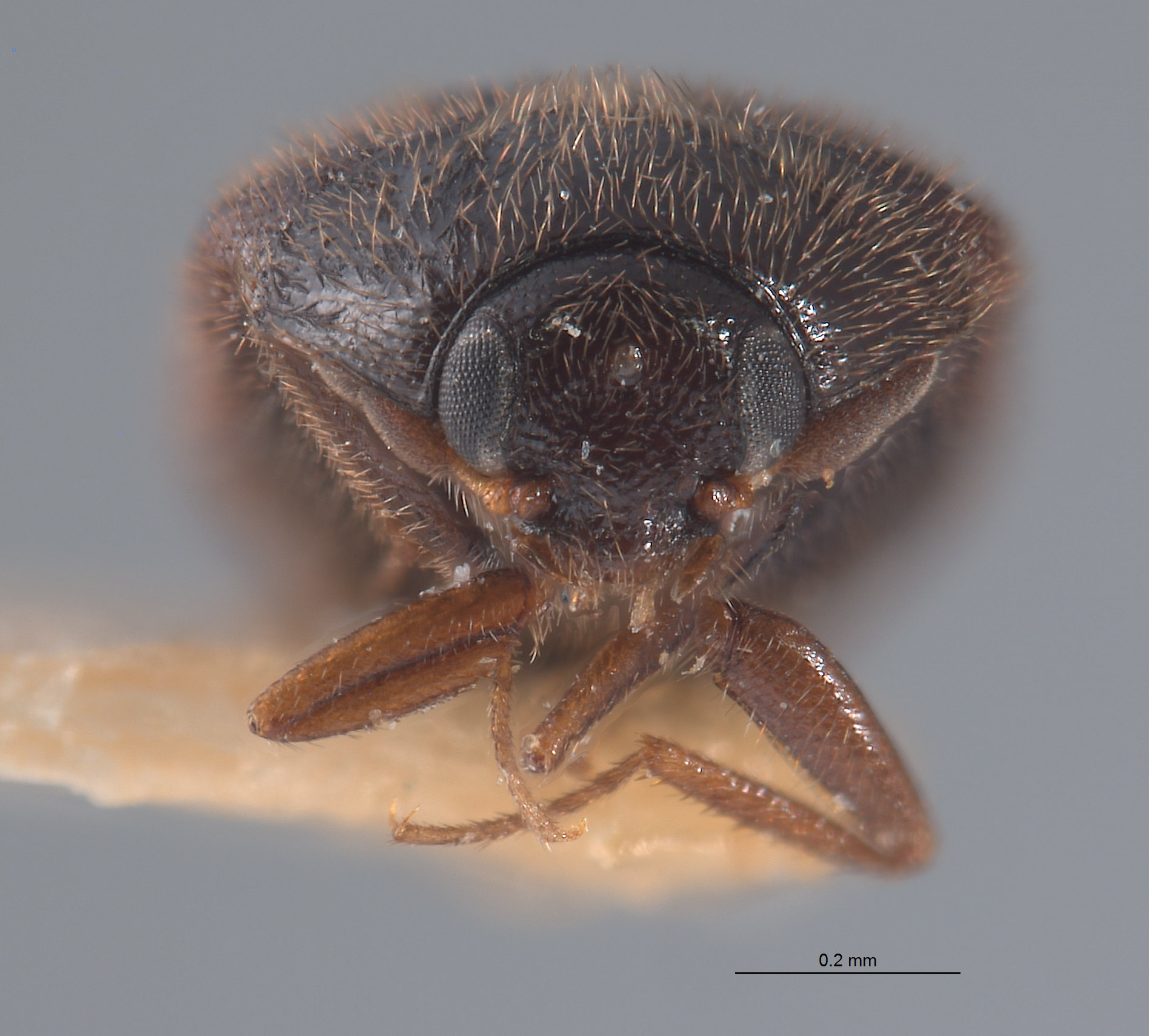
Adult Cryptorhopalum rubidum. Head view
