= Anthrenus mendax =

Scientific classification
- Kingdom: Animalia
- Phylum: Arthropoda
- Class: Insecta
- Order: Coleoptera
- Suborder: Polyphaga
- Family: Dermestidae
- Genus: Anthrenus
- Subgenus: Setapeacockia
- Species: A. mendax

Binomial name
- Anthrenus mendax Háva, 2006

Species of beetle

Anthrenus (Setapeacockia) mendax is a species of carpet beetle found in Iran.
