= Cryptorhopalum triste =

Scientific classification
- Domain: Eukaryota
- Kingdom: Animalia
- Phylum: Arthropoda
- Class: Insecta
- Order: Coleoptera
- Suborder: Polyphaga
- Family: Dermestidae
- Genus: Cryptorhopalum
- Species: C. triste

Binomial name
- Cryptorhopalum triste LeConte, 1854

Species of beetle

Cryptorhopalum triste is a species of carpet beetle in the family Dermestidae. It is found in North America. The species is polyphagous, feeding on plants from over 16 families.
