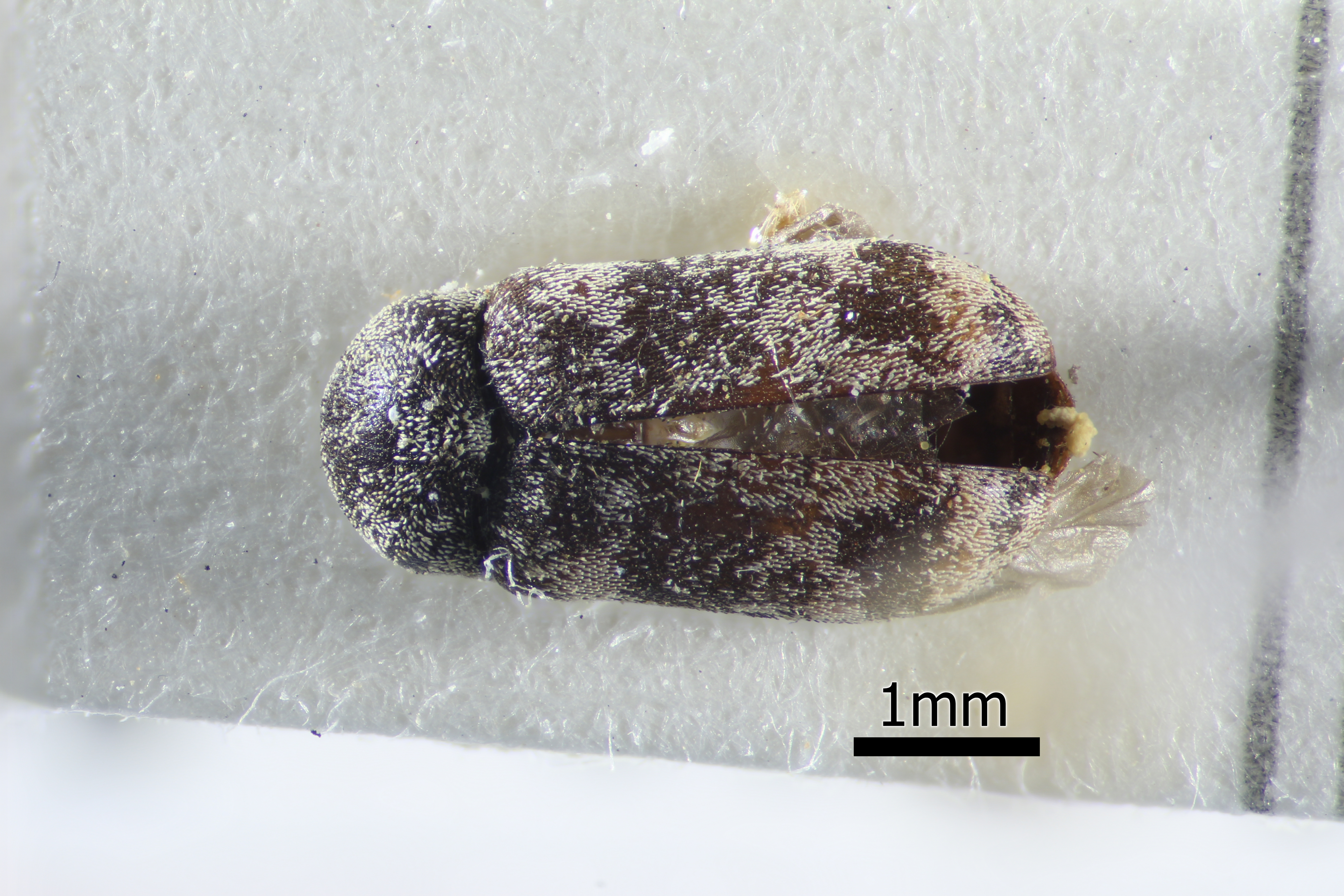
- Anthrenus vladimiri, the only known species of the subgenus

Scientific classification
- Domain: Eukaryota
- Kingdom: Animalia
- Phylum: Arthropoda
- Class: Insecta
- Order: Coleoptera
- Suborder: Polyphaga
- Family: Dermestidae
- Genus: Anthrenus
- Subgenus: Peacockia; Menier & Villemant, 1993

Species
- See text.

= Peacockia =

Subgenus of beetles

Peacockia is a subgenus of the genus Anthrenus of the subfamily Megatominae within the family of skin beetles. Only one African species is currently described.

== Description ==
Species have antennae with 6 segments, parallel body shape, 5.0 - 7.1 mm in length (bigger than Setapeacockia). Dorsal surface is covered with scales.

In females, all visible abdominal sternites are covered by scales.

== Species ==
There is only one species in the subgenus, with previous members being transferred to related subgenus Setapeacockia (Háva, 2008):

- Anthrenus vladimiri (Menier & Villemant, 1993) – Morocco

== See also ==
- Setapeacockia
