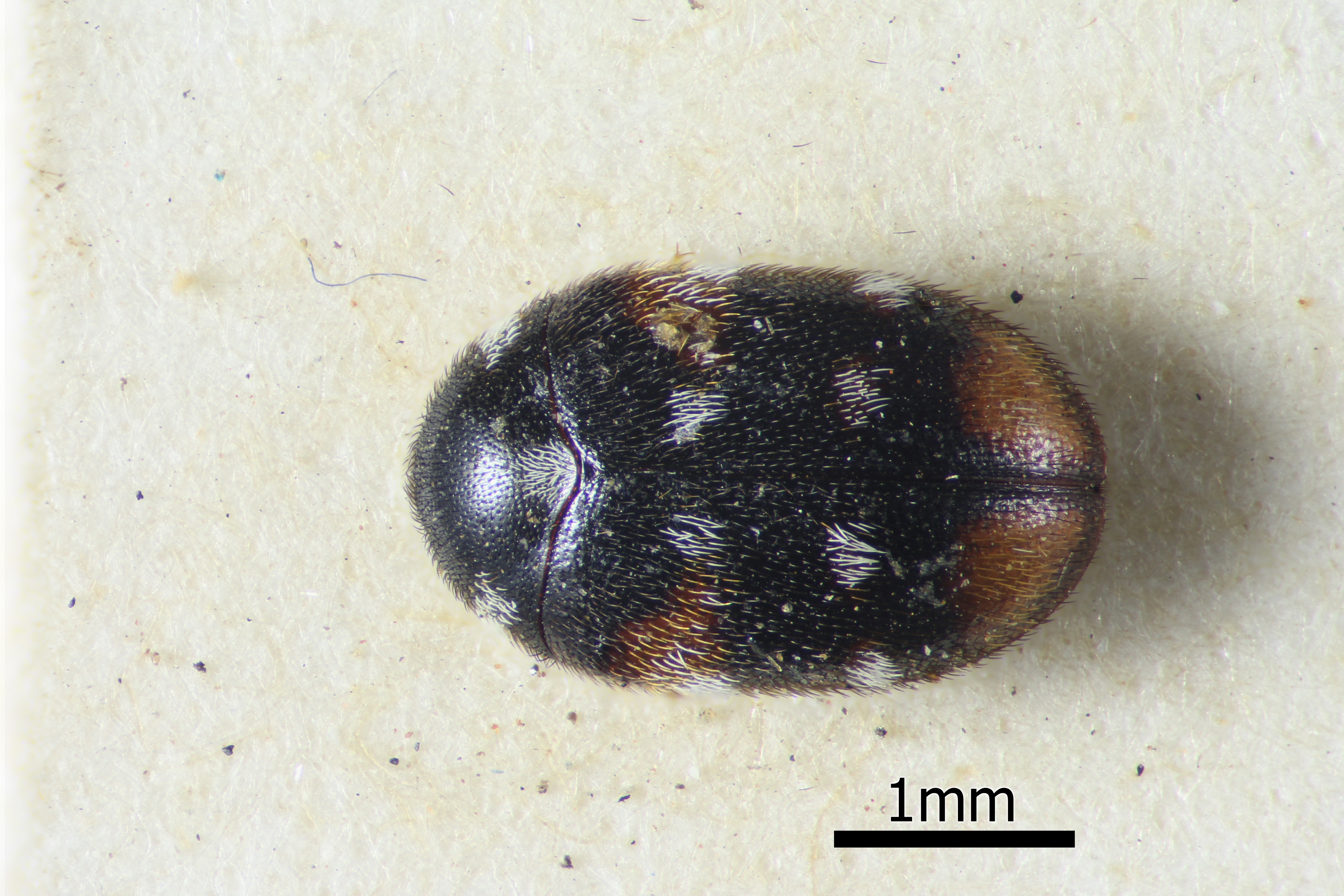

Scientific classification
- Kingdom: Animalia
- Phylum: Arthropoda
- Class: Insecta
- Order: Coleoptera
- Suborder: Polyphaga
- Family: Dermestidae
- Genus: Phradonoma
- Species: P. eximium

Binomial name
- Phradonoma eximium (Arrow, 1915)

Synonyms
- Trogoderma eximium Arrow, 1915

= Phradonoma eximium =

Species of beetle

Phradonoma eximium is a species of skin beetle known from Botswana, Congo, Namibia, South Africa, Tanzania, Zambia, and Zimbabwe.
