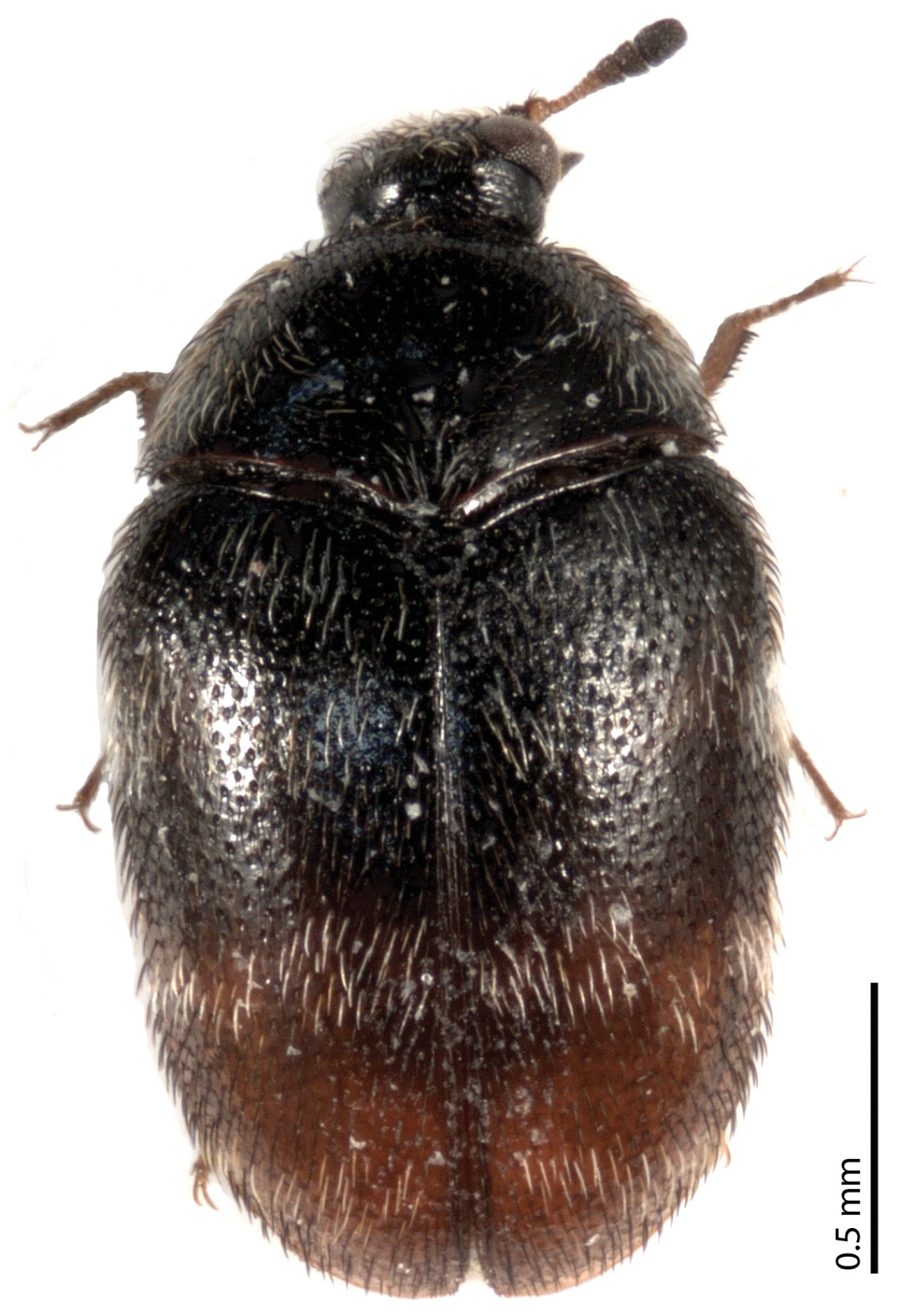
- Phradonoma blabolili

Scientific classification
- Domain: Eukaryota
- Kingdom: Animalia
- Phylum: Arthropoda
- Class: Insecta
- Order: Coleoptera
- Suborder: Polyphaga
- Family: Dermestidae
- Subfamily: Megatominae
- Tribe: Megatomini
- Subtribe: Trogodermina
- Genus: Phradonoma; Jacquelin du Val, 1859

= Phradonoma =

Genus of beetles

Phradonoma is a genus of beetles in the family Dermestidae, containing the following species:

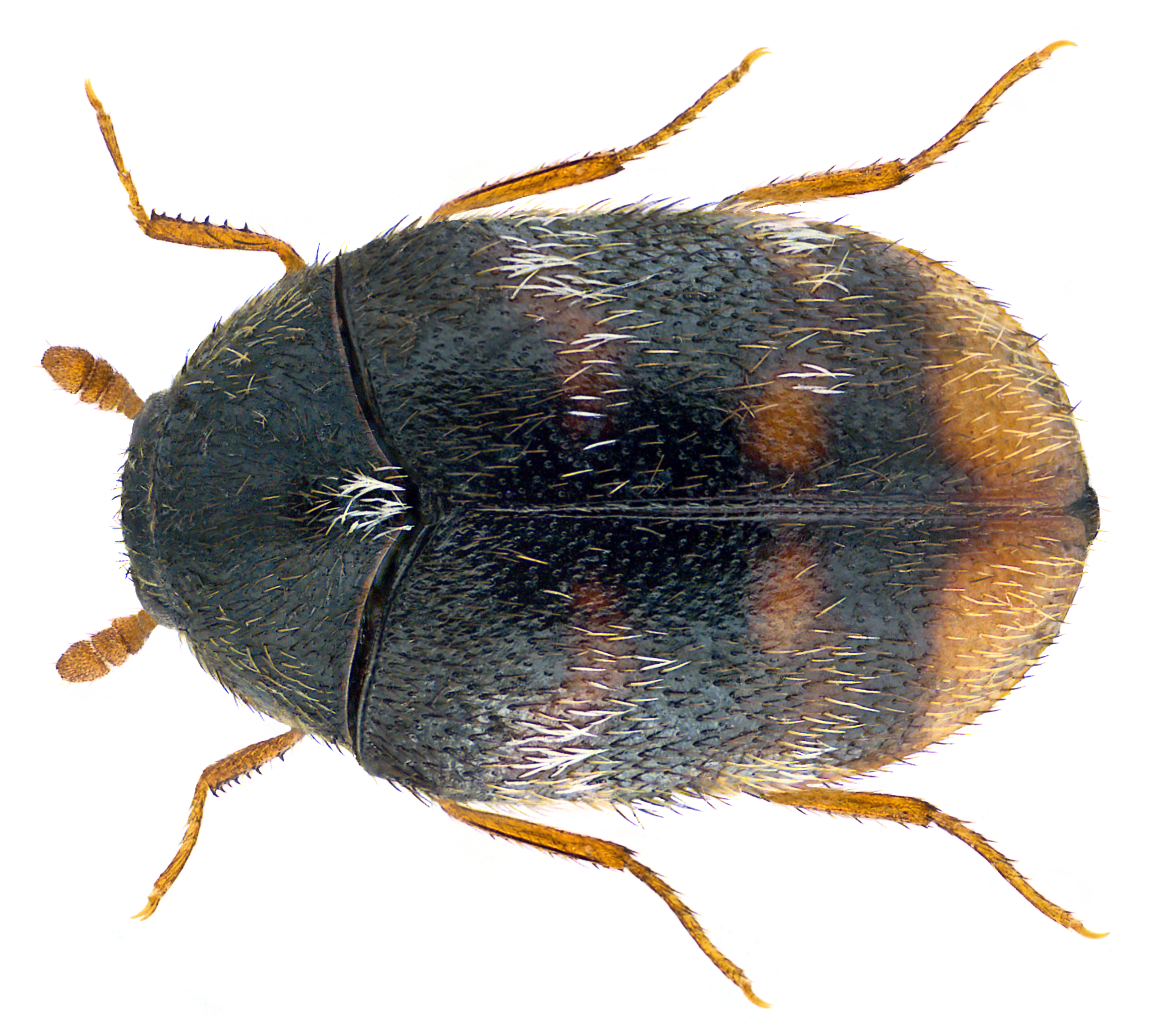
Phradonoma nobile

- Phradonoma albonotatum Pic, 1927
- Phradonoma alium Háva, 2006
- Phradonoma amoenulum Reitter, 1889
- Phradonoma babaulti Pic, 1921
- Phradonoma borowieci Háva & Kadej, 2006
- Phradonoma buddha Háva & Kadej, 2007
- Phradonoma calliesi Peyerimhoff, 1928
- Phradonoma cercyonoides Reitter, 1887
- Phradonoma constantini Herrmann & Háva, 2005
- Phradonoma dichroum Reitter, 1900
- Phradonoma draco Háva, 2006
- Phradonoma endroedyi Háva, 2003
- Phradonoma eximium Arrow, 1915
- Phradonoma funestum Reitter, 1881
- Phradonoma haemorrhoum Gerstaecker, 1871
- Phradonoma hirsutulum Reiche in Mulsant & Rey, 1868
- Phradonoma incognitum Háva, 2006
- Phradonoma interruptum Thunberg, 1781
- Phradonoma jelineki Háva, 2006
- Phradonoma maculifasciatum Reitter, 1887
- Phradonoma magnum Herrmann & Háva, 2005
- Phradonoma monachus Háva, 2006
- Phradonoma namibicum Háva, 2005
- Phradonoma nebulosum Háva, 2006
- Phradonoma nigrum Háva, 2006
- Phradonoma nobile Reitter, 1881
- Phradonoma oculatum Háva, 2004
- Phradonoma parthicum Zhantiev, 1976
- Phradonoma piceum Háva, 2002
- Phradonoma simile Háva, 2006
- Phradonoma spectum Háva, 2006
- Phradonoma tricolor Arrow, 1915
- Phradonoma trizonatum Fairmaire, 1883
- Phradonoma turcomanicum Mroczkowski, 1960
- Phradonoma uninotatum Pic, 1942
- Phradonoma villosulum Duftschmid, 1825
