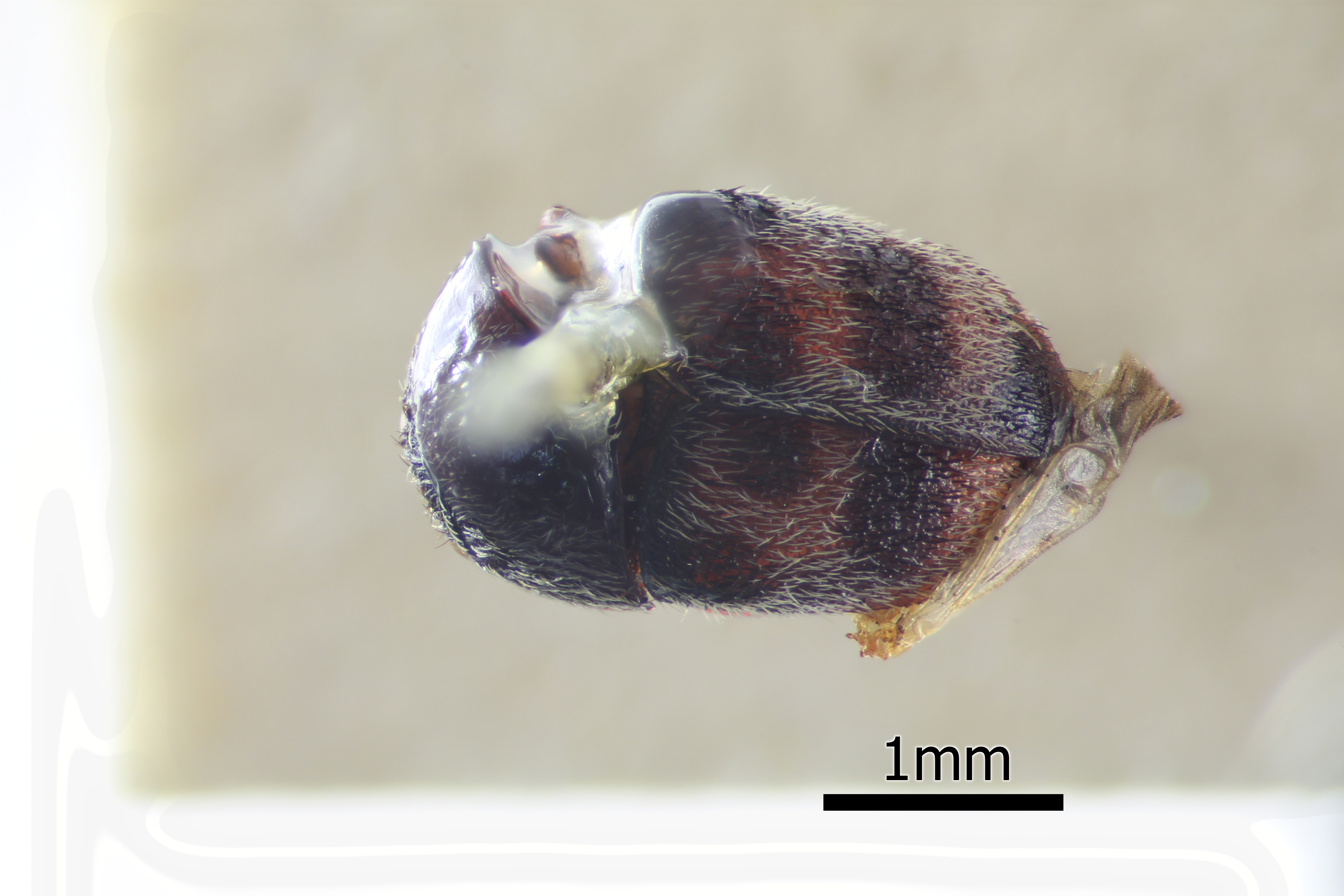
- Thaumaglossa tonkinea

Scientific classification
- Kingdom: Animalia
- Phylum: Arthropoda
- Class: Insecta
- Order: Coleoptera
- Suborder: Polyphaga
- Family: Dermestidae
- Genus: Thaumaglossa
- Species: T. tonkinea

Binomial name
- Thaumaglossa tonkinea Pic, 1916

= Thaumaglossa tonkinea =

Species of beetle

Thaumaglossa tonkinea, is a species of skin beetle found in Malaysia, Singapore, Thailand, Vietnam, China, Taiwan and probably Sri Lanka.

== Description ==
This oval shaped beetle has a total body length is about 2.5 to 2.9 mm.
