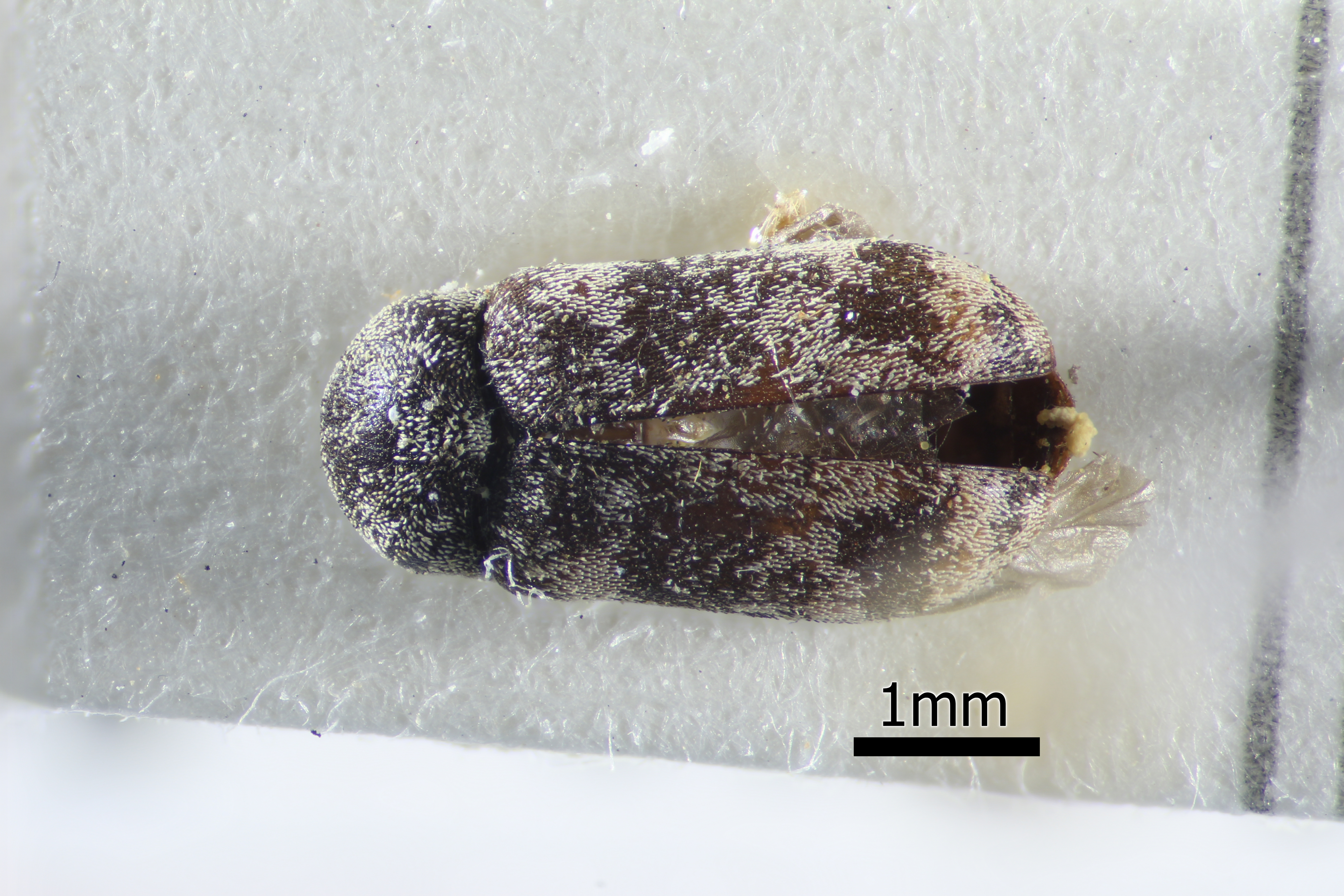

Scientific classification
- Kingdom: Animalia
- Phylum: Arthropoda
- Class: Insecta
- Order: Coleoptera
- Suborder: Polyphaga
- Family: Dermestidae
- Genus: Anthrenus
- Subgenus: Peacockia
- Species: A. vladimiri

Binomial name
- Anthrenus vladimiri Menier & Villemant, 1993

= Anthrenus vladimiri =

Species of beetle

Anthrenus vladimiri is a species of carpet beetle in the family Dermestidae. The species is only known from Morocco in Africa.
