= Anthrenus taricus =

Scientific classification
- Kingdom: Animalia
- Phylum: Arthropoda
- Class: Insecta
- Order: Coleoptera
- Suborder: Polyphaga
- Family: Dermestidae
- Genus: Anthrenus
- Subgenus: Setapeacockia
- Species: A. taricus

Binomial name
- Anthrenus taricus Zhantiev, 2006

Species of beetle

Anthrenus (Setapeacockia) taricus is a species of carpet beetle found in India (Rajasthan), Iran, and Pakistan.
