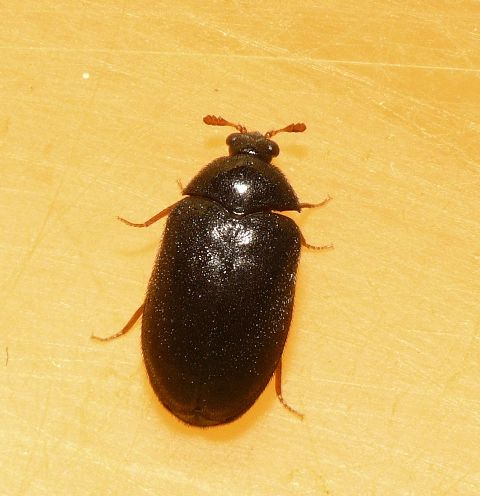
- Ctesias serra

Scientific classification
- Domain: Eukaryota
- Kingdom: Animalia
- Phylum: Arthropoda
- Class: Insecta
- Order: Coleoptera
- Suborder: Polyphaga
- Family: Dermestidae
- Subfamily: Megatominae
- Tribe: Megatomini
- Genus: Ctesias; Stephens, 1830

= Ctesias (beetle) =

Genus of beetles

Ctesias is a genus of beetles in the family Dermestidae, the skin beetles. They are distributed in the Palearctic, including Europe. There are about 23 species.

== Taxonomy ==
According to World Dermestidae catalogue (Jiří Háva, 2023), following taxonomic division is proposed with 4 subgenera in genus Ctesias:

- Dermestidae
  - Megatominae
    - Anthrenini
    - Megatomini
    - Ctesiini
      - Ctesias
        - Ctesias s. str.
        - Decemctesias
        - Novemctesias
        - Tiresiomorpha
  - Dermestinae
  - Thorictinae
  - Orphilinae
  - Trinodinae
  - Attageninae
  - Trogoparvinae

== Species ==
These species in genus Ctesias are currently known:

Subgenus Ctesias:

- Ctesias dusmae Beal, 1960
- Ctesias hebei Háva, 2004
- Ctesias orientalis Zhantiev, 1988
- Ctesias serra (Fabricius, 1792) – cobweb beetle

Subgenus Decemctesias:

- Ctesias amoenus Háva, 2012
- Ctesias eggeri Herrmann & Háva, 2010
- Ctesias intermedia Mroczkowski, 1961
- Ctesias iranica Háva, 2005
- Ctesias kaliki Mroczkowski, 1961
- Ctesias maculifasciata Reitter, 1899
- Ctesias morocco Háva, 2000
- Ctesias mroczkowskii Háva & Kadej, 2014
- Ctesias olexai Háva, 2008
- Ctesias similis Háva, 2005
- Ctesias syriaca Ganglbauer, 1904
- Ctesias sogdiana Zhantiev, 1975
- Ctesias tschuiliensis Sokolov, 1972
- Ctesias yuliyae Háva in Nakládal & Háva, 2015

Subgenus Novemctesias:

- Ctesias fasciata Zhantiev, 1975
- Ctesias nuratavica Sokolov, 1983

Subgenus Tiresiomorpha:

- Ctesias dakariensis Herrmann & Háva, 2009
- Ctesias gambiensis Háva, 2022
- Ctesias gemma Zhantiev, 1976
- Ctesias hajeki Háva, 2005
- Ctesias klapperichi (Pic, 1954)
- Ctesias schawalleri Háva, 2002
- Ctesias taiensis Háva & Matsumoto, 2021
- Ctesias variegata Arrow, 1915
