= Setapeacockia =

Scientific classification
- Domain: Eukaryota
- Kingdom: Animalia
- Phylum: Arthropoda
- Class: Insecta
- Order: Coleoptera
- Suborder: Polyphaga
- Family: Dermestidae
- Genus: Anthrenus
- Subgenus: Setapeacockia; Háva, 2008

Species
- See text.

Subgenus of beetles

Setapeacockia is a subgenus of the genus Anthrenus of the subfamily Megatominae within the family of skin beetles.

The taxonomic name is a composite of words seta and subgenus name Peacockia (referring to the shared unusual body characteristics).

== Description ==
Species have antennae with 6 segments, parallel body shape, 2.3 - 2.7 mm in length (smaller than Peacockia). Dorsal surface is covered with scales.

In females, only the 5th abdominal sternite is covered in setae (in males, visible abdominal sternites I-V are covered with scales).

== Species ==
There are currently 2 species in the subgenus which previously belonged to subgenus Peacockia:

- Anthrenus mendax (Háva, 2006) – Iran
- Anthrenus taricus (Zhantiev, 2006) – India (Rajastan); Iran; Pakistan

== See also ==
- Peacockia
