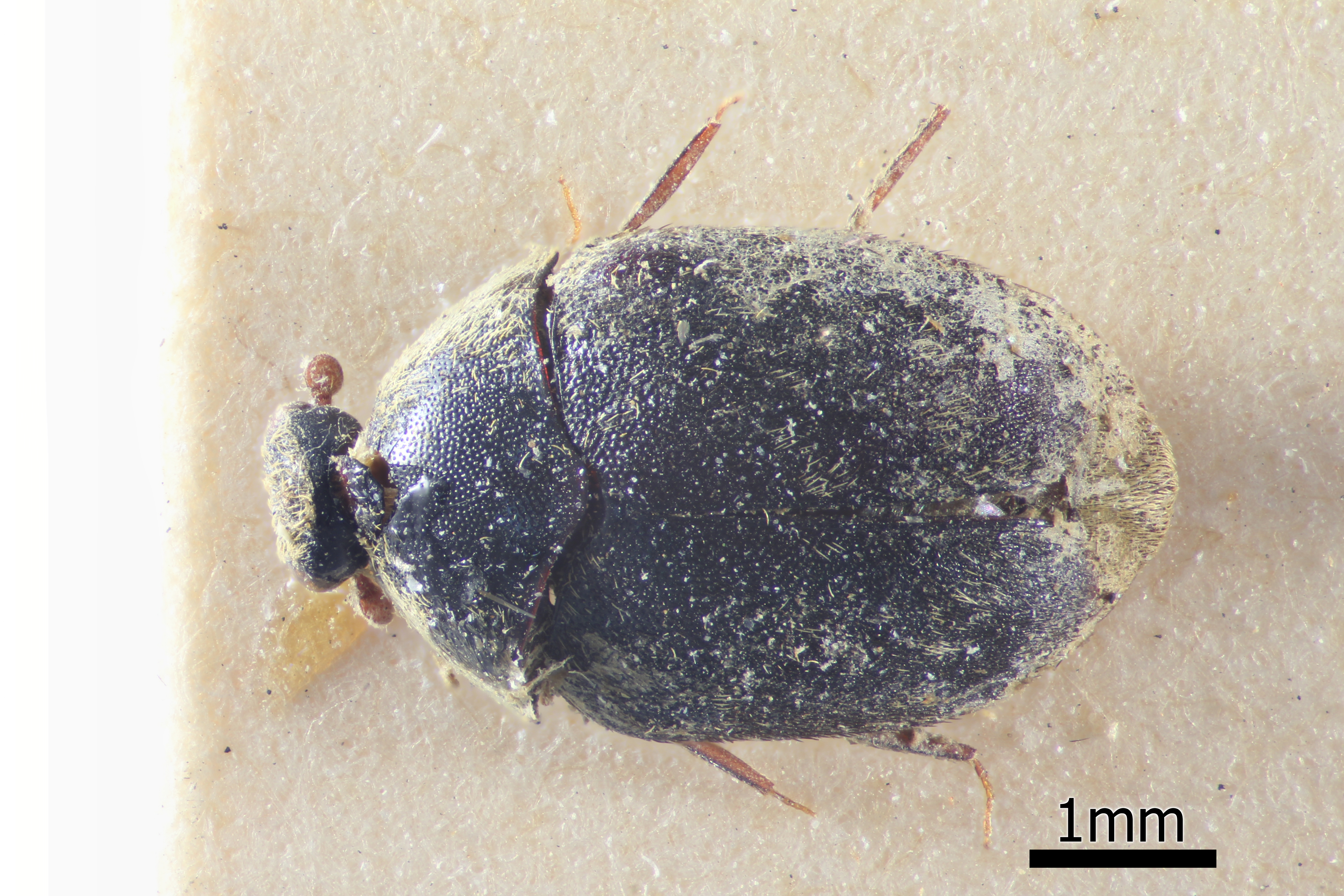
- Thaumaglossa africana Kalik female

Scientific classification
- Kingdom: Animalia
- Phylum: Arthropoda
- Clade: Pancrustacea
- Class: Insecta
- Order: Coleoptera
- Suborder: Polyphaga
- Family: Dermestidae
- Subfamily: Megatominae
- Tribe: Megatomini
- Subtribe: Orphinina
- Genus: Thaumaglossa; Redtenbacher, 1867

= Thaumaglossa =

Genus of beetles

Thaumaglossa is a genus of beetles in the family Dermestidae, containing the following species:

- Thaumaglossa americana Jayne, 1882
- Thaumaglossa anthrenoides Pic, 1918
- Thaumaglossa arabuko Háva, 2003
- Thaumaglossa basilewskyi Kalík, 1955
- Thaumaglossa bellissima Háva, 2005
- Thaumaglossa bimaculata Arrow, 1915
- Thaumaglossa boana Háva, 2000
- Thaumaglossa chapadana Háva, Kadej & Casari, 2006
- Thaumaglossa chujoi Ohbayashi, 1982
- Thaumaglossa concavifrons Reitter, 1881
- Thaumaglossa conradti Pic, 1927
- Thaumaglossa dembickyi Háva, 2002
- Thaumaglossa ghana Háva, 2002
- Thaumaglossa herrmanni Háva, 2003
- Thaumaglossa hilleri Reitter, 1881
- Thaumaglossa holubi Háva & Kadej, 2006
- Thaumaglossa horaki Háva, 2003
- Thaumaglossa indiana Veer, Chauhan & Singh, 2004
- Thaumaglossa javana Háva, 2006
- Thaumaglossa jendeki Háva, 2003
- Thaumaglossa laeta Arrow, 1915
- Thaumaglossa libochor Beal, 1952
- Thaumaglossa ludgerschmidti Háva & Herrmann, 2002
- Thaumaglossa mroczkowskii Háva & Kadej, 2005
- Thaumaglossa nigricans MacLeay, 1871
- Thaumaglossa nitidula Arrow, 1915
- Thaumaglossa pauliani Pic in Paulian, 1953
- Thaumaglossa peacockae Háva, 2005
- Thaumaglossa petrstanda Háva, 2003
- Thaumaglossa postlimbata Pic, 1948
- Thaumaglossa pseudohilleri Háva, 2006
- Thaumaglossa purpurea Pic, 1915
- Thaumaglossa pygidialis Pic, 1916
- Thaumaglossa rihai Háva, 2002
- Thaumaglossa rufiventris Pic, 1927
- Thaumaglossa rufocapillata Redtenbacher, 1867
- Thaumaglossa rufocincta Arrow, 1915
- Thaumaglossa rufofasciata Pic, 1915
- Thaumaglossa rufomaculata Pic, 1938
- Thaumaglossa rufula Pic, 1931
- Thaumaglossa tonkinea Pic, 1916
- Thaumaglossa uninotata Pic, 1954
- Thaumaglossa weigeli Háva, 2006
- Thaumaglossa wittmeri Háva, 2006
- Thaumaglossa yeti Háva, 2003
