= Caccoleptus =

Scientific classification
- Kingdom: Animalia
- Phylum: Arthropoda
- Class: Insecta
- Order: Coleoptera
- Suborder: Polyphaga
- Family: Dermestidae
- Subtribe: Orphinina
- Genus: Caccoleptus; Sharp, 1902

Genus of beetles

Caccoleptus is a genus of beetles in the family Dermestidae, containing the following species:

- Caccoleptus anisotomoides Sharp, 1902
- Caccoleptus honeymani Beal, 1979
- Caccoleptus ornatus Háva, 2004
- Caccoleptus pectinis Háva, 2004
- Caccoleptus rotundus Sharp, 1902
- Caccoleptus wicki Beal, 1978
