= Hirtomegatoma =

Scientific classification
- Kingdom: Animalia
- Phylum: Arthropoda
- Class: Insecta
- Order: Coleoptera
- Suborder: Polyphaga
- Family: Dermestidae
- Subtribe: Megatomina
- Genus: Hirtomegatoma; Pic, 1931

Genus of beetles

Hirtomegatoma is a genus of beetles in the family Dermestidae, containing the following species:

- Hirtomegatoma infasciata Pic, 1931
- Hirtomegatoma nigra Háva, 2003
