= Amberoderma =

Scientific classification
- Domain: Eukaryota
- Kingdom: Animalia
- Phylum: Arthropoda
- Class: Insecta
- Order: Coleoptera
- Suborder: Polyphaga
- Family: Dermestidae
- Subtribe: Trogodermina
- Genus: †Amberoderma
- Species: †A. beali

Binomial name
- †Amberoderma beali Háva & Prokop, 2004

Species of beetle

Amberoderma beali is an extinct species of beetle in the family Dermestidae, and is the only species in the genus Amberoderma.
