= Dearthrus =

Scientific classification
- Domain: Eukaryota
- Kingdom: Animalia
- Phylum: Arthropoda
- Class: Insecta
- Order: Coleoptera
- Suborder: Polyphaga
- Family: Dermestidae
- Tribe: Megatomini
- Subtribe: Megatomina
- Genus: Dearthrus; LeConte, 1861

Genus of beetles

Dearthrus is a genus of carpet beetles in the family Dermestidae local to North America. There are at least two described species in Dearthrus.

== Species ==
These two species belong to the genus Dearthrus:

- Dearthrus longulus LeConte, 1863
- Dearthrus stebbinsi Beal, 1954
