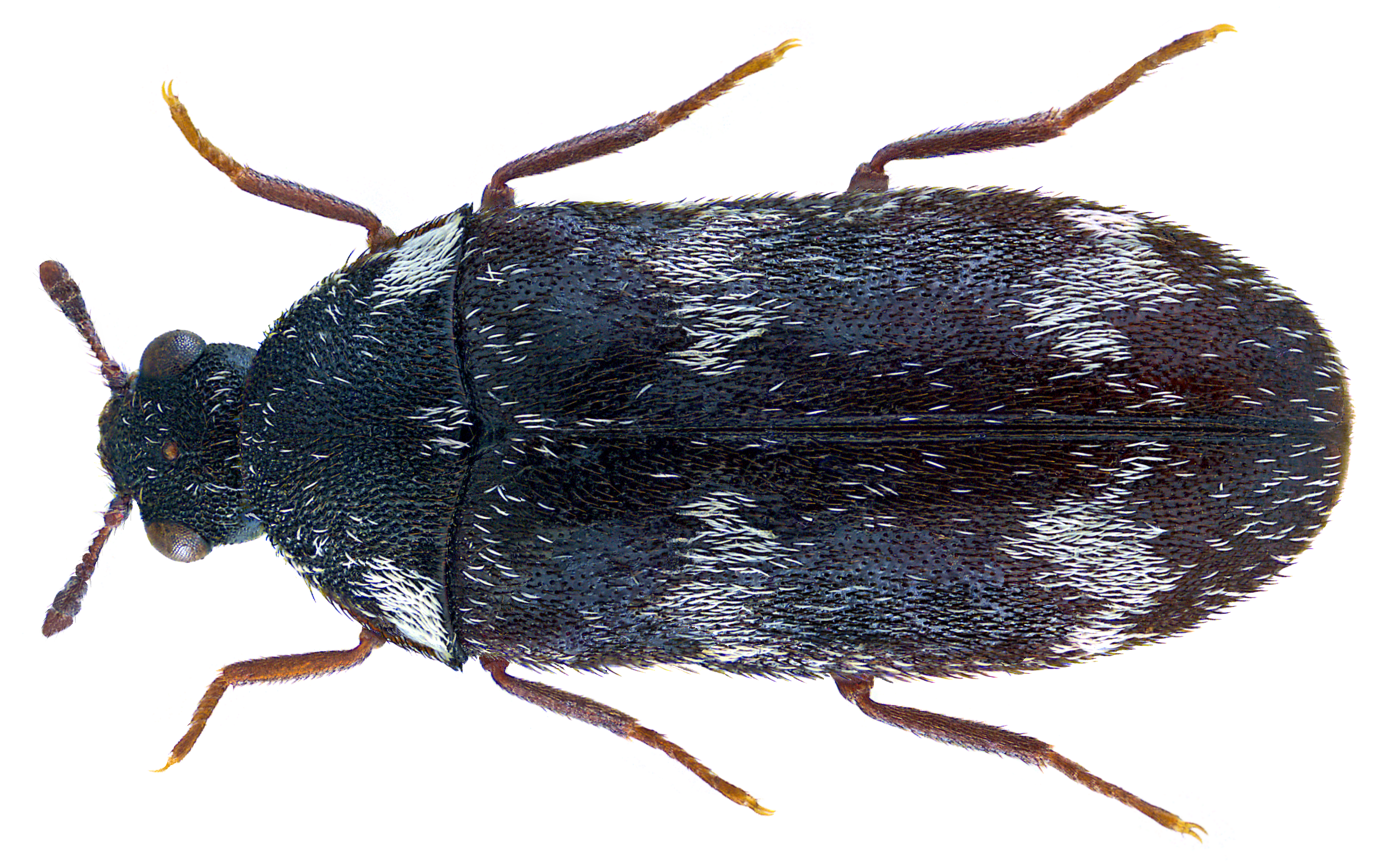
- Megatoma undata

Scientific classification
- Kingdom: Animalia
- Phylum: Arthropoda
- Class: Insecta
- Order: Coleoptera
- Suborder: Polyphaga
- Family: Dermestidae
- Subfamily: Megatominae
- Tribe: Megatomini; Leach, 1815

= Megatomini =

Tribe of beetles

The Megatomini are a tribe of insects in the family Dermestidae.

The tribe was first classified by William Elford Leach in The Edinburgh Encyclopaedia in 1815.

== Taxonomy ==
According to research in Zhou et al. (2022), only 3 major clades are recognized with support by both molecular and morphological data.

Megatomini classification by Zhou et al. (2022), with some genera excluded due to uncertain status (lack of research) and others revised given new research and further synonimization:

- Dermestidae
  - Megatominae
    - Megatomini
      - Orphinina
        - Caccoleptus
        - Curtophinus rev. nov.
        - Falsoorphinus rev. nov.
        - Labrocerus
        - Orphinus
        - Thaumaglossa
        - Zahradnikia
      - Megatomina
        - Globicornis (possible syn. Dearthrus)
        - Hirtomegatoma
        - Megatoma
        - Zhantievus
      - Trogodermina
        - Claviella
        - Cryptorhopalum
        - Eurhopalus rev. nov. (Note: Eurhopalus Solier in Gay, 1849 (= Sodaliatoma Háva, 2013 syn. nov., Reesa Beal, 1967 syn. nov., Neoanthrenus Armstrong, 1941 syn. nov., Anthrenocerus Arrow, 1915 syn. nov., Myrmeanthrenus Armstrong, 1945 syn. nov.). Many species of Trogoderma in Southern Hemisphere (Australia and South America for example) have been moved to genus Eurhopalus Solier in Gay, 1849 rev. nov.)
        - Phradonoma
        - Trogoderma
    - Anthrenini (Anthrenus and Dermeanthrenus)
    - Ctesiini (Ctesias)
  - other Dermestidae subfamilies

World Dermestidae catalogue (Jiří Háva, 2023) also separates subtribes Anthrenocerina and Cryptorhopalina. However genera of Anthrenocerina (Anthrenocerus and Myrmeanthrenus) are genetically closely related to species of Trogoderma and synonymous to neighboring, newly defined genus Eurhopalus.

Megatomini classification by Háva, 2023:

- Dermestidae
  - Megatominae
    - Megatomini
      - Orphinina
        - Caccoleptoides
        - Caccoleptus
        - Labrocerus
        - Liberorphinus
        - Orphinus
        - Pecticaccoleptus
        - Thaumaglossa
        - Zahradnikia
      - Megatomina
        - †Cretomegatoma
        - Dearthrus
        - Globicornis
        - Hirtomegatoma
        - Megatoma
        - Socotracornis
        - Sodaliatoma
        - Turcicornis
        - Zhantievus
      - Trogodermina
        - †Amberoderma
        - Orbeola
        - Paratrogoderma
        - Phradonoma
        - Reesa
        - Trogoderma
        - †Tuberphradonoma
        - Valdesetosum
      - Anthrenocerina
        - Anthrenocerus
        - Myrmeanthrenus
      - Cryptorhopalina
        - Claviella
        - Cryptorhopalum
        - †Miocryptorhopalum
    - Anthrenini (Anthrenus and Dermeanthrenus)
    - Ctesiini (Ctesias)
  - other Dermestidae subfamilies
