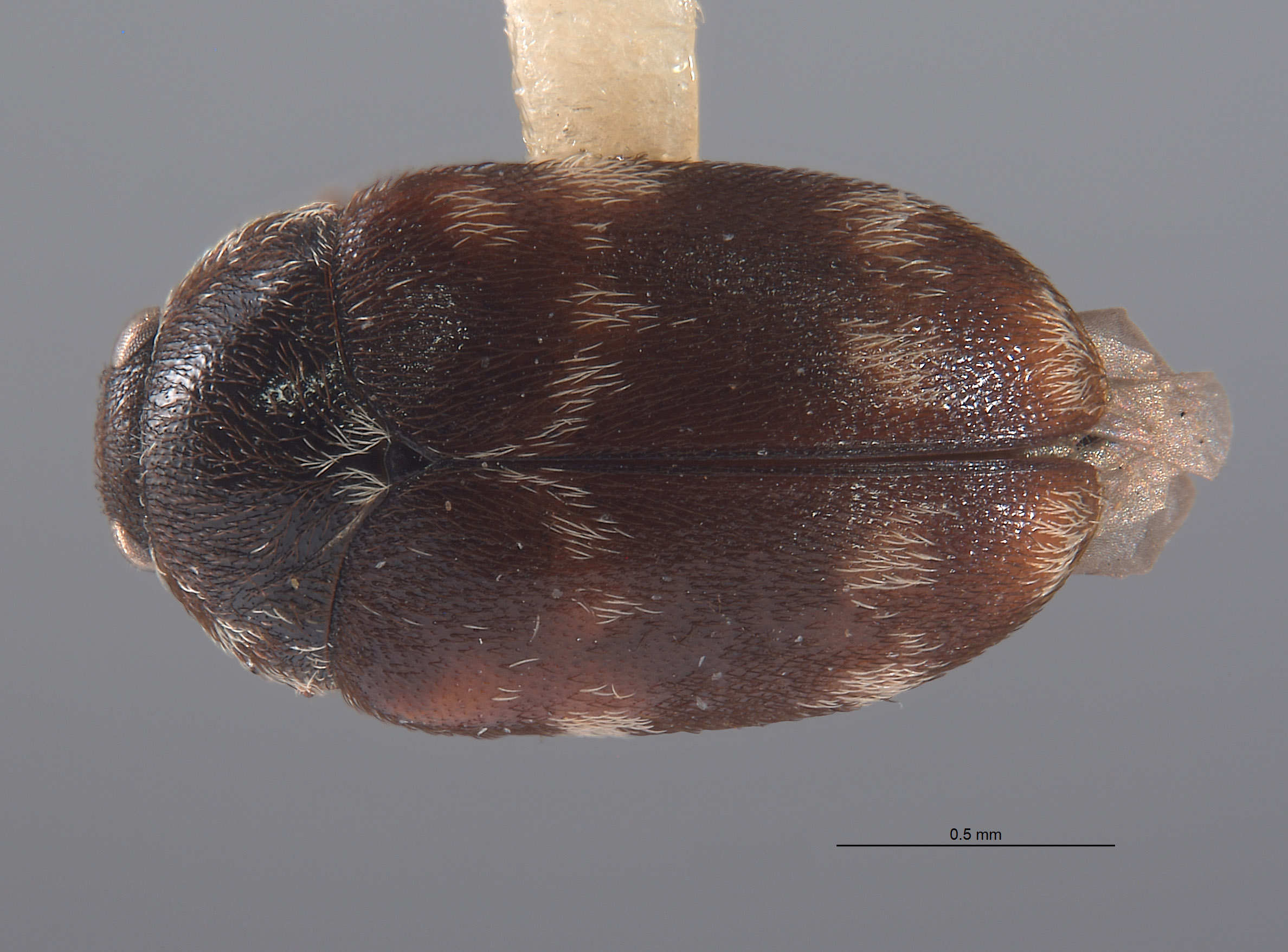
- Cryptorhopalum poorei, dorsal image
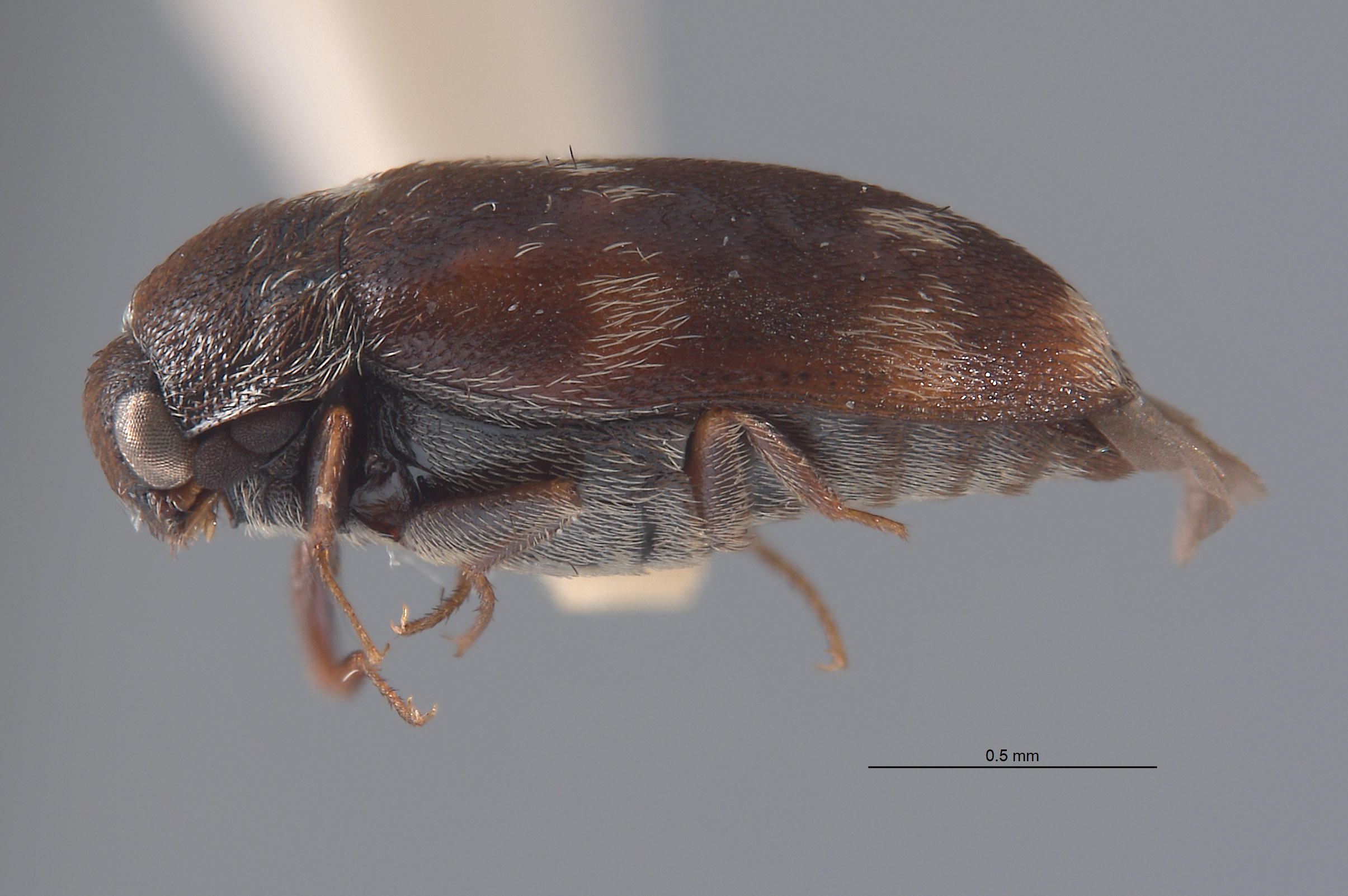
- Cryptorhopalum poorei, lateral image

Scientific classification
- Domain: Eukaryota
- Kingdom: Animalia
- Phylum: Arthropoda
- Class: Insecta
- Order: Coleoptera
- Suborder: Polyphaga
- Family: Dermestidae
- Subtribe: Cryptorhopalina
- Genus: Cryptorhopalum; Guérin-Méneville, 1838

Synonyms
- Hemirhopalum Sharp, 1902

= Cryptorhopalum =

Genus of beetles

Cryptorhopalum is a genus of beetles in the family Dermestidae which is known only from North to South America.

The genus contains the following species:

- Cryptorhopalum amulae Sharp, 1902
- Cryptorhopalum anthrenoides Casey, 1916
- Cryptorhopalum apicale Mannerheim, 1843
- Cryptorhopalum appendiculatum Sharp, 1902
- Cryptorhopalum argentinum Pic, 1916
- Cryptorhopalum aspilon Beal, 1985
- Cryptorhopalum atomarium Reitter, 1881
- Cryptorhopalum atripes Reitter, 1881
- Cryptorhopalum atropubescens Reitter, 1881
- Cryptorhopalum atrum Pic, 1936
- Cryptorhopalum baeri Pic, 1916
- Cryptorhopalum balteatum LeConte, 1854
- Cryptorhopalum bicolor Sharp, 1902
- Cryptorhopalum bilimeki Reitter, 1881
- Cryptorhopalum bimaculatum Reitter, 1881
- Cryptorhopalum biolleyi Pic, 1916
- Cryptorhopalum bisignatum Sharp, 1902
- Cryptorhopalum bolivianum Pic, 1916
- Cryptorhopalum brevicolle Sharp, 1902
- Cryptorhopalum brooksi Beal, 1995
- Cryptorhopalum bruchi Pic, 1928
- Cryptorhopalum brunnescente Pic, 1916
- Cryptorhopalum callanganum Pic, 1927
- Cryptorhopalum celatum Sharp, 1902
- Cryptorhopalum centromaculatum Reitter, 1881
- Cryptorhopalum claveri Pic, 1916
- Cryptorhopalum cleryi Guérin-Méneville, 1838
- Cryptorhopalum convexum Pic, 1927
- Cryptorhopalum corumbanum Pic, 1923
- Cryptorhopalum cribriceps Sharp, 1902
- Cryptorhopalum cribripenne Reitter, 1881
- Cryptorhopalum cyphonoide Sharp, 1902
- Cryptorhopalum diehli Pic, 1954
- Cryptorhopalum difficile Reitter, 1881
- Cryptorhopalum discedens Sharp, 1902
- Cryptorhopalum distichia Beal, 1985
- Cryptorhopalum divisum Sharp, 1902
- Cryptorhopalum dubium Sharp, 1902
- Cryptorhopalum ducale Sharp, 1902
- Cryptorhopalum equisoleae Sharp, 1902
- Cryptorhopalum eximium Arrow, 1915
- Cryptorhopalum felis Arrow, 1915
- Cryptorhopalum filitarse Casey, 1900
- Cryptorhopalum flammulatum Sharp, 1902
- Cryptorhopalum floridanum Casey, 1916
- Cryptorhopalum focale Beal, 1985
- Cryptorhopalum fraternum Sharp, 1902
- Cryptorhopalum funestum Sharp, 1902
- Cryptorhopalum fusculum LeConte, 1854
- Cryptorhopalum geniculatum Pic, 1916
- Cryptorhopalum germanum Sharp, 1902
- Cryptorhopalum globuloide Sharp, 1902
- Cryptorhopalum globulum Reitter, 1881
- Cryptorhopalum gounellei Pic, 1916
- Cryptorhopalum grandjeani Pic, 1942
- Cryptorhopalum gravidum Sharp, 1902
- Cryptorhopalum guatemalenum Sharp, 1902
- Cryptorhopalum guerini Pic, 1942
- Cryptorhopalum haemorrhoidale LeConte, 1824
- Cryptorhopalum haplotes Beal, 1979
- Cryptorhopalum heydeni Kirsch, 1873
- Cryptorhopalum hirsutum Pic, 1927
- Cryptorhopalum imperiale Reitter, 1881
- Cryptorhopalum incanum Reitter, 1881
- Cryptorhopalum infasciatum Pic, 1942
- Cryptorhopalum instabile Sharp, 1902
- Cryptorhopalum laterale Sharp, 1902
- Cryptorhopalum laticolle Pic, 1927
- Cryptorhopalum maculatum Fabricius, 1798
- Cryptorhopalum major Pic, 1927
- Cryptorhopalum mexicanum Pic, 1916
- Cryptorhopalum minor Pic, 1942
- Cryptorhopalum misellum Sharp, 1902
- Cryptorhopalum mordelloide Sharp, 1902
- Cryptorhopalum nevermanni Pic, 1936
- Cryptorhopalum nitidissimum Pic, 1916
- Cryptorhopalum notatum Pic, 1927
- Cryptorhopalum oberthuri Reitter, 1881
- Cryptorhopalum obesulum Casey, 1900
- Cryptorhopalum obscuriceps Pic, 1916
- Cryptorhopalum ochraceum Sharp, 1902
- Cryptorhopalum olivaceum Pic, 1927
- Cryptorhopalum orbiculosum Reitter, 1881
- Cryptorhopalum pedestre Sharp, 1902
- Cryptorhopalum perforatum Pic, 1927
- Cryptorhopalum peruvianum Pic, 1916
- Cryptorhopalum piceum Casey, 1916
- Cryptorhopalum pilosum Kirsch, 1870
- Cryptorhopalum poorei Beal, 1975
- Cryptorhopalum postnotatum Pic, 1927
- Cryptorhopalum preschi Beal, 1985
- Cryptorhopalum presuturale Pic, 1929
- Cryptorhopalum pruddeni Casey, 1900
- Cryptorhopalum puberulum Reitter, 1881
- Cryptorhopalum pumilum Casey, 1900
- Cryptorhopalum punctatissimum Reitter, 1881
- Cryptorhopalum quadrihamatus Beal, 1985
- Cryptorhopalum quadripunctatum Guérin-Méneville, 1838
- Cryptorhopalum quadrisignatum Pic, 1942
- Cryptorhopalum quinquepunctatum Reitter, 1881
- Cryptorhopalum reversum Casey, 1900
- Cryptorhopalum robustum Sharp, 1902
- Cryptorhopalum rubidum Beal, 1979
- Cryptorhopalum ruficorne LeConte, 1854
- Cryptorhopalum rufipenne Pic, 1916
- Cryptorhopalum rufipes Reitter, 1881
- Cryptorhopalum rufobrunneum Pic, 1942
- Cryptorhopalum rufofasciatum Reitter, 1881
- Cryptorhopalum rufonotatum Pic, 1916
- Cryptorhopalum rufum Pic, 1942
- Cryptorhopalum rugosipenne Pic, 1916
- Cryptorhopalum rugulosum Pic, 1923
- Cryptorhopalum rusticolle Pic, 1927
- Cryptorhopalum sahlbergi Reitter, 1881
- Cryptorhopalum sapindi Beal, 1985
- Cryptorhopalum scutellare Arrow, 1915
- Cryptorhopalum semihirsutum Pic, 1942
- Cryptorhopalum sexpunctatum Reitter, 1881
- Cryptorhopalum sexsignatum Reitter, 1881
- Cryptorhopalum sordidum Sharp, 1902
- Cryptorhopalum splendidum Reitter, 1881
- Cryptorhopalum stachi Mroczkowski, 1958
- Cryptorhopalum subcyaneum Pic, 1927
- Cryptorhopalum subfasciatum Sharp, 1902
- Cryptorhopalum submetallicum Pic, 1936
- Cryptorhopalum subtile Sharp, 1902
- Cryptorhopalum subtrifasciatum Reitter, 1881
- Cryptorhopalum teapense Sharp, 1902
- Cryptorhopalum teffensis Reitter, 1881
- Cryptorhopalum trifasciatum Pic, 1927
- Cryptorhopalum trisignatum Pic, 1942
- Cryptorhopalum triste LeConte, 1854
- Cryptorhopalum trogodermoides Reitter, 1881
- Cryptorhopalum truncatum Kirsch, 1870
- Cryptorhopalum unifasciatum Pic, 1954
- Cryptorhopalum uniforme Pic, 1927
- Cryptorhopalum uteanum Casey, 1916
- Cryptorhopalum vagesignatum Pic, 1942
- Cryptorhopalum ventanense Sharp, 1902
- Cryptorhopalum vernale Beal, 1985
- Cryptorhopalum vestitum Sharp, 1902
- Cryptorhopalum vianai Pic, 1940
- Cryptorhopalum vicinum Sharp, 1902
- Cryptorhopalum villosum Reitter, 1881
- Cryptorhopalum viridipubens Pic, 1923

== Fossil species group "electron" ==
- †Cryptorhopalum ambericum Háva & Prokop, 2004
- †Cryptorhopalum dominicanum Háva & Prokop, 2004
- †Cryptorhopalum electron Beal, 1972
- †Cryptorhopalum jantaricum Háva & Prokop, 2004
- †Cryptorhopalum kaliki Poinar & Háva, 2015
- †Cryptorhopalum macieji Poinar & Háva, 2015
