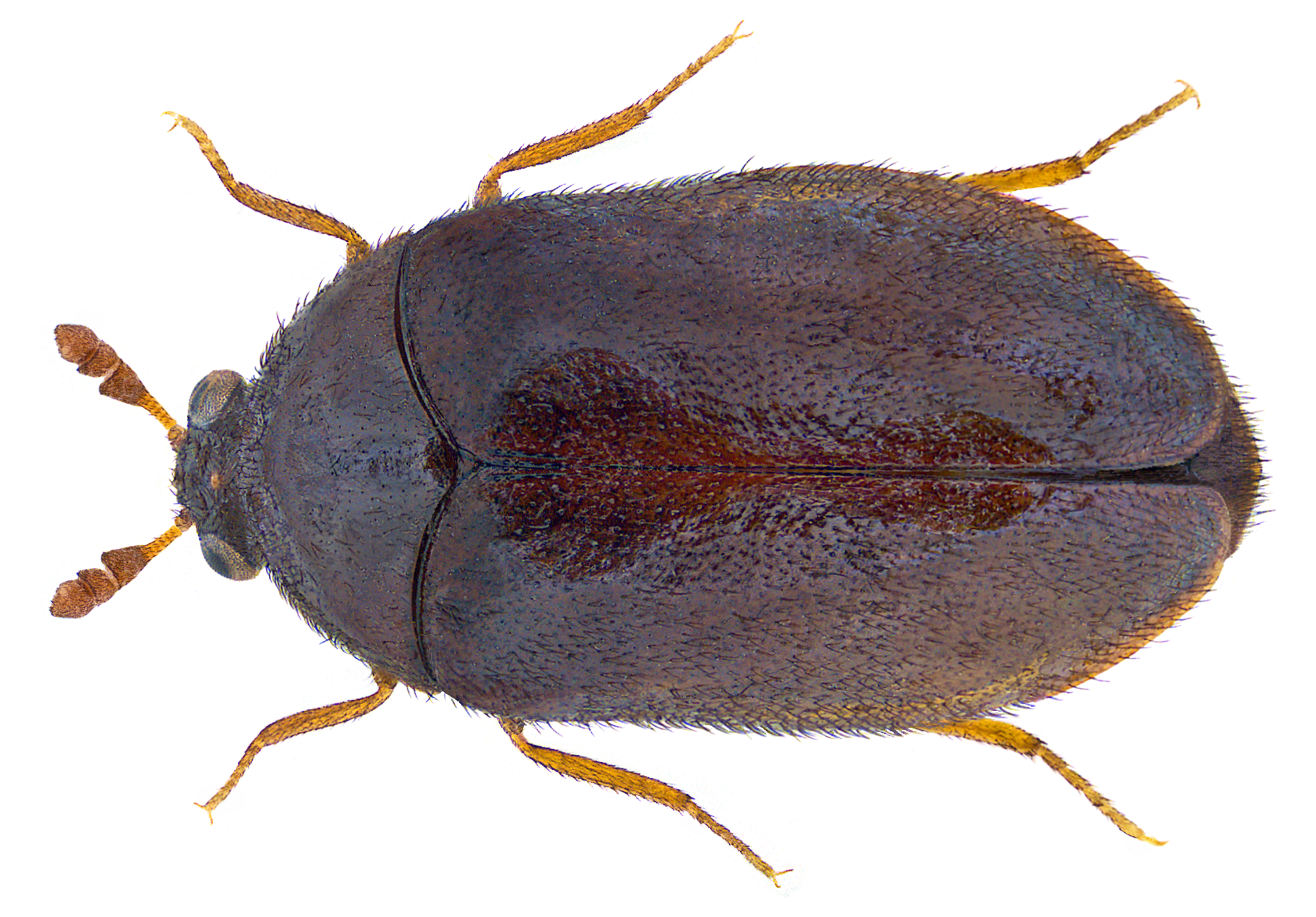

Scientific classification
- Kingdom: Animalia
- Phylum: Arthropoda
- Clade: Pancrustacea
- Class: Insecta
- Order: Coleoptera
- Suborder: Polyphaga
- Family: Dermestidae
- Genus: Ctesias
- Species: C. serra

Binomial name
- Ctesias serra (Fabricius, 1792)

= Ctesias serra =

Species of beetle

Ctesias serra, commonly known as the cobweb beetle, is a species of beetle native to England in the family Dermestidae.

The common name relates to the larva's habit of taking trapped insects from spiderwebs.

The preferred habitat is beneath old thick bark.

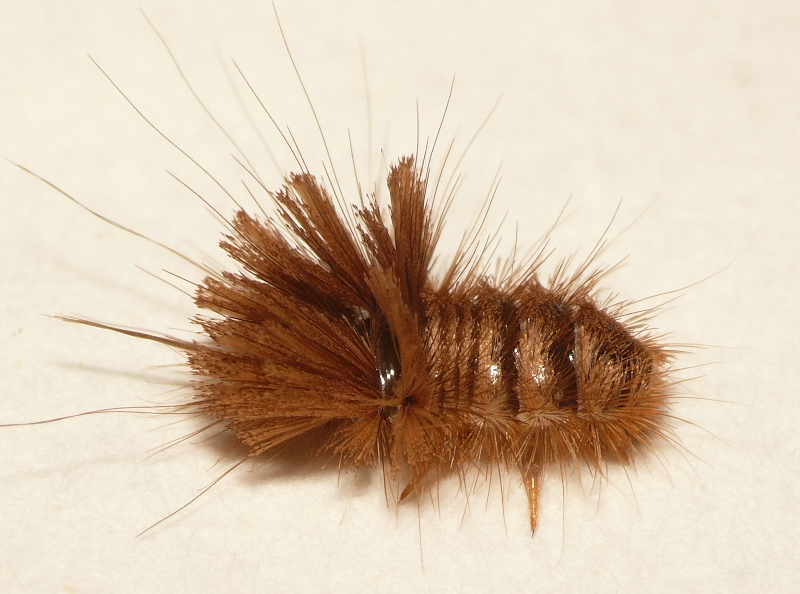
Ctesias serra larva
