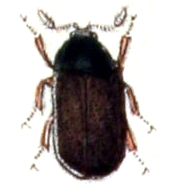
- Globicornis emarginata

Scientific classification
- Kingdom: Animalia
- Phylum: Arthropoda
- Class: Insecta
- Order: Coleoptera
- Suborder: Polyphaga
- Family: Dermestidae
- Subfamily: Megatominae
- Genus: Globicornis; Latreille, 1829

= Globicornis =

Genus of beetles

Globicornis is a genus of beetles in the family Dermestidae, the skin beetles. They are distributed throughout the world.

As of 2013 there are 27 species divided into 5 subgenera.

Species include:

- Globicornis alpina Pic, 1912
- Globicornis ambericus Háva, Prokop & Herrmann, 2006
- Globicornis antoniae Reitter, 1884
- Globicornis bifasciata Perris, 1866
- Globicornis bodemeyeri Ganglbauer in Bodemeyer, 1900
- Globicornis breviclavis Reitter in Schneider & Leder, 1878
- Globicornis cervinus Sturm, 1843
- Globicornis clavata Reitter, 1881
- Globicornis corticalis (Eichhoff, 1863)
- Globicornis depressa Mulsant & Rey, 1868
- Globicornis emarginata Gyllenhal, 1808
- Globicornis emeii Háva & Kadej, 2014
- Globicornis fasciata Fairmaire & Brisout, 1859
- Globicornis kafkai Háva, 2000
- Globicornis latenotata Pic, 1915
- Globicornis longulus LeConte, 1863
- Globicornis luckowi Herrmann, Háva & Kadej, 2011
- Globicornis maculatus Háva, 2004
- Globicornis mongolicus Zhantiev, 1973
- Globicornis nigripes Fabricius, 1792
- Globicornis picta Küster, 1851
- Globicornis quadriguttatus Reitter, 1878
- Globicornis quadrinaevus Reitter, 1908
- Globicornis quadripunctata Zhantiev, 1975
- Globicornis rufoguttatus Pic, 1899
- Globicornis semilimbata Pic, 1906
- Globicornis signatipennis Pic, 1899
- Globicornis stebbinsi Beal, 1954
- Globicornis sulcata Brisout de Barneville, 1866
- Globicornis tristis Reitter, 1881
- Globicornis variegata Küster, 1851
- Globicornis vaulogeri Pic, 1900
