= Labrocerus =

Scientific classification
- Kingdom: Animalia
- Phylum: Arthropoda
- Class: Insecta
- Order: Coleoptera
- Suborder: Polyphaga
- Family: Dermestidae
- Subtribe: Orphinina
- Genus: Labrocerus; Sharp in Blackburn & Sharp, 1885

Genus of beetles

Labrocerus is a genus of beetles in the family Dermestidae, containing the following species:

- Labrocerus argyroxiphii Beal, 2000
- Labrocerus auratus Beal, 2000
- Labrocerus concolor Sharp in Blackburn & Sharp, 1885
- Labrocerus curticornis Sharp, 1908
- Labrocerus dasytoides Sharp, 1908
- Labrocerus depressus Sharp, 1908
- Labrocerus jaynei Sharp in Blackburn & Sharp, 1885
- Labrocerus laticornis Sharp, 1908
- Labrocerus moerens Sharp, 1908
- Labrocerus obscurus Blackburn in Blackburn & Sharp, 1885
- Labrocerus obsoletus Sharp, 1908
- Labrocerus producens Beal, 2000
- Labrocerus quadrisignatus Sharp, 1908
- Labrocerus setosus Sharp, 1908
- Labrocerus similaris Sharp, 1908
- Labrocerus suffusus Sharp, 1908
- Labrocerus vestitus Sharp, 1908
