= Turcicornis =

Scientific classification
- Domain: Eukaryota
- Kingdom: Animalia
- Phylum: Arthropoda
- Class: Insecta
- Order: Coleoptera
- Suborder: Polyphaga
- Family: Dermestidae
- Genus: Turcicornis
- Species: T. kopeckyi

Binomial name
- Turcicornis kopeckyi Háva, 2000

Species of beetle

Turcicornis kopeckyi is a species of beetle in the family Dermestidae, the only species in the genus Turcicornis.
