= Zhantievus =

Scientific classification
- Kingdom: Animalia
- Phylum: Arthropoda
- Class: Insecta
- Order: Coleoptera
- Suborder: Polyphaga
- Family: Dermestidae
- Genus: Zhantievus
- Species: Z. lymantriae

Binomial name
- Zhantievus lymantriae Beal, 1992

Species of beetle

Zhantievus lymantriae is a species of beetle in the family Dermestidae, the only species in the genus Zhantievus.
