= Paratrogoderma =

Scientific classification
- Domain: Eukaryota
- Kingdom: Animalia
- Phylum: Arthropoda
- Class: Insecta
- Order: Coleoptera
- Suborder: Polyphaga
- Family: Dermestidae
- Genus: Paratrogoderma
- Species: P. mahense

Binomial name
- Paratrogoderma mahense Scott, 1926

Species of beetle

Paratrogoderma mahense is a species of beetles in the family Dermestidae, the only species in the genus Paratrogoderma.
