= Miocryptorhopalum =

Scientific classification
- Domain: Eukaryota
- Kingdom: Animalia
- Phylum: Arthropoda
- Class: Insecta
- Order: Coleoptera
- Suborder: Polyphaga
- Family: Dermestidae
- Genus: Miocryptorhopalum
- Species: M. kirkbyae

Binomial name
- Miocryptorhopalum kirkbyae Pierce, 1960

Species of beetle

Miocryptorhopalum kirkbyae is a species of beetle in the family Dermestidae, the only species in the genus Miocryptorhopalum.
