= Myrmeanthrenus =

Scientific classification
- Domain: Eukaryota
- Kingdom: Animalia
- Phylum: Arthropoda
- Class: Insecta
- Order: Coleoptera
- Suborder: Polyphaga
- Family: Dermestidae
- Genus: Myrmeanthrenus
- Species: M. frontalis

Binomial name
- Myrmeanthrenus frontalis Armstrong, 1945

Species of beetle

Myrmeanthrenus frontalis is a species of beetle in the family Dermestidae, the only species in the genus Myrmeanthrenus.
