= Claviella =

Scientific classification
- Domain: Eukaryota
- Kingdom: Animalia
- Phylum: Arthropoda
- Class: Insecta
- Order: Coleoptera
- Suborder: Polyphaga
- Family: Dermestidae
- Genus: Claviella
- Species: C. besucheti

Binomial name
- Claviella besucheti Kalík, 1987

Species of beetle

Claviella besucheti is a species of beetle in the family Dermestidae, the only species in the genus Claviella.
