= Trinodinae =

Scientific classification
- Domain: Eukaryota
- Kingdom: Animalia
- Phylum: Arthropoda
- Class: Insecta
- Order: Coleoptera
- Suborder: Polyphaga
- Family: Dermestidae
- Subfamily: Trinodinae; Casey, 1900

Subfamily of beetles

Trinodinae is a subfamily of beetles in the family Dermestidae, containing the following genera:

- Apsectus LeConte, 1854
- Evorinea Beal, 1961
- Hexanodes Blair, 1941
- Thylodrias Motschulsky, 1839
- Trichelodes Carter, 1935
- Trichodryas Lawrence & Slipinski, 2005
- Trinodes Dejean, 1821
- Trinoparvus Háva, 2004
