= Thorictinae =

Scientific classification
- Kingdom: Animalia
- Phylum: Arthropoda
- Clade: Pancrustacea
- Class: Insecta
- Order: Coleoptera
- Suborder: Polyphaga
- Family: Dermestidae
- Subfamily: Thorictinae; Agassiz, 1846

Subfamily of beetles

Thorictinae is a subfamily of beetles in the family Dermestidae, containing the following genera:

- Afrothorictus Andreae, 1967
- Macrothorictus Andreae, 1967
- Thorictodes Reitter, 1875
- Thorictus Germar, 1834
