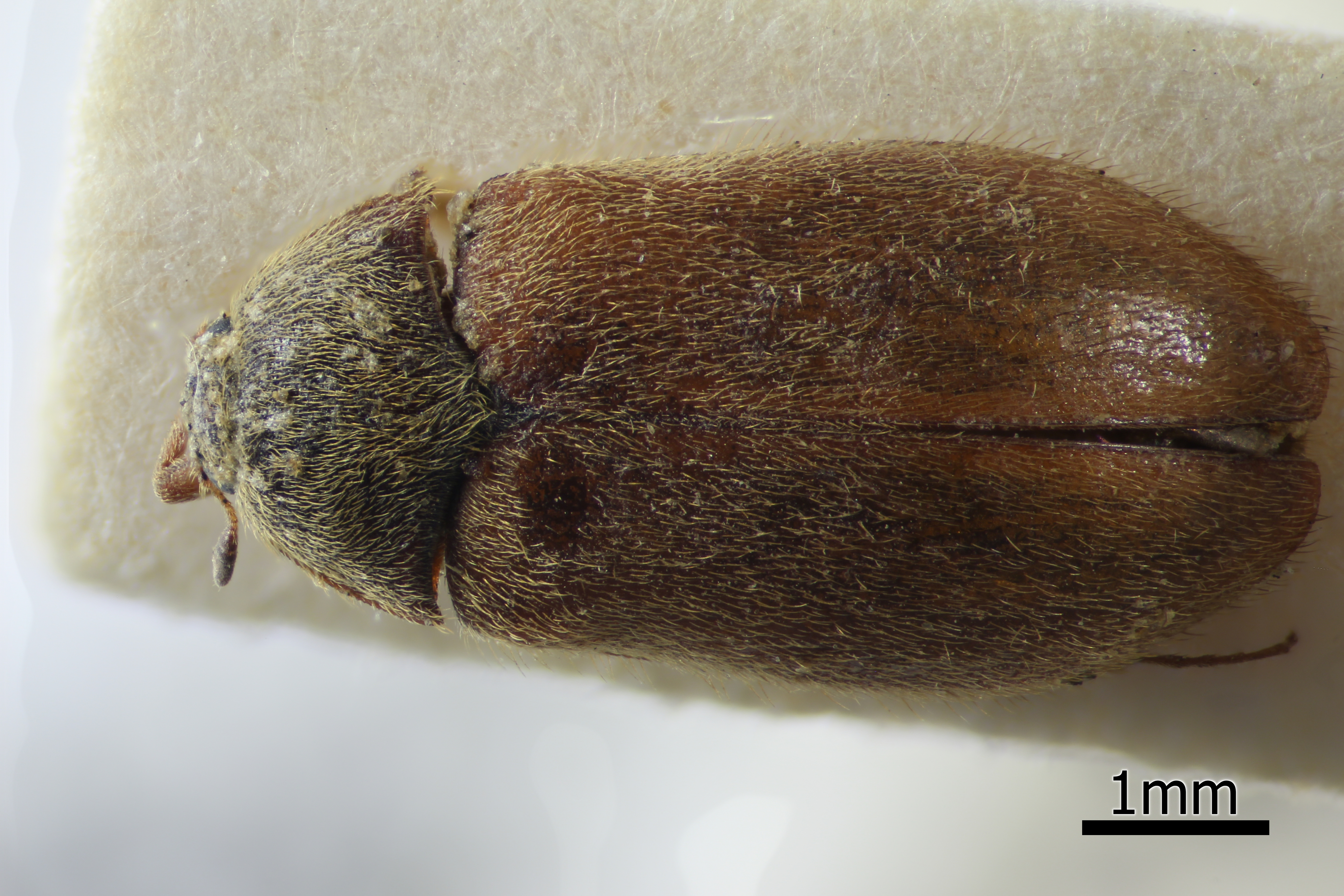

Scientific classification
- Kingdom: Animalia
- Phylum: Arthropoda
- Clade: Pancrustacea
- Class: Insecta
- Order: Coleoptera
- Suborder: Polyphaga
- Family: Dermestidae
- Genus: Attagenus
- Species: A. gobicola

Binomial name
- Attagenus gobicola Frivaldszky, 1892

Synonyms
- Attagenus augustatus gobicola Zhantiev, 1963

= Attagenus gobicola =

Species of beetle

Attagenus gobicola is a species of carpet beetle in the subfamily Attageninae, family Dermestidae. It is generally found in these regions of Asia: Afghanistan, northern China, India (Kashmir, Sikkim), Kazakhstan, Kyrgyzstan, Mongolia, Tajikistan, Turkmenistan. It has been introduced to European countries such as Belarus and Sweden.

The species was previously recognized as subspecies of Attagenus augustatus.
