= Attagenus augustatus =

Scientific classification
- Kingdom: Animalia
- Phylum: Arthropoda
- Clade: Pancrustacea
- Class: Insecta
- Order: Coleoptera
- Suborder: Polyphaga
- Family: Dermestidae
- Genus: Attagenus
- Species: A. augustatus

Binomial name
- Attagenus augustatus Ballion, 1871

Synonyms
- Attagenus angustatus Solsky, 1876; Hadrotoma angustata: Reitter, 1889; Globicornis angustata: Heyden, 1893

Species of beetle

Attagenus augustatus is a species of carpet beetle in the subfamily Attageninae, family Dermestidae. It is generally found in these regions of Asia: Afghanistan, China (Shaanxi, Sichuan, Tibet, Yunnan), Mongolia, Russia (Jakutsk), Tajikistan, Turkmenistan and Uzbekistan.

It is similar to Attagenus gobicola, which was previously recognized as subspecies.
