= Orphinus funestus =

Scientific classification
- Kingdom: Animalia
- Phylum: Arthropoda
- Clade: Pancrustacea
- Class: Insecta
- Order: Coleoptera
- Suborder: Polyphaga
- Family: Dermestidae
- Genus: Orphinus
- Species: O. funestus

Binomial name
- Orphinus funestus Arrow, 1915

Species of beetle

Orphinus funestus is a species of skin beetle found in Sri Lanka.

== Description ==
Very similar to sympatric species Orphinus guernei. Total body length is about 2.5 mm. The body is oblong-oval, and shiny.
