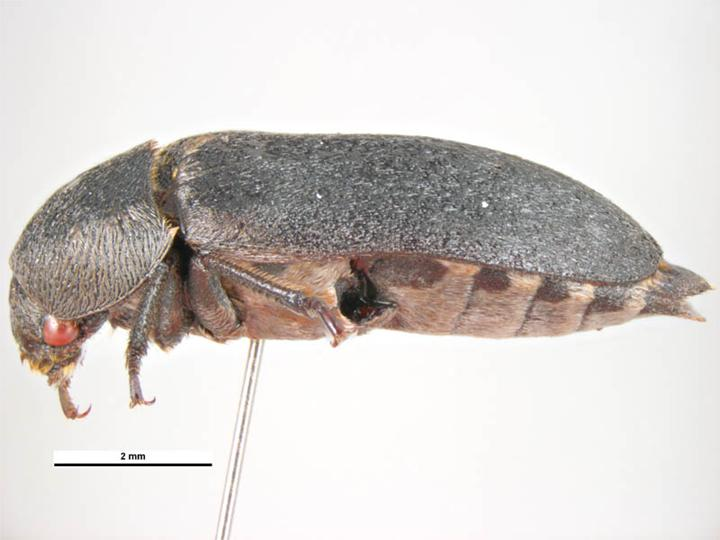
- Dermestes frischii

Scientific classification
- Kingdom: Animalia
- Phylum: Arthropoda
- Class: Insecta
- Order: Coleoptera
- Suborder: Polyphaga
- Family: Dermestidae
- Subfamily: Dermestinae; Latreille, 1804

= Dermestinae =

Dermestinae Temporal range: Middle Jurassic–Present

Subfamily of beetles

Dermestinae is a subfamily of beetles in the family Dermestidae. It contains the following genera:

- Derbyana Lawrence & Slipinski, 2005
- Dermestes Linnaeus, 1758
- Mariouta Pic, 1898
- Rhopalosilpha Arrow, 1929
- †Paradermestes Deng et al., 2017 Jiulongshan Formation, Middle Jurassic, China
