= Apsectus araneorum =

Scientific classification
- Kingdom: Animalia
- Phylum: Arthropoda
- Class: Insecta
- Order: Coleoptera
- Suborder: Polyphaga
- Family: Dermestidae
- Genus: Apsectus
- Species: A. araneorum

Binomial name
- Apsectus araneorum Beal, 1959

Species of beetle

Apsectus araneorum is a species of carpet beetle in the family Dermestidae. It is found in North America.
