= Orphinus tabitha =

Scientific classification
- Kingdom: Animalia
- Phylum: Arthropoda
- Class: Insecta
- Order: Coleoptera
- Suborder: Polyphaga
- Family: Dermestidae
- Genus: Orphinus
- Species: O. tabitha

Binomial name
- Orphinus tabitha Arrow, 1915

Species of beetle

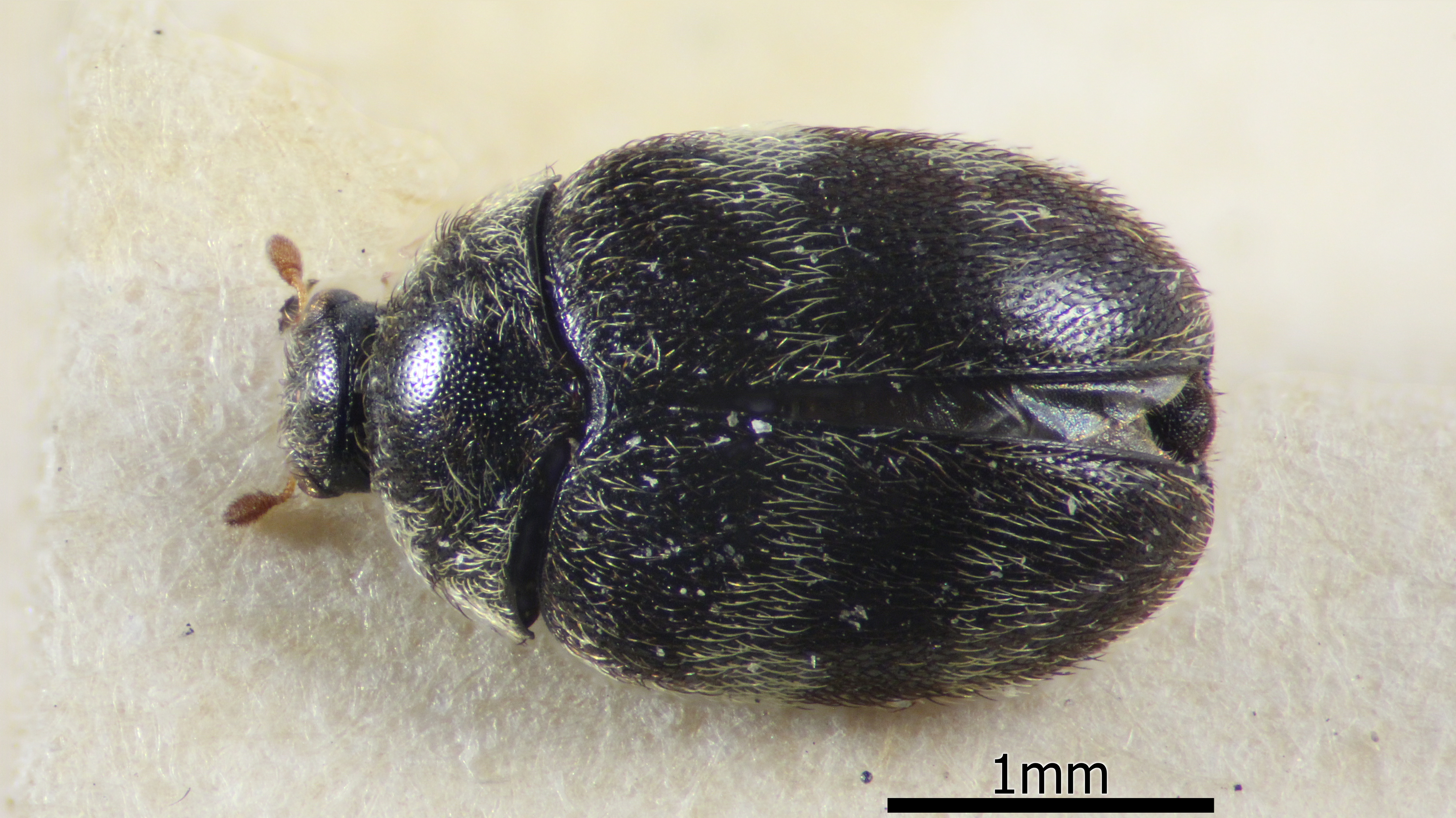

Orphinus tabitha, is a species of skin beetle found in South India and Sri Lanka.
