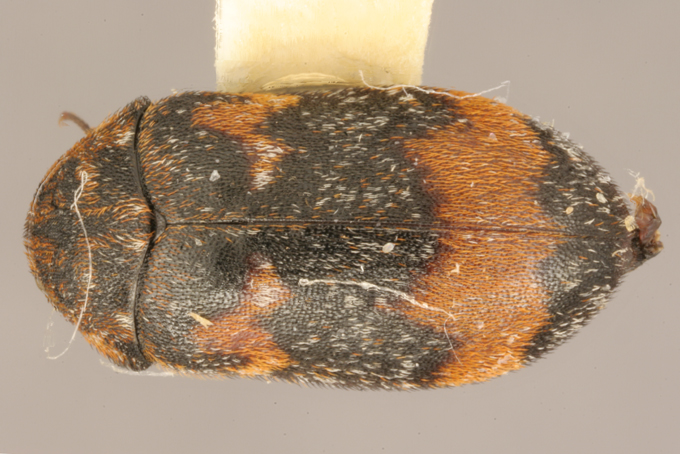
- Dorsal image
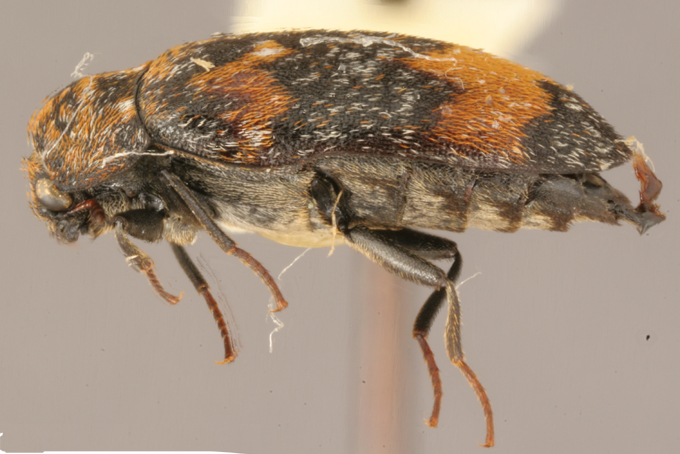
- Lateral image

Scientific classification
- Kingdom: Animalia
- Phylum: Arthropoda
- Class: Insecta
- Order: Coleoptera
- Suborder: Polyphaga
- Family: Dermestidae
- Subtribe: Megatomina
- Genus: Megatoma
- Species: M. ampla

Binomial name
- Megatoma ampla (Casey, 1900)

= Megatoma ampla =

Species of beetle

Megatoma ampla is a species of carpet beetle in the family Dermestidae. It is found in North America.
