= Megatoma variegata =

Scientific classification
- Domain: Eukaryota
- Kingdom: Animalia
- Phylum: Arthropoda
- Class: Insecta
- Order: Coleoptera
- Suborder: Polyphaga
- Family: Dermestidae
- Subtribe: Megatomina
- Genus: Megatoma
- Species: M. variegata

Binomial name
- Megatoma variegata (Horn, 1875)

Species of beetle

Megatoma variegata is a species of carpet beetle in the family Dermestidae. It is found in North America.
