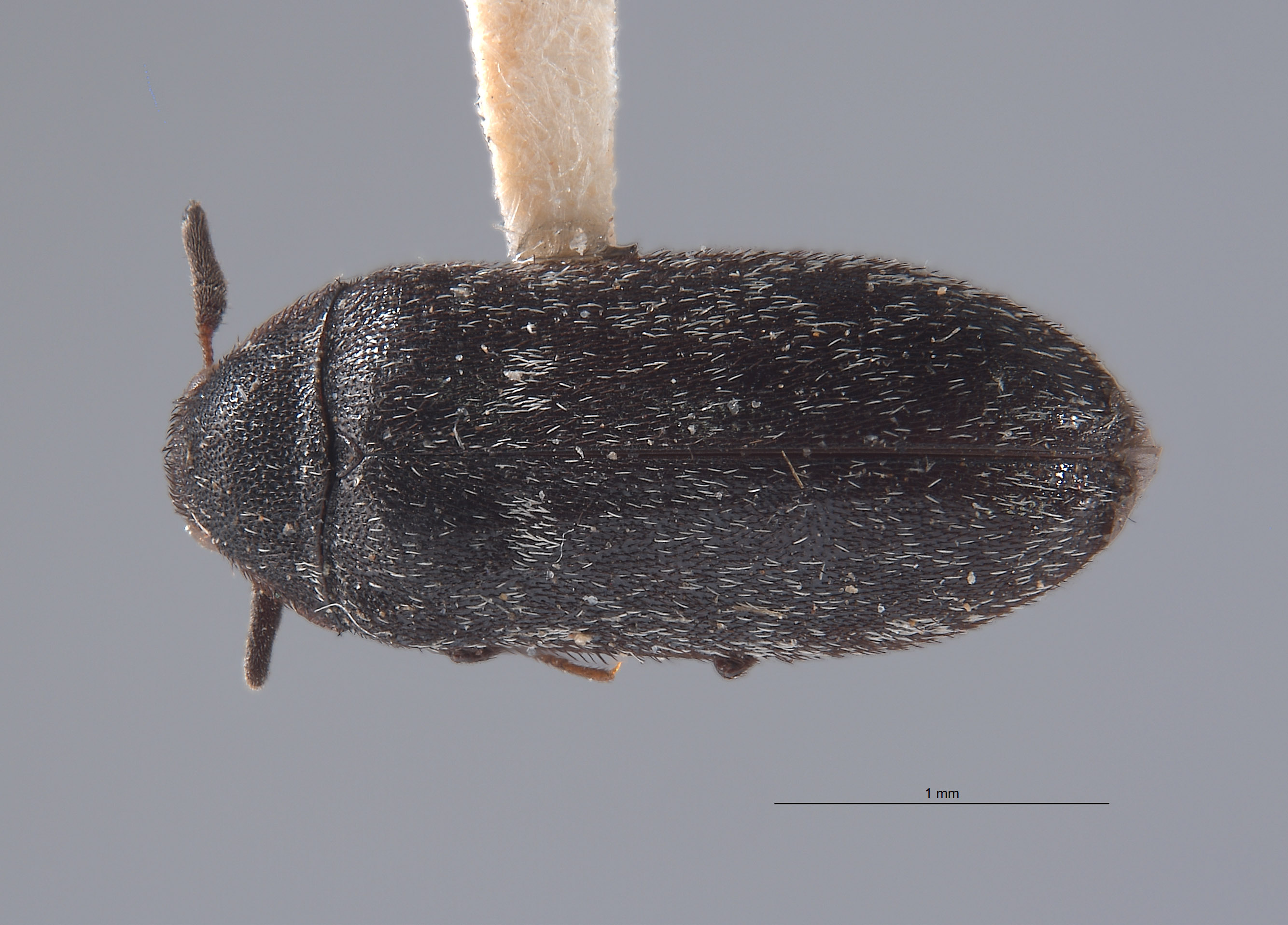
- Dorsal image
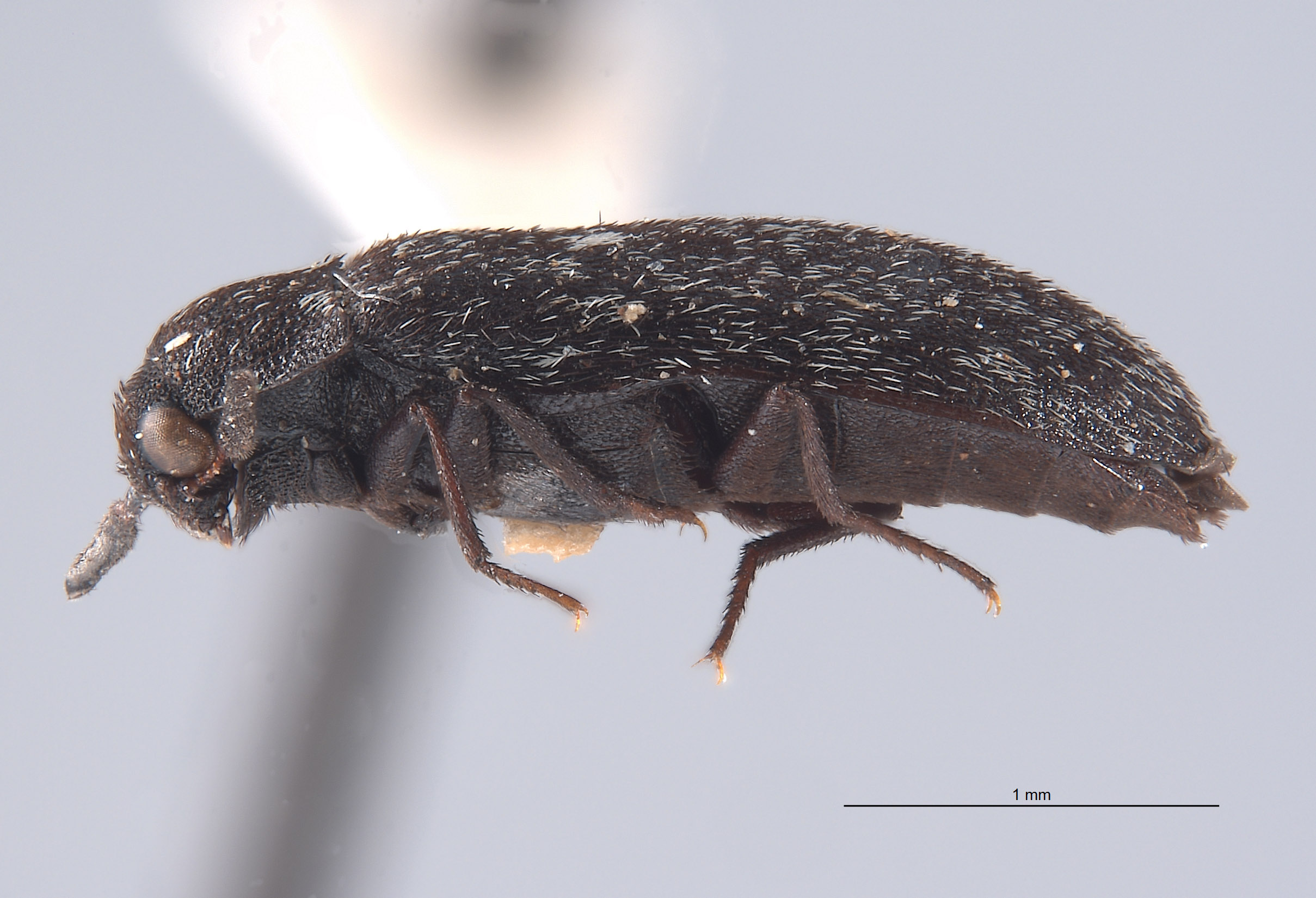
- Lateral image

Scientific classification
- Domain: Eukaryota
- Kingdom: Animalia
- Phylum: Arthropoda
- Class: Insecta
- Order: Coleoptera
- Suborder: Polyphaga
- Family: Dermestidae
- Genus: Megatoma
- Species: M. pubescens

Binomial name
- Megatoma pubescens (Zetterstedt, 1828)

= Megatoma pubescens =

Species of beetle

Megatoma pubescens is a species of carpet beetle in the family Dermestidae. It is found in North America and Europe.

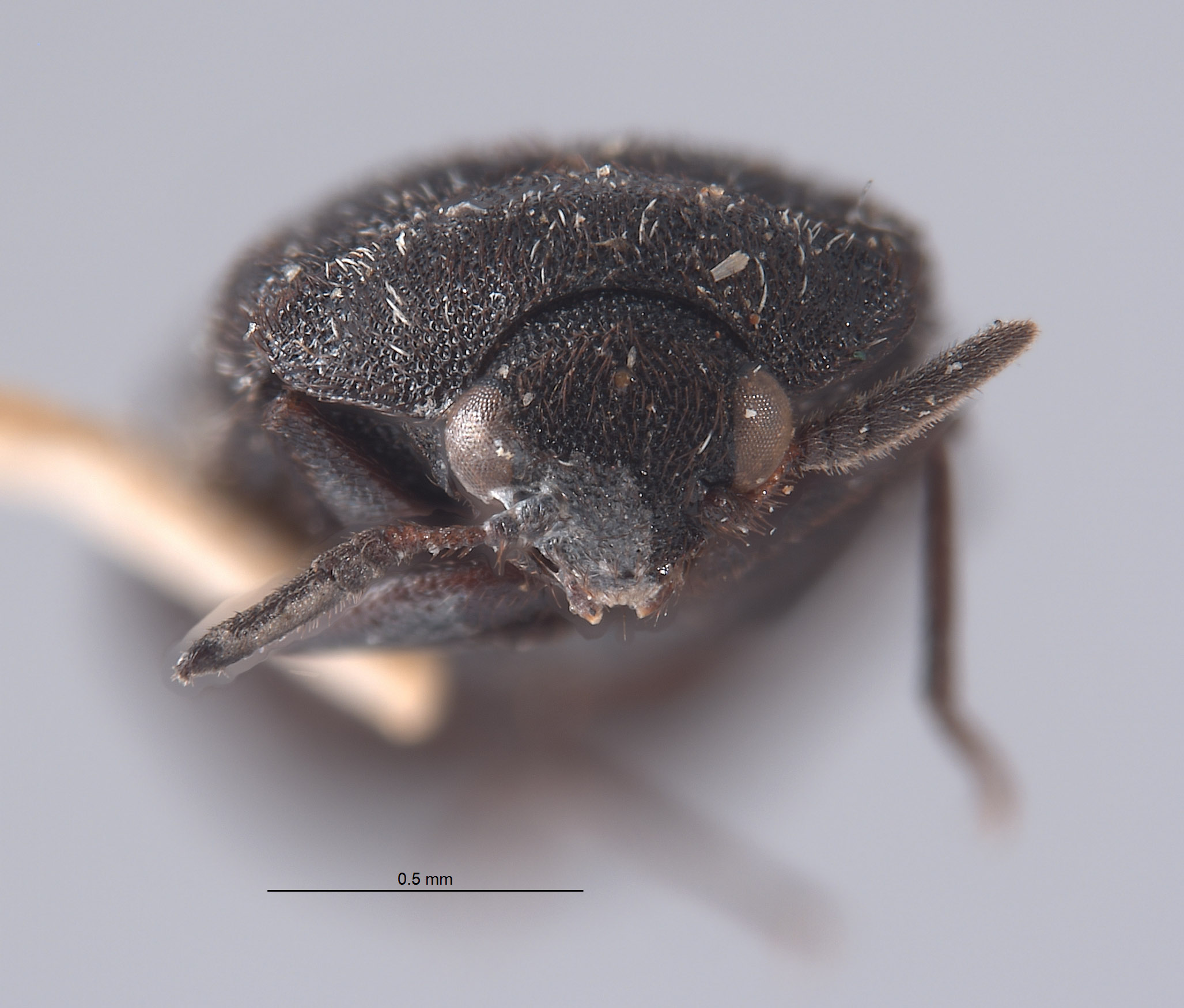
Adult Megatoma pubescens. Head view
