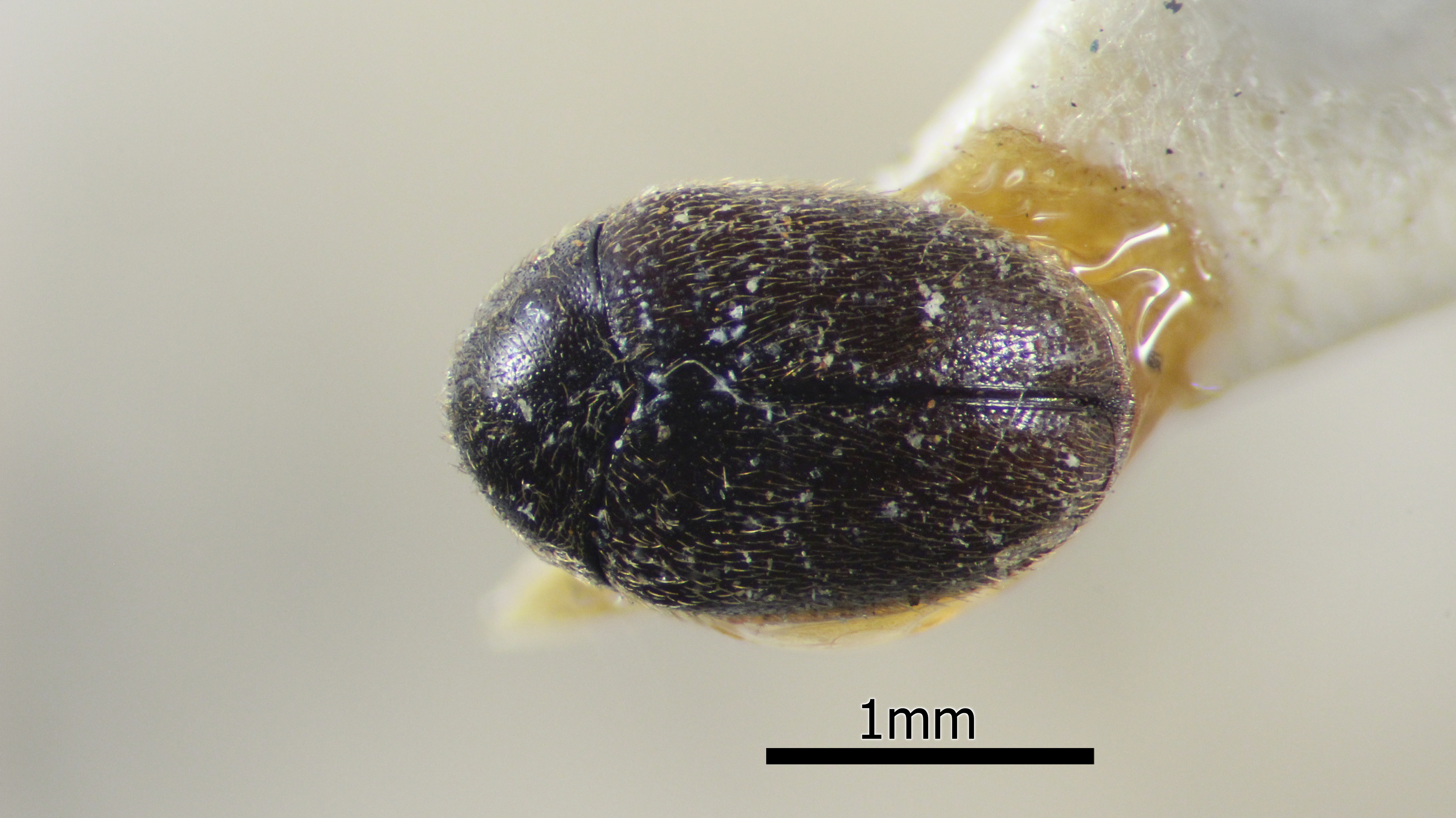
- Orphinus minor

Scientific classification
- Kingdom: Animalia
- Phylum: Arthropoda
- Class: Insecta
- Order: Coleoptera
- Suborder: Polyphaga
- Family: Dermestidae
- Genus: Orphinus
- Species: O. minor

Binomial name
- Orphinus minor Arrow, 1915

Synonyms
- Orphinus horni Pic, 1927

= Orphinus minor =

Species of beetle

Orphinus minor is a species of skin beetle found in India and Sri Lanka.
