= Evorinea hirtella =

Scientific classification
- Kingdom: Animalia
- Phylum: Arthropoda
- Class: Insecta
- Order: Coleoptera
- Suborder: Polyphaga
- Family: Dermestidae
- Genus: Evorinea
- Species: E. hirtella

Binomial name
- Evorinea hirtella (Walker, 1858)

Synonyms
- Trinodes hirtellus Walker, 1858

Species of beetle

Evorinea hirtella, is a species of skin beetle found in India, Malaysia, Nepal, and Sri Lanka.

It is a minor pest on cinnamon.
