= Sefrania =

Scientific classification
- Kingdom: Animalia
- Phylum: Arthropoda
- Class: Insecta
- Order: Coleoptera
- Suborder: Polyphaga
- Family: Dermestidae
- Subfamily: Attageninae
- Genus: Sefrania; Pic, 1899

Genus of beetles

Sefrania is a genus of beetles in the family Dermestidae, containing the following species:

- Sefrania bleusei Pic, 1899
- Sefrania sabulorum (Beal, 1984)
