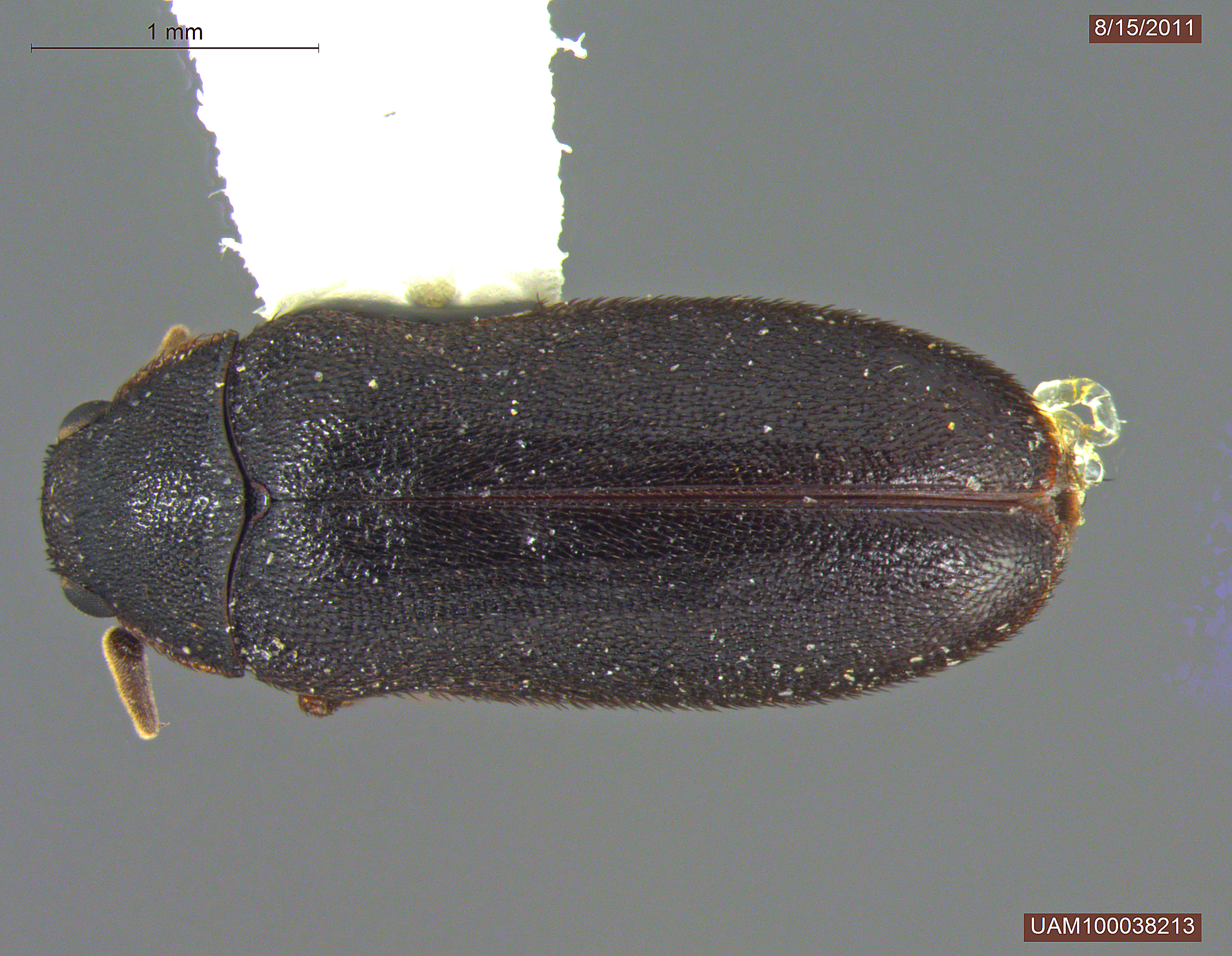

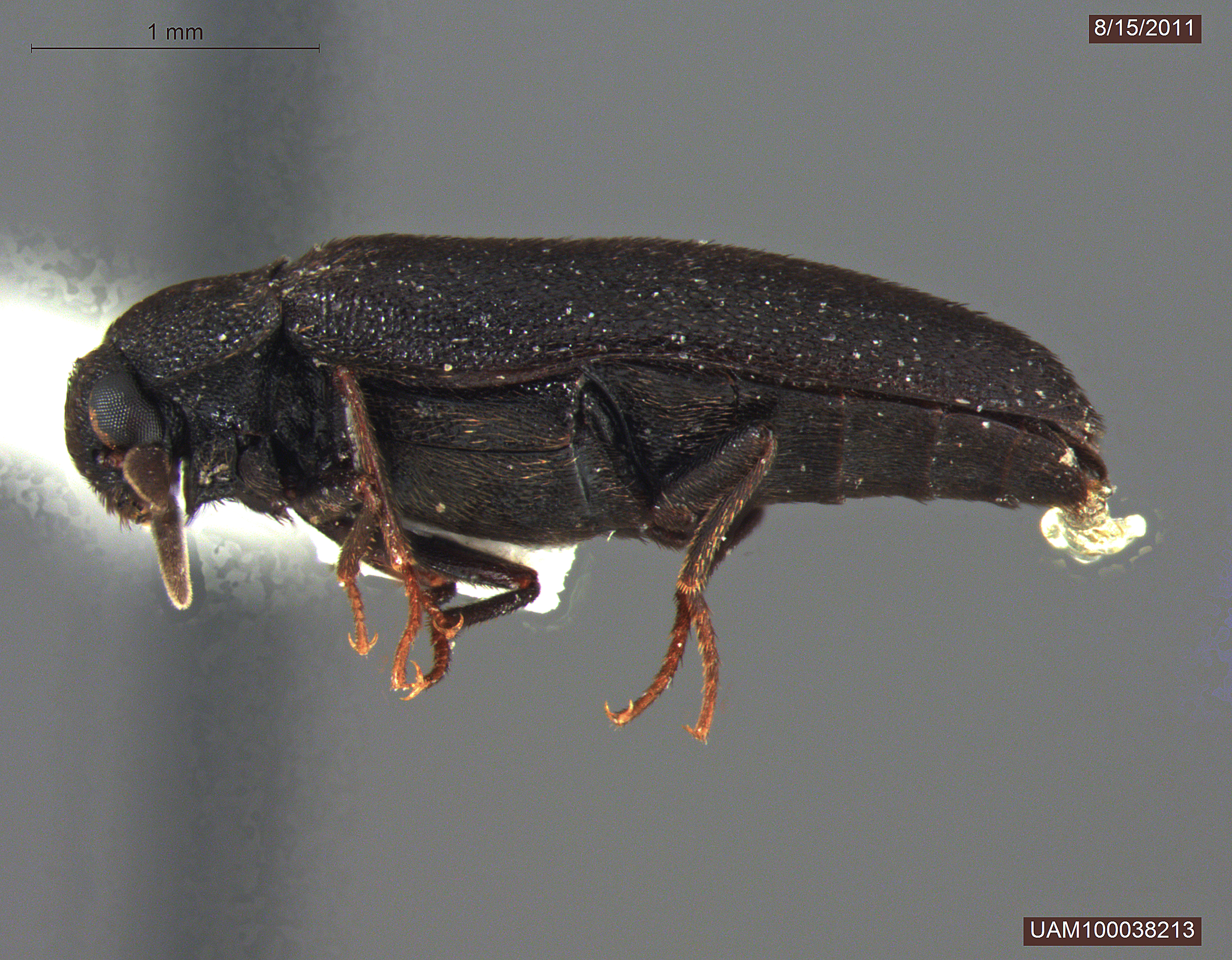

Scientific classification
- Domain: Eukaryota
- Kingdom: Animalia
- Phylum: Arthropoda
- Class: Insecta
- Order: Coleoptera
- Suborder: Polyphaga
- Family: Dermestidae
- Subtribe: Megatomina
- Genus: Megatoma
- Species: M. perversa

Binomial name
- Megatoma perversa (Fall, 1926)

= Megatoma perversa =

Species of beetle

Megatoma perversa is a species of carpet beetle in the family Dermestidae. It is found in North America.
