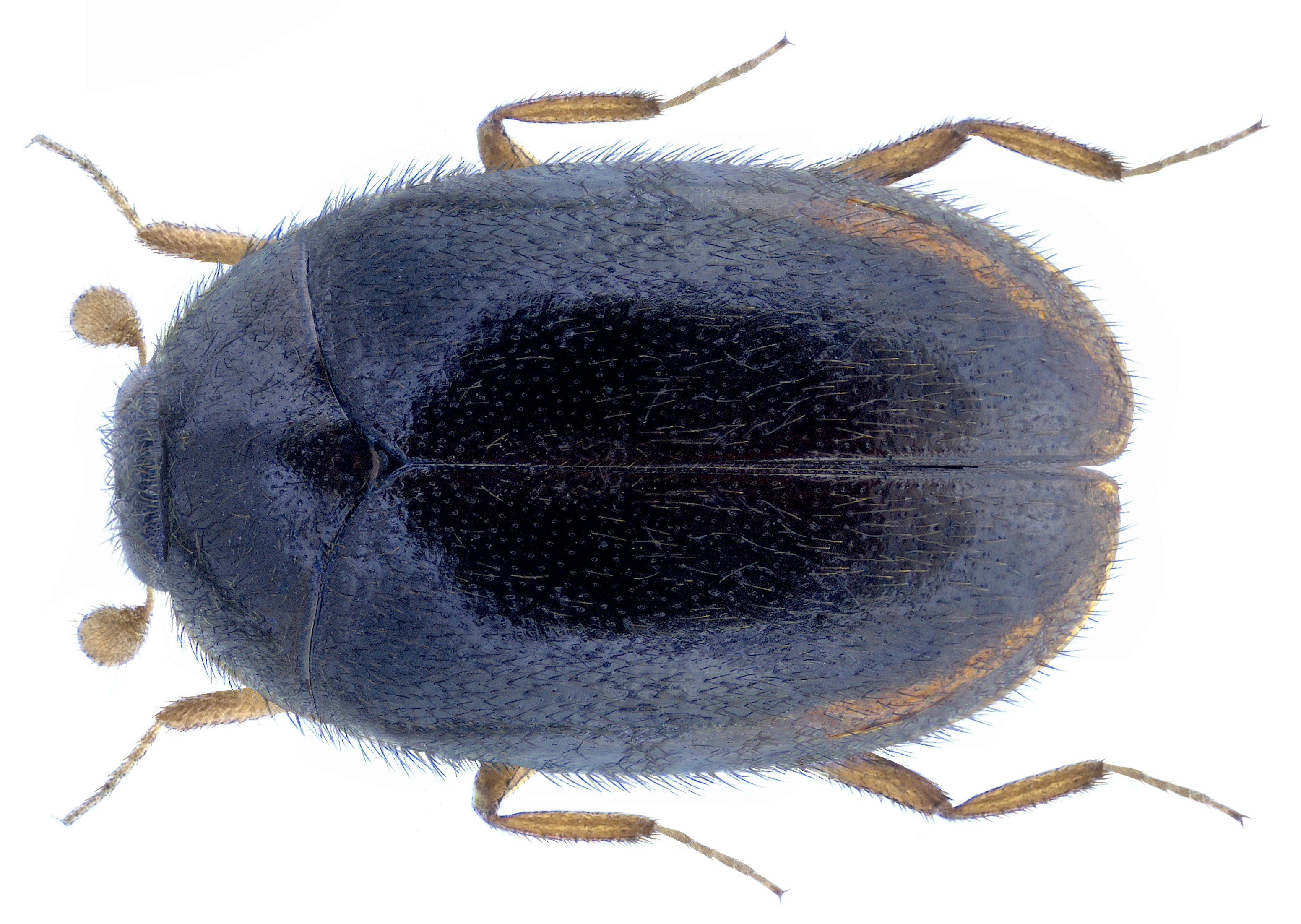

Scientific classification
- Kingdom: Animalia
- Phylum: Arthropoda
- Clade: Pancrustacea
- Class: Insecta
- Order: Coleoptera
- Suborder: Polyphaga
- Family: Dermestidae
- Genus: Orphinus
- Species: O. fulvipes

Binomial name
- Orphinus fulvipes (Guérin-Méneville, 1838)

Synonyms
- Attagenus? defectus Walker, 1858; Orphinus defectus Arrow, 1915

= Orphinus fulvipes =

Species of beetle

Orphinus fulvipes is a species of carpet beetle in the family Dermestidae. It is found in North America, South Asia, Oceania, and Europe.

== Description ==
Total body length is 2.5 mm.
