= Orphinus =

Scientific classification
- Kingdom: Animalia
- Phylum: Arthropoda
- Clade: Pancrustacea
- Class: Insecta
- Order: Coleoptera
- Suborder: Polyphaga
- Family: Dermestidae
- Subfamily: Megatominae
- Tribe: Megatomini
- Subtribe: Orphinina
- Genus: Orphinus; Motschulsky, 1858

Genus of beetles

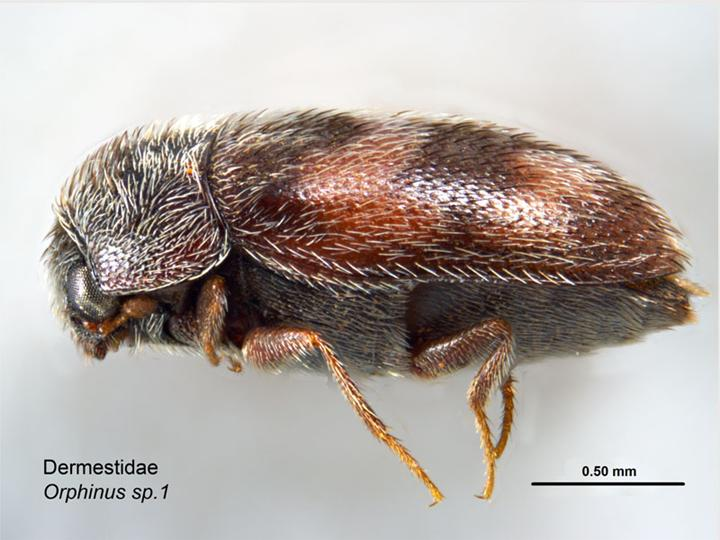
Orphinus sp. collected at Barrow Island

Orphinus is a genus of beetles in the family Dermestidae, the skin beetles. The genus is distributed in Africa, Asia, and the Australian region, especially in tropical areas; at least one species is cosmopolitan. There are about 88 species.

Species include:

- Orphinus aethiops Arrow, 1915
- Orphinus affinis Reitter, 1881
- Orphinus africanus Pic, 1927
- Orphinus apicalis Pic, 1918
- Orphinus apicebrunneus Háva, 2003
- Orphinus atrofasciatus Pic, 1916
- Orphinus atrous Armstrong, 1943
- Orphinus australicus Blackburn, 1891
- Orphinus bicolor Pic, 1954
- Orphinus biflexus Reitter, 1881
- Orphinus binotatus Pic, 1937
- Orphinus bipunctutus Matsumura & Yokoyama, 1928
- Orphinus biroi Pic, 1956
- Orphinus casuarinae Blackburn, 1903
- Orphinus ceciliense Blackburn, 1903
- Orphinus chinensis Háva, 2004
- Orphinus congoanus Pic, 1950
- Orphinus conjunctus Pic, 1937
- Orphinus convexus Pic, 1956
- Orphinus defectus Walker, 1858
- Orphinus demeyeri Háva, 2003
- Orphinus diversus Pic, 1928
- Orphinus fasciatus Matsumura & Yokoyama, 1928
- Orphinus fouqueti Pic, 1937
- Orphinus fulvipes Guérin-Méneville, 1838
- Orphinus funestus Arrow, 1915
- Orphinus globulicornis Reitter, 1908
- Orphinus guernei Pic, 1916
- Orphinus haemorrhoidalis Motschulsky, 1858
- Orphinus hartmanni Háva, 2001
- Orphinus horni Pic, 1927
- Orphinus incognitus Háva, 2003
- Orphinus infasciatus Pic, 1926
- Orphinus interioris Blackburn, 1891
- Orphinus japonicus Arrow, 1915
- Orphinus jiri Háva, 2001
- Orphinus jucundus Arrow, 1915
- Orphinus kabateki Háva, 2007
- Orphinus katerina Háva, 2001
- Orphinus kejvali Háva, 2006
- Orphinus kenyensis Kalík, 1965
- Orphinus kresli Háva, 2003
- Orphinus malabarensis Pic, 1916
- Orphinus mediojunctus Pic, 1938
- Orphinus minimus Arrow, 1915
- Orphinus minor Arrow, 1915
- Orphinus mroczkowskii Háva & Kadej, 2006
- Orphinus nealense Blackburn, 1903
- Orphinus nesioticus Beal, 1961
- Orphinus nilgirensis Arrow, 1915
- Orphinus notaticollis Pic, 1916
- Orphinus obliteratus Pic, 1927
- Orphinus occidentalis Armstrong, 1943
- Orphinus okinawanus Háva, 2006
- Orphinus orientalis Motschulsky, 1851
- Orphinus oscitans Olliff, 1883
- Orphinus ovalis Arrow, 1915
- Orphinus pedestris Motschulsky, 1858
- Orphinus pseudoovalis Háva, 2004
- Orphinus quadrimaculatus Matsumura & Yokoyama, 1928
- Orphinus quornensis Blackburn, 1895
- Orphinus rufofasciatus Pic, 1924
- Orphinus rusumoensis Háva & Herrmann, 2003
- Orphinus sexmaculatus Arrow, 1915
- Orphinus sikkimensis Háva & Herrmann, 2004
- Orphinus subfasciatus Pic, 1927
- Orphinus tabitha Arrow, 1915
- Orphinus tadzhicus Zhantiev, 1975
- Orphinus terminalis Sharp in Blackburn & Sharp, 1885
- Orphinus testaceipes Pic, 1915
- Orphinus tonkineus Pic, 1922
- Orphinus unifasciatus Háva, 2006
- Orphinus wagneri Háva & Herrmann, 2003
- Orphinus woodvillensis Blackburn, 1891
- Orphinus yunnanus Háva, 2004
- Orphinus zomba Háva & Herrmann, 2002
