= Trichodryas =

Scientific classification
- Kingdom: Animalia
- Phylum: Arthropoda
- Class: Insecta
- Order: Coleoptera
- Suborder: Polyphaga
- Family: Dermestidae
- Subfamily: Trinodinae
- Genus: Trichodryas; Lawrence & Slipinski, 2005
- Species: T. esoterica

Binomial name
- Trichodryas esoterica Lawrence & Slipinski, 2005

Species of beetle

Trichodryas esoterica is a species of beetle in the family Dermestidae, the only species in the genus Trichodryas.
