= Apsectus =

Scientific classification
- Kingdom: Animalia
- Phylum: Arthropoda
- Class: Insecta
- Order: Coleoptera
- Suborder: Polyphaga
- Family: Dermestidae
- Subfamily: Trinodinae
- Tribe: Trinodini
- Genus: Apsectus; LeConte, 1854

Genus of beetles

Apsectus is a genus of beetles in the family Dermestidae, containing the following species:

- Apsectus araneorum Beal, 1959
- Apsectus centralis Sharp, 1902
- Apsectus dichromus Beal, 1959
- Apsectus hispidus Melsheimer, 1844
- Apsectus hystrix Sharp, 1902
- Apsectus mexicanus (Reitter, 1881)
- Apsectus minutus Sharp, 1902
- Apsectus obscurus Sharp, 1902
