= Trogoparvus =

Scientific classification
- Kingdom: Animalia
- Phylum: Arthropoda
- Class: Insecta
- Order: Coleoptera
- Suborder: Polyphaga
- Family: Dermestidae
- Genus: Trogoparvus; Háva, 2001

Genus of beetles

Trogoparvus is a genus of beetles in the family Dermestidae, containing the following species:

- Trogoparvus sulcatopygus Pic, 1927
- Trogoparvus sumatrensis Háva, 2001
