= Trinodes emarginatus =

Scientific classification
- Kingdom: Animalia
- Phylum: Arthropoda
- Class: Insecta
- Order: Coleoptera
- Suborder: Polyphaga
- Family: Dermestidae
- Genus: Thaumaglossa
- Species: T. emarginatus

Binomial name
- Thaumaglossa emarginatus Arrow, 1915

Synonyms
- Trinodes guernei Pic, 1915; Trinodes carinatus Pic, 1916

Species of beetle

Trinodes emarginatus, is a species of skin beetle found in India and Sri Lanka.

== Description ==
Total body length is about 2 mm. Pronotum and elytra light brown.
