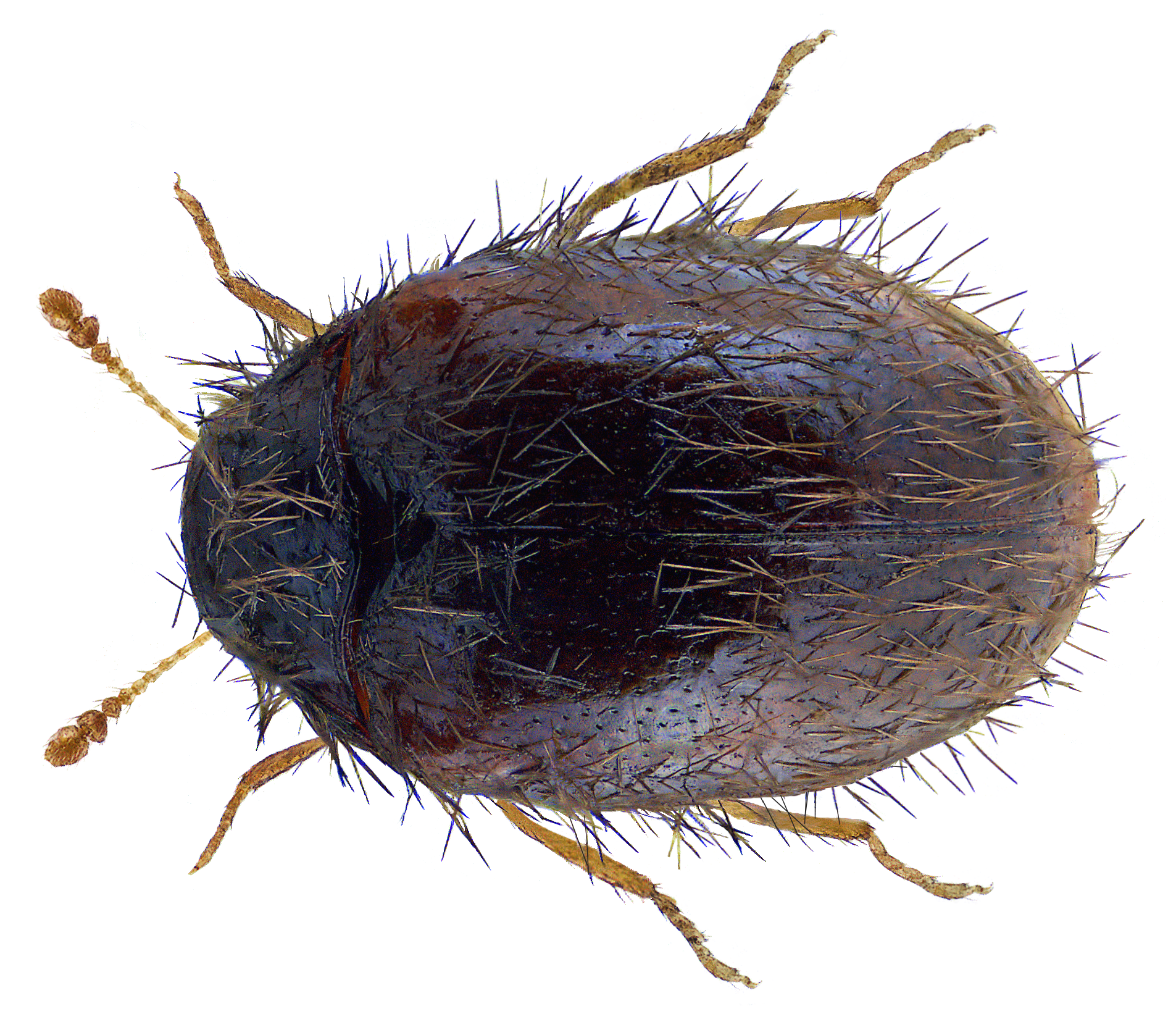
- Trinodes hirtus

Scientific classification
- Kingdom: Animalia
- Phylum: Arthropoda
- Class: Insecta
- Order: Coleoptera
- Suborder: Polyphaga
- Family: Dermestidae
- Tribe: Trinodini
- Genus: Trinodes; Dejean, 1821

= Trinodes =

Genus of beetles

Trinodes is a genus of beetles in the family Dermestidae, the skin beetles. The genus is distributed in the Palearctic, Oriental, and Afrotropical realms. There are about 16 species.

Species include:

- Trinodes albohirsutus Kalík, 1965
- Trinodes amamiensis Ohbayashi, 1977
- Trinodes carinatus Pic, 1916
- Trinodes cinereohirtus Motschulsky, 1863
- Trinodes emarginatus Arrow, 1915
- Trinodes hirtus Fabricius, 1781
- Trinodes insulanus Zhantiev, 1988
- Trinodes minutus Pic, 1915
- Trinodes niger Matsumura & Yokoyama, 1928
- Trinodes puetzi Háva & Prokop, 2006
- Trinodes rufescens Reitter, 1877
- Trinodes rufithorax Pic, 1926
- Trinodes senegalensis Pic, 1915
- Trinodes sinensis Fairmaire, 1886
- Trinodes tonkineus Pic, 1922
- Trinodes villosulus Dahl, 1823
