= Ranolus =

Scientific classification
- Kingdom: Animalia
- Phylum: Arthropoda
- Class: Insecta
- Order: Coleoptera
- Suborder: Polyphaga
- Family: Dermestidae
- Subfamily: Orphilinae
- Tribe: Ranolini; Háva, 2014
- Genus: Ranolus (Blair, 1929)

Type species
- Ranolus cavernicola (Blair, 1929)

Synonyms
- Orphilodes Lawrence & Slipinski, 2005

Genus of beetles

Ranolus is a genus of beetles in the family Dermestidae from Southeast Asia and Oceania. It was originally described as a subgenus of Attagenus, containing only the species Ranolus cavernicola. It was later found to be a separate genus, and was placed in its own tribe, Ranolini, along with Orphilodes. A second species, Ranolus tenebricola, was described by Jiří Háva in 2014. Orphilodes was later synonymized with Ranolus.

== Species ==
Ranolus contains the following seven species:

- Ranolus australis (Lawrence & Ślipiński, 2005) — Australia
- Ranolus caledonicus Háva, 2017 — New Caledonia
- Ranolus cavernicola (Blair, 1929) — Malaysia
- Ranolus malleecola (Lawrence & Ślipiński, 2005) — Australia
- Ranolus minor (Lawrence & Ślipiński, 2005) — Australia
- Ranolus papuanus (Háva, 2015) — Papua New Guinea
- Ranolus tenebricola Háva, 2014 — Thailand
