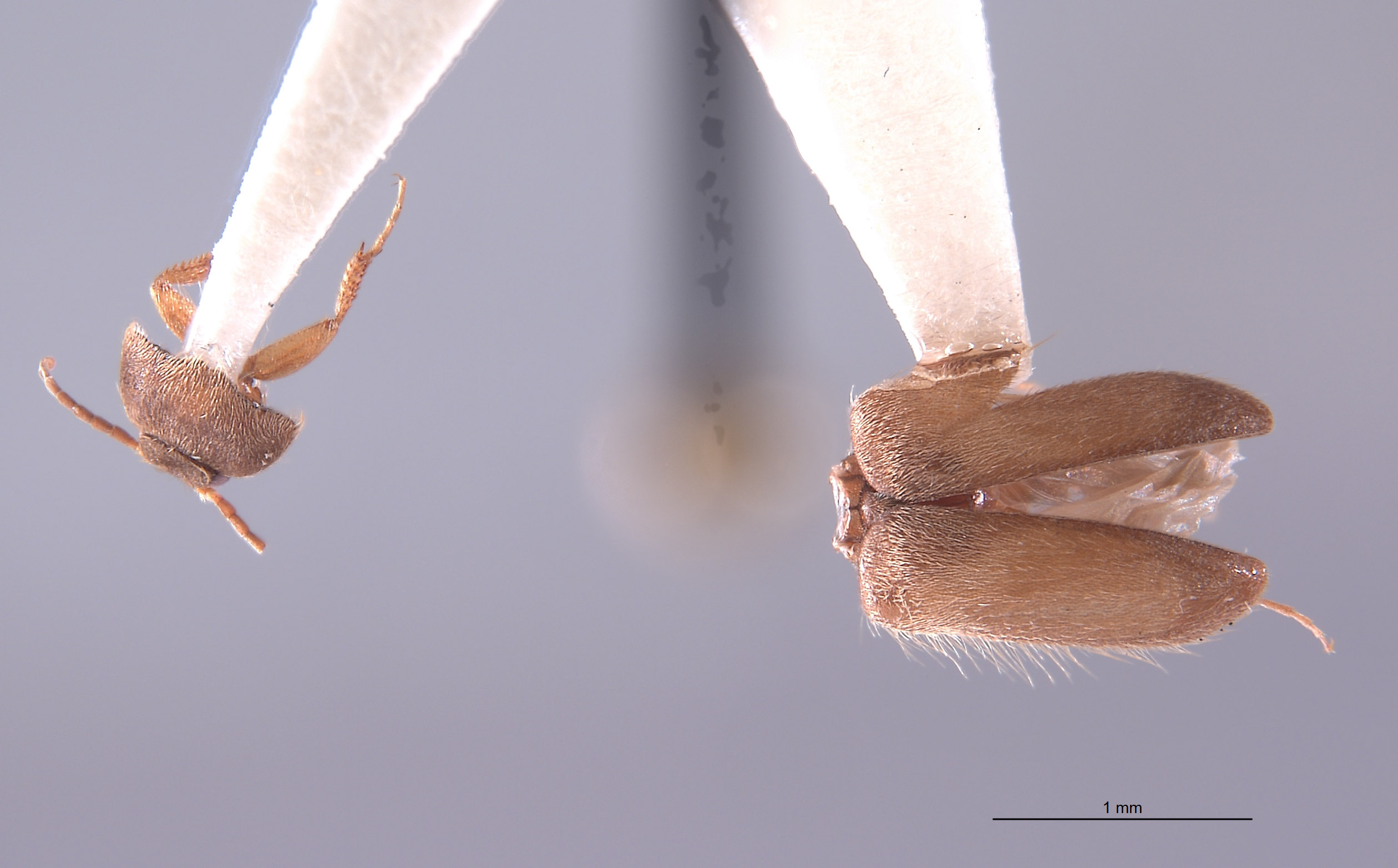
- Dorsal image
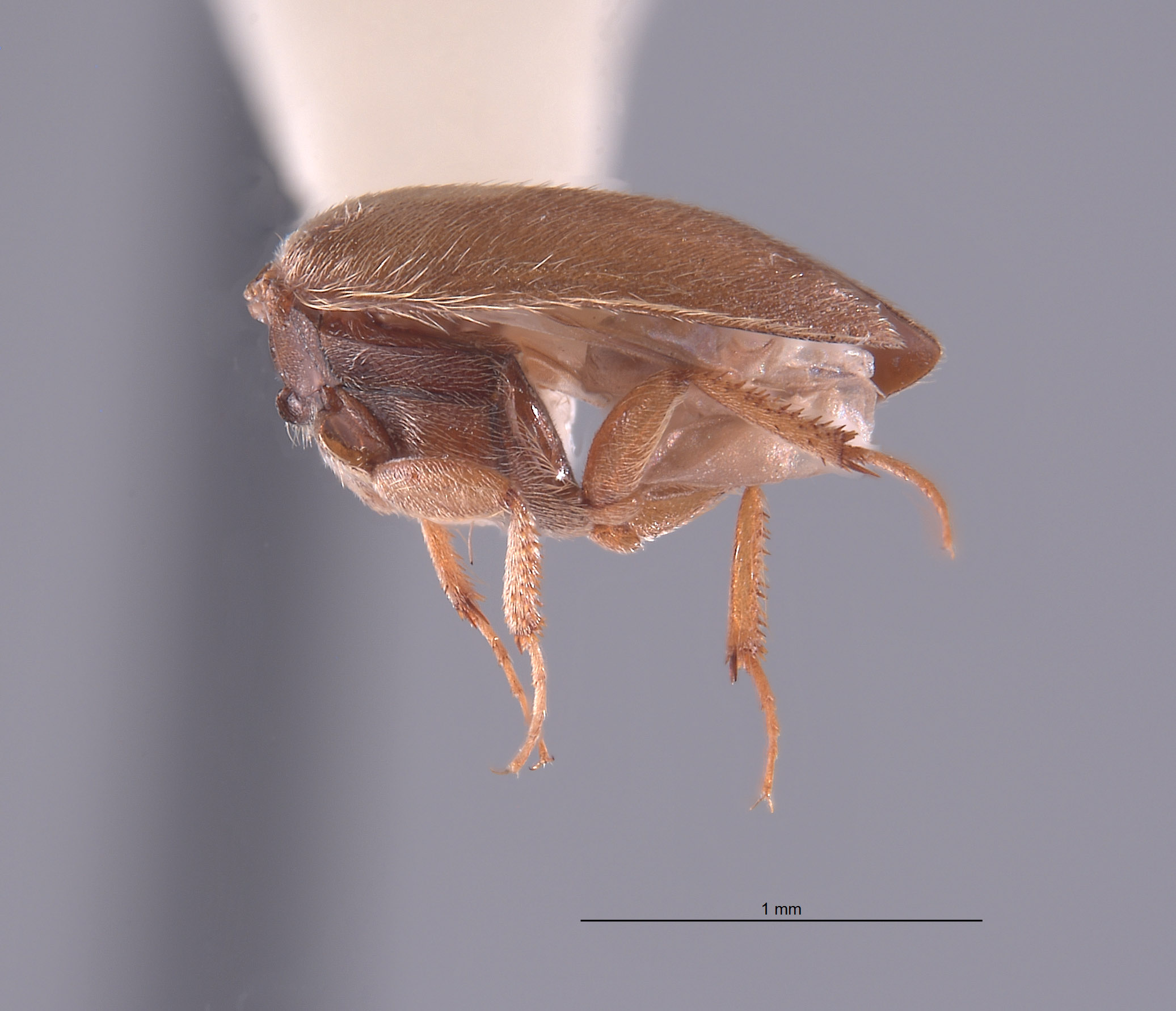
- Lateral image

Scientific classification
- Domain: Eukaryota
- Kingdom: Animalia
- Phylum: Arthropoda
- Class: Insecta
- Order: Coleoptera
- Suborder: Polyphaga
- Family: Dermestidae
- Genus: Apphianus
- Species: A. yuccae

Binomial name
- Apphianus yuccae Beal, 2005

= Apphianus =

Species of beetle

Apphianus yuccae is a species of beetles in the family Dermestidae, the only species in the genus Apphianus. Present in United States (only records known are in state California).

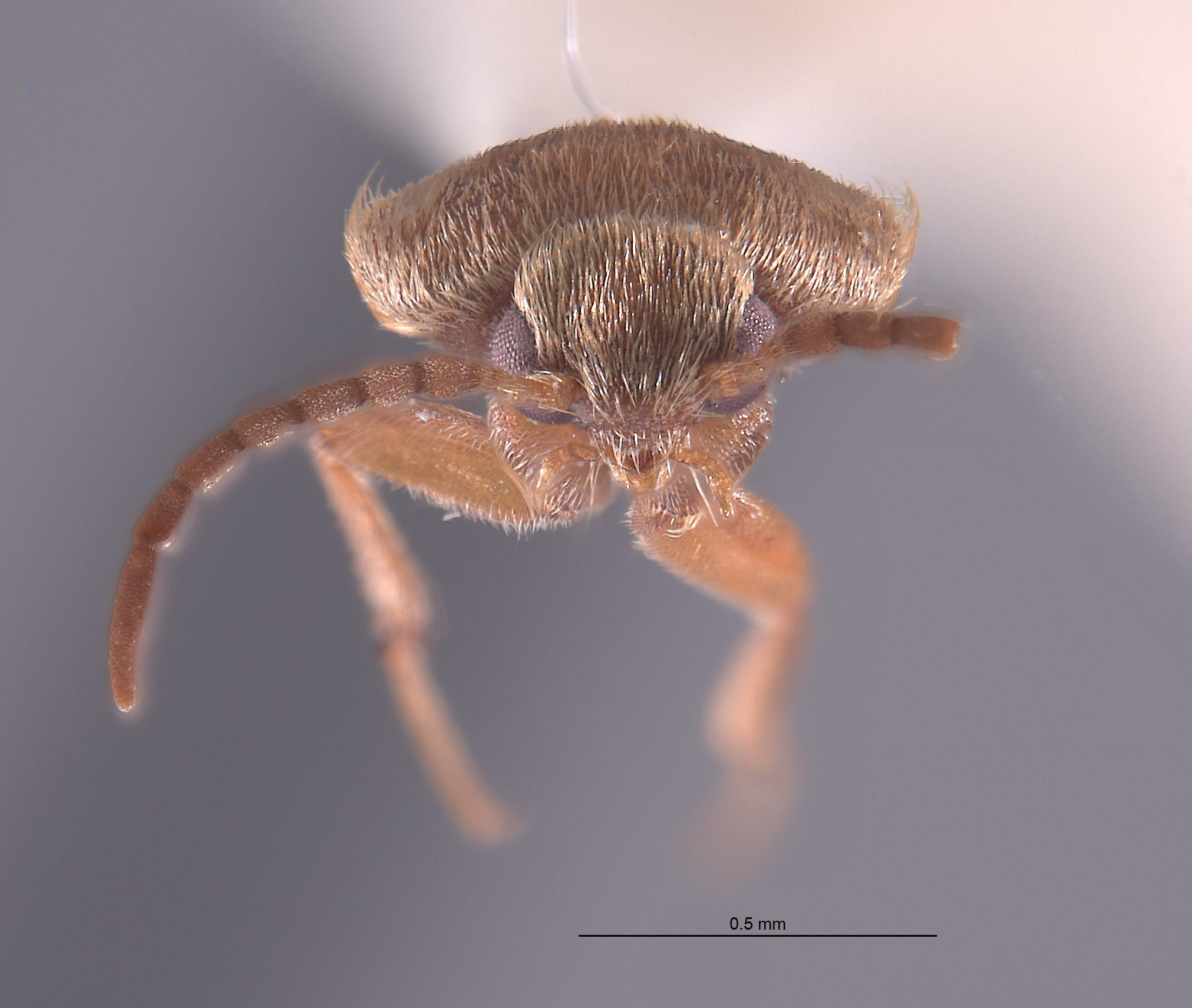
Adult Apphianus yuccae. Head view
