= Orphinus guernei =

Scientific classification
- Kingdom: Animalia
- Phylum: Arthropoda
- Class: Insecta
- Order: Coleoptera
- Suborder: Polyphaga
- Family: Dermestidae
- Genus: Orphinus
- Species: O. guernei

Binomial name
- Orphinus guernei Pic, 1916

Synonyms
- Orphinus (Orphinus) guernei Mroczkowski, 1968; Orphinus (Orphinus) guernei Háva, 2003

Species of beetle

Orphinus guernei is a species of skin beetle found in Sri Lanka.

== Description ==
Total body length is about 2.5 mm.
