= Volvicornis =

Volvicornis rufescens

Scientific classification
- Kingdom: Animalia
- Phylum: Arthropoda
- Class: Insecta
- Order: Coleoptera
- Suborder: Polyphaga
- Family: Dermestidae
- Genus: Volvicornis; Háva & Kalík, 2004
- Species: V. rufescens

Binomial name
- Volvicornis rufescens (Pic, 1927)

Species of beetle

Volvicornis rufescens is a species of beetle in the family Dermestidae, the only species in the genus Volvicornis.
