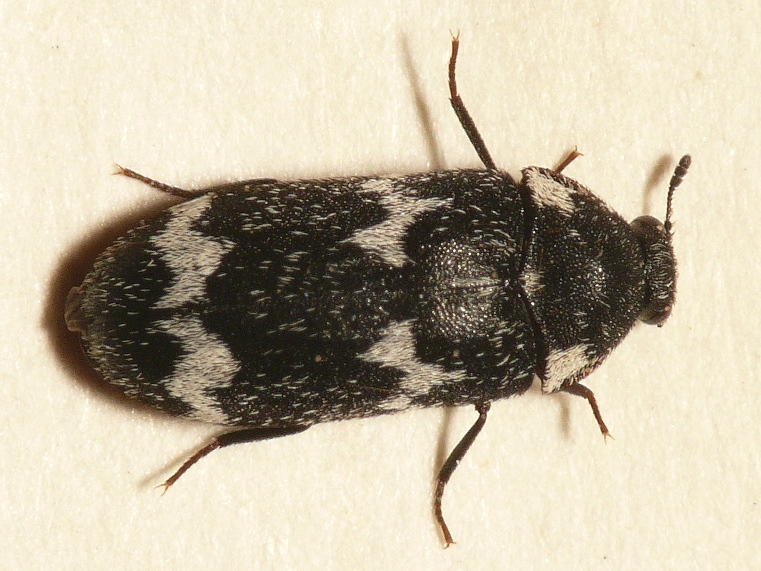
- Megatoma undata, a common species in Europe

Scientific classification
- Kingdom: Animalia
- Phylum: Arthropoda
- Class: Insecta
- Order: Coleoptera
- Suborder: Polyphaga
- Family: Dermestidae
- Subtribe: Megatomina
- Genus: Megatoma; Herbst, 1792

= Megatoma =

Genus of beetles

Megatoma is a genus of beetle native to the Palearctic (including Europe), the Near East and the Nearctic.

Species include:

- Megatoma ampla (Casey, 1900)
- Megatoma angularis (Mannerheim, 1853)
- Megatoma belfragei LeConte, 1874
- Megatoma conspersa Solsky, 1876
- Megatoma cylindrica Kirby, 1837
- Megatoma dolia Beal, 1967
- Megatoma electra Zhantiev, 2006
- Megatoma falsa Horn, 1875
- Megatoma friebi Pic, 1938
- Megatoma giffardi Blaisdell, 1927
- Megatoma graeseri Reitter, 1887
- Megatoma indica Háva, 2000
- Megatoma kaliki Beal, 1967
- Megatoma leucochlidon Beal, 1967
- Megatoma perversa Fall, 1926
- Megatoma polia Beal, 1967
- Megatoma pubescens Zetterstedt, 1828
- Megatoma riedeli Mroczkowski, 1967
- Megatoma ruficornis Aubé, 1866
- Megatoma tianschanica Sokolov, 1972
- Megatoma trichorhopalum Beal, 1967
- Megatoma trogodermoides Beal, 1967
- Megatoma undata Linnaeus, 1758
- Megatoma variegata Horn, 1875
