= Orphilinae =

Scientific classification
- Kingdom: Animalia
- Phylum: Arthropoda
- Clade: Pancrustacea
- Class: Insecta
- Order: Coleoptera
- Suborder: Polyphaga
- Family: Dermestidae
- Subfamily: Orphilinae; LeConte, 1861

Tribes and genera
- Tribe Orphinini; Genus Orphilus; Tribe Ranolini; Genus Orphilodes; Genus Ranolus

Subfamily of beetles

Orphilinae is a subfamily of beetles that includes three genera: Orphilodes, Orphilus and Ranolus. It was described by John Lawrence LeConte in 1861.
