= Adelaidia =

Scientific classification
- Kingdom: Animalia
- Phylum: Arthropoda
- Class: Insecta
- Order: Coleoptera
- Suborder: Polyphaga
- Family: Dermestidae
- Genus: Adelaidia; Blackburn, 1891

Genus of beetles

Adelaidia is a genus of beetles in the family Dermestidae, containing the following species:

- Adelaidia haucki Háva, 2000
- Adelaidia rigua Blackburn, 1891
- Adelaidia rufa Háva, 2002
- Adelaidia unicolor Mroczkowski, 1966
