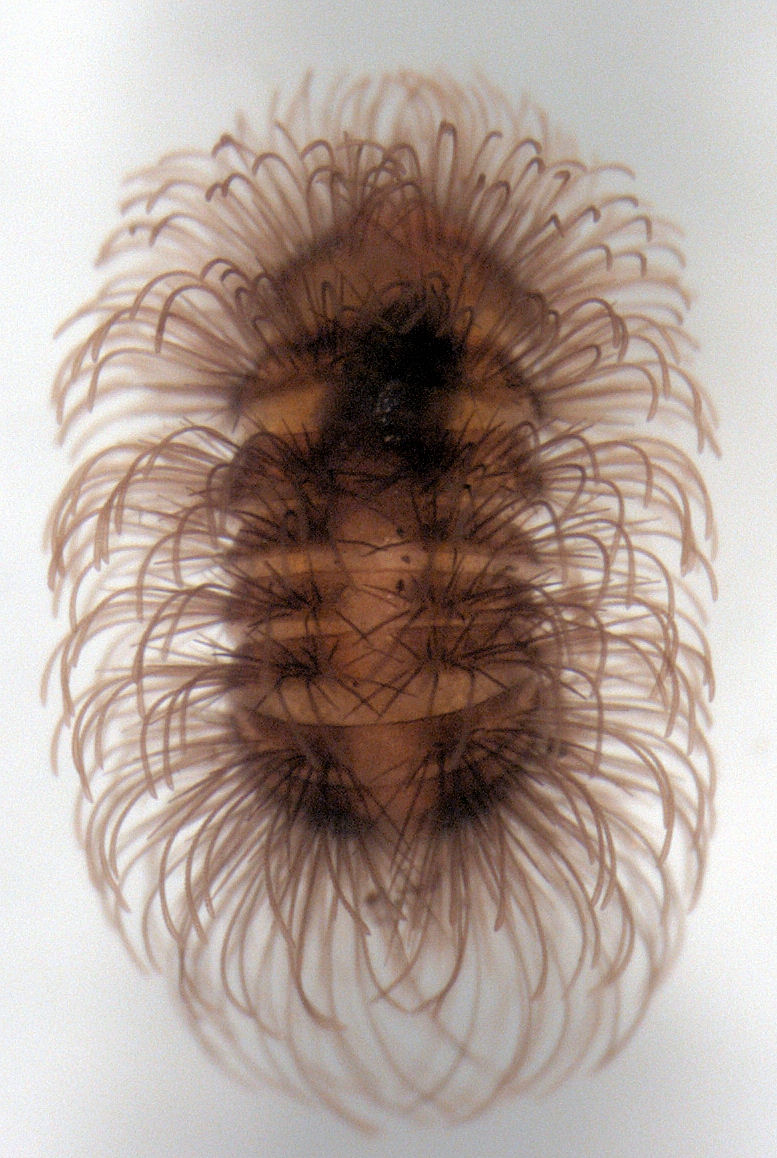
- Hexanodes vulgata'

Scientific classification
- Kingdom: Animalia
- Phylum: Arthropoda
- Class: Insecta
- Order: Coleoptera
- Suborder: Polyphaga
- Family: Dermestidae
- Genus: Hexanodes; Blair, 1941
- Species: H. vulgata

Binomial name
- Hexanodes vulgata (Broun, 1880)

= Hexanodes =

Hexanodes vulgata

Species of beetle

Hexanodes vulgata is a species of beetles in the family Dermestidae, the only species in the genus Hexanodes.
