= Evorinea =

Scientific classification
- Kingdom: Animalia
- Phylum: Arthropoda
- Class: Insecta
- Order: Coleoptera
- Suborder: Polyphaga
- Family: Dermestidae
- Genus: Evorinea; Beal, 1961

Genus of beetles

Evorinea is a genus of beetles in the family Dermestidae, containing the following species:

- Evorinea bicolorata Pic, 1939
- Evorinea curta Pic, 1894
- Evorinea flava Motschulsky, 1863
- Evorinea hirtella Walker, 1858
- Evorinea indica Arrow, 1915
- Evorinea iota Arrow, 1915
- Evorinea madagascarica Háva, 2002
- Evorinea marie Háva, 2005
- Evorinea rufotestacea Pic, 1952
- Evorinea villosa Boheman, 1851
