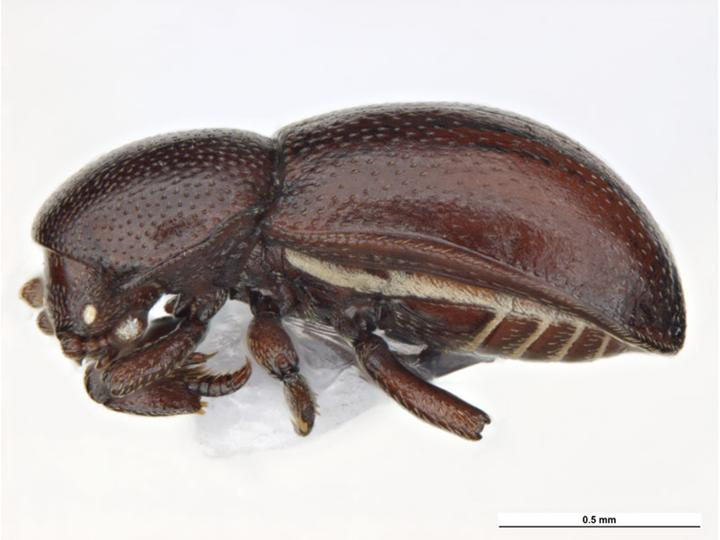

Scientific classification
- Kingdom: Animalia
- Phylum: Arthropoda
- Class: Insecta
- Order: Coleoptera
- Suborder: Polyphaga
- Family: Dermestidae
- Genus: Thorictodes; Reitter, 1875

= Thorictodes =

Genus of beetles

Thorictodes is a genus of beetles in the family Dermestidae, the skin beetles.

There are five species.

Species include:

- Thorictodes bennetti John, 1961
- Thorictodes brevipennis Zhang & Liu in Liu & Zhang, 1986
- Thorictodes dartevellei John, 1961
- Thorictodes erraticus Champion, 1922
- Thorictodes heydeni Reitter, 1875
