= Macrothorictus =

Scientific classification
- Kingdom: Animalia
- Phylum: Arthropoda
- Class: Insecta
- Order: Coleoptera
- Suborder: Polyphaga
- Family: Dermestidae
- Genus: Macrothorictus; Andreae, 1967

Genus of beetles

Macrothorictus is a genus of beetles in the family Dermestidae, containing the following species:

- Macrothorictus braunsi Andreae, 1967
- Macrothorictus kalaharicus Andreae, 1967
- Macrothorictus kochi Andreae, 1967
- Macrothorictus longitarsis Andreae, 1967
- Macrothorictus majusculus (Péringuey, 1886)
- Macrothorictus salinus Andreae, 1967
