= Trinoparvus =

Scientific classification
- Kingdom: Animalia
- Phylum: Arthropoda
- Class: Insecta
- Order: Coleoptera
- Suborder: Polyphaga
- Family: Dermestidae
- Genus: Trinoparvus; Háva, 2004

Genus of beetles

Trinoparvus is a genus of beetles in the family Dermestidae, containing the following species:

- Trinoparvus laboriosus Háva, 2004
- Trinoparvus majeri Háva, 2014
- Trinoparvus suturalis Háva, 2019
- Trinoparvus villosus Háva, 2004
