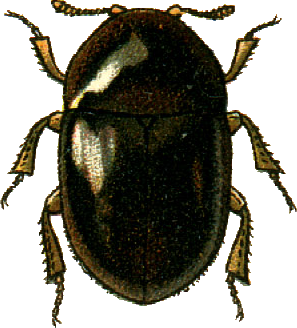

Scientific classification
- Kingdom: Animalia
- Phylum: Arthropoda
- Class: Insecta
- Order: Coleoptera
- Suborder: Polyphaga
- Family: Dermestidae
- Genus: Thorictus; Germar, 1834

= Thorictus =

Genus of beetles

Thorictus is a genus of beetles in the family Dermestidae, containing the following species:

- Thorictus algericus Pic, 1897
- Thorictus abyssinicus John, 1963
- Thorictus aequabilis John, 1965
- Thorictus andreinii Escalera, 1942
- Thorictus angustus John, 1964
- Thorictus babadjanidis John, 1971
- Thorictus bacunus John, 1971
- Thorictus basalis John, 1968
- Thorictus baudii Reitter, 1881
- Thorictus baudoni John, 1967
- Thorictus becharensis Chobaut, 1924
- Thorictus bengalensis Háva & Chakrovorty, 2024
- Thorictus beninensis Háva & Lackner, 2005
- Thorictus bifoveolatus Reitter, 1887
- Thorictus bonnairei Wasmann, 1894
- Thorictus braminus Wasmann, 1912
- Thorictus brevipennis John, 1963
- Thorictus buigasi Escalera, 1923
- Thorictus canariensis Wollaston, 1862
- Thorictus capensis Péringuey, 1886
- Thorictus castaneus Germar, 1834
- Thorictus ciliatus Reitter, 1881
- Thorictus cirenaicus John, 1965
- Thorictus cobosi John & Andreae, 1967
- Thorictus consimilis John, 1965
- Thorictus copticus John, 1963
- Thorictus crassus John, 1965
- Thorictus crinitus Andreae, 1967
- Thorictus deviedmai John, 1965
- Thorictus dilatipennis Reitter, 1881
- Thorictus dimidiatus Peyron, 1857
- Thorictus doderoi Escalera, 1942
- Thorictus doriae Escalera, 1942
- Thorictus ehlersii Perez, 1872
- Thorictus escalerai John, 1965
- Thorictus escorialanus John, 1965
- Thorictus fairmairei Raffray in Fairmaire & Raffray, 1873
- Thorictus feae Grouvelle, 1897
- Thorictus fiziensis John, 1961
- Thorictus foreli Wasmann, 1894
- Thorictus foveicollis Reitter, 1880
- Thorictus franzi John, 1967
- Thorictus fuhesanus John, 1964
- Thorictus gestroi Escalera, 1942
- Thorictus gigWollaston, 1862
- Thorictus grandiceps Pic, 1931
- Thorictus grandicollis Germar, 1842
- Thorictus hauseri John, 1965
- Thorictus heimi Wasmann, 1899
- Thorictus helleri John, 1963
- Thorictus hendeli Reitter, 1910
- Thorictus hilfi John, 1965
- Thorictus hoppi John, 1971
- Thorictus hottentotus Raffray, 1901
- Thorictus immutatus John, 1963
- Thorictus impressithorax Pic, 1930
- Thorictus incisicollis Pic, 1924
- Thorictus incultus John, 1971
- Thorictus indicus John, 1963
- Thorictus insulcatus Pic, 1924
- Thorictus irakensis John, 1963
- Thorictus kabulanus John, 1964
- Thorictus kandaharicus John, 1962
- Thorictus karoensis Andreae, 1967
- Thorictus kaznakovi R. Schmidt, 1904
- Thorictus khinjanus John, 1964
- Thorictus kifaruensis John, 1962
- Thorictus klapperichi John, 1964
- Thorictus kocheri John, 1965
- Thorictus kochi John, 1964
- Thorictus koenigi Reitter, 1887
- Thorictus kraatzi Wasmann, 1895
- Thorictus kurdistanus John, 1965
- Thorictus lederi Reitter, 1881
- Thorictus lethierryi Fairmaire, 1875
- Thorictus lindbergi John, 1963
- Thorictus longipennis Coye, 1869
- Thorictus lucasi John, 1965
- Thorictus lucusensis Escalera, 1923
- Thorictus manni Reichenspenger, 1926
- Thorictus marginicollis Schaum, 1859
- Thorictus marschalli John, 1963
- Thorictus martinsi Wasmann, 1925
- Thorictus mauritanicus Luc, 1846
- Thorictus mogadoricus Escalera, 1914
- Thorictus munganasti Reitter, 1908
- Thorictus myrmecophilus Reitter, 1881
- Thorictus nabeulanus John, 1964
- Thorictus namibensis John & Andreae, 1967
- Thorictus nanus John, 1964
- Thorictus nilgiriensis John, 1963
- Thorictus normandi Chobaut, 1924
- Thorictus obenbergeri John, 1965
- Thorictus olexai Háva, 2006
- Thorictus orientalis Peyron, 1857
- Thorictus ovalicollis Andreae, 1967
- Thorictus paganettii Obenberger, 1917
- Thorictus palmi John, 1964
- Thorictus parnassus John, 1971
- Thorictus pauciseta Wasmann, 1894
- Thorictus persicus Reitter, 1881
- Thorictus petranus John, 1965
- Thorictus peyerimhoffi Chobaut, 1904
- Thorictus pilosus Peyron, 1857
- Thorictus politus Wasmann, 1895
- Thorictus postangulus Reitter, 1895
- Thorictus procerus John, 1962
- Thorictus puncticollis Luc, 1846
- Thorictus punctithorax Reitter, 1860
- Thorictus quiquesulcatus John, 1964
- Thorictus rectangulatus John, 1965
- Thorictus reicherti Wasmann, 1912
- Thorictus reitteri John, 1963
- Thorictus rollei John, 1971
- Thorictus rotroui John, 1965
- Thorictus rotundithorax Escalera, 1942
- Thorictus ruzskii Semenov-Tian-Shanskiy, 1903
- Thorictus schatzmayri John, 1965
- Thorictus seriesetosus Fairmaire, 1870
- Thorictus sicilianus John, 1965
- Thorictus simillimus Escalera, 1914
- Thorictus simoni John, 1965
- Thorictus striatus Reitter, 1889
- Thorictus stricticollis Kraatz, 1859
- Thorictus studti John, 1971
- Thorictus subcastaneus Chobaut, 1898
- Thorictus subpusillus John, 1965
- Thorictus sulcicollis Perez Arc, 1868
- Thorictus tamadabanus John, 1964
- Thorictus tejedanus John & Andreae, 1967
- Thorictus tenerifanus John, 1965
- Thorictus testaceus Pic, 1930
- Thorictus theryi Chobaut, 1924
- Thorictus tripolitanus Escalera, 1942
- Thorictus trisulcatus Reitter, 1881
- Thorictus tuberosus Reitter, 1881
- Thorictus turneri John, 1963
- Thorictus ubanghiensis John, 1961
- Thorictus vaucheri Chobaut, 1924
- Thorictus vaulogeri Escalera, 1923
- Thorictus vestitus Wollaston, 1864
- Thorictus villosissimus Escalera, 1923
- Thorictus vonoertzeni John, 1971
- Thorictus walanganus John, 1964
- Thorictus wasmanni Reitter, 1895
- Thorictus wollastoni John, 1963
