= Mariouta =

Scientific classification
- Kingdom: Animalia
- Phylum: Arthropoda
- Class: Insecta
- Order: Coleoptera
- Suborder: Polyphaga
- Family: Dermestidae
- Genus: Mariouta; Pic, 1898

Genus of beetles

Mariouta is a genus of beetles in the family Dermestidae, containing

- Mariouta letourneuxi Pic, 1898
- Mariouta stangei Reitter, 1910
