= Afrothorictus =

Afrothorictus latus

Scientific classification
- Kingdom: Animalia
- Phylum: Arthropoda
- Class: Insecta
- Order: Coleoptera
- Suborder: Polyphaga
- Family: Dermestidae
- Genus: Afrothorictus; Andreae, 1967
- Species: A. latus

Binomial name
- Afrothorictus latus Andreae, 1967

Species of beetle

Afrothorictus latus is a species of beetle in the family Dermestidae, the only species in the genus Afrothorictus.
