= Trichelodes =

Trichelodes delicatula

Scientific classification
- Kingdom: Animalia
- Phylum: Arthropoda
- Class: Insecta
- Order: Coleoptera
- Suborder: Polyphaga
- Family: Dermestidae
- Genus: Trichelodes; Carter, 1935
- Species: T. delicatula

Binomial name
- Trichelodes delicatula Carter, 1935

Species of beetle

Trichelodes delicatula is a species of beetle in the family Dermestidae, the only species in the genus Trichelodes.
