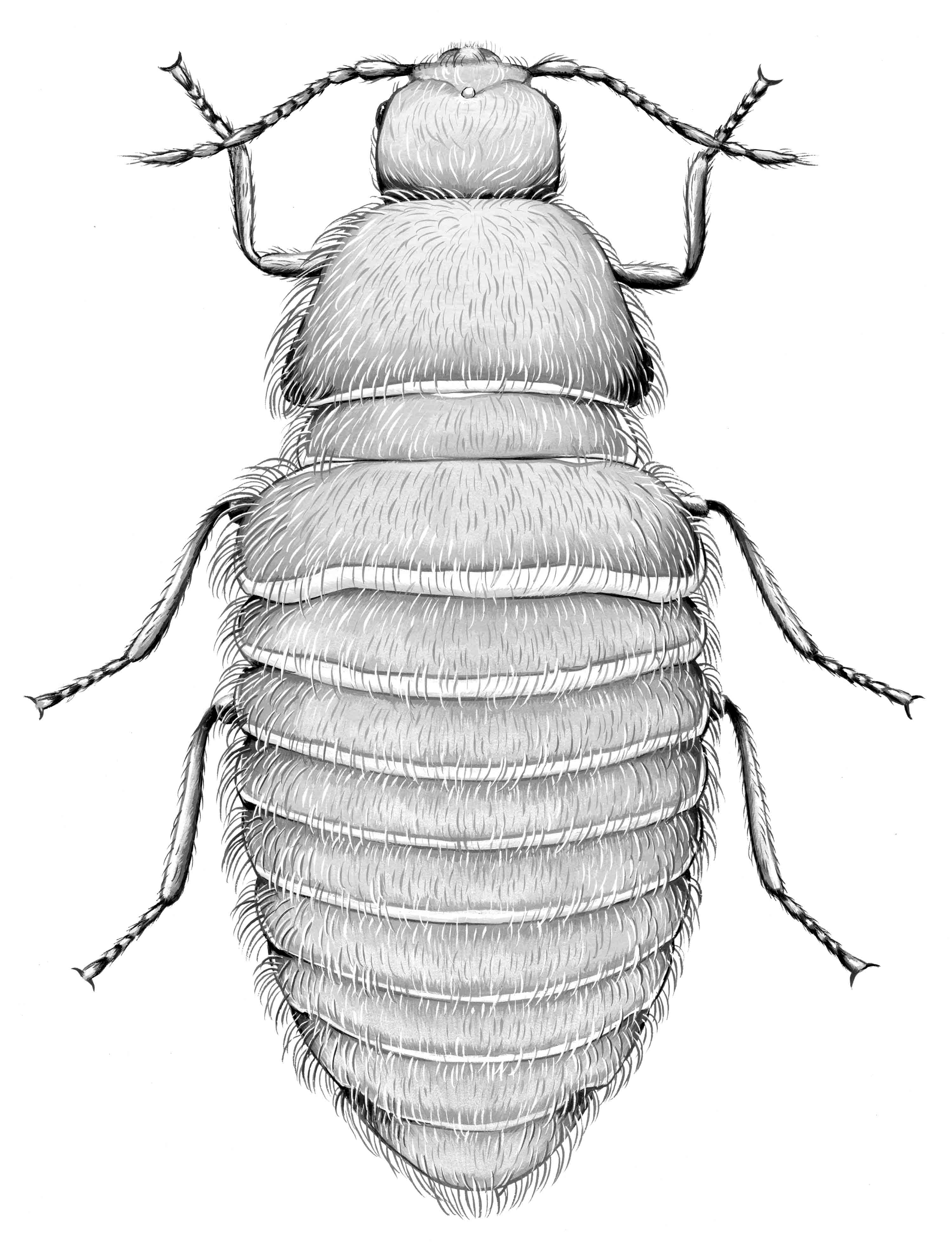
- female

Scientific classification
- Kingdom: Animalia
- Phylum: Arthropoda
- Clade: Pancrustacea
- Class: Insecta
- Order: Coleoptera
- Suborder: Polyphaga
- Family: Dermestidae
- Genus: Thylodrias; Motschulsky, 1839
- Species: T. contractus

Binomial name
- Thylodrias contractus Motschulsky, 1839

= Thylodrias =

Genus of beetles

Thylodrias is a monotypic genus of beetles in the family Dermestidae containing the single species Thylodrias contractus, known commonly as the odd beetle and tissue paper beetle. It is native to Asia and is a widespread introduced species in North America. It can be a pest at times.

== Description ==
T. contractus is an elongate beetle with slender legs. The male can be recognized by its yellowish-brown elytra and covering of silky, white hairs. The abdomen has seven sternal segments and the antennae are filamentous rather than club-shaped, which distinguishes it from all other members of the Dermestidae. The female looks very different from the male. It resembles a larva, and though it is free-living and has legs and antennae, it lacks elytra and hind wings. The larva of the odd beetle resembles that of most other Dermestidae, but it lacks a tuft of hair at the posterior end and any long hairs along the dorsal surface. At the end of each segment of the body is a row of short bristles.

== Natural history ==
=== Life cycle ===
Like all beetles, the odd beetle undergoes complete metamorphosis, or a dramatic reorganization of the body plan of the insect and the formation of two distinct life stages, growth and reproduction, which are separated by a pupal phase. Although the female is larviform, she also undergoes metamorphosis from a true larva to a sexually mature adult. Once T. contractus has reached sexual maturity, the female produces a sex pheromone which attracts the male. Once the female has mated she no longer produces this pheromone, which suggests that she mates only once. There is no indication that this is true for the male.

=== Behavior ===
The odd beetle was given its other common name, the tissue paper beetle, because it was believed to eat tissue paper. It does not actually consume tissue paper, but it may chew through it to reach objects wrapped in it. It feeds on fabrics such as wool and silk, and dried animal matter such as fur, feathers, and skin. Captive odd beetles are also known to feed on cooked beef liver.

The beetle is usually found in dark corners of human structures, such as drawers, cupboards, and museum displays.

The odd beetle displays several behaviors as a reaction to stress. When disturbed it may roll into a ball. It may undergo retrogressive molting in stressful conditions; instead of growing larger, it grows smaller with each molt.

== Gallery ==
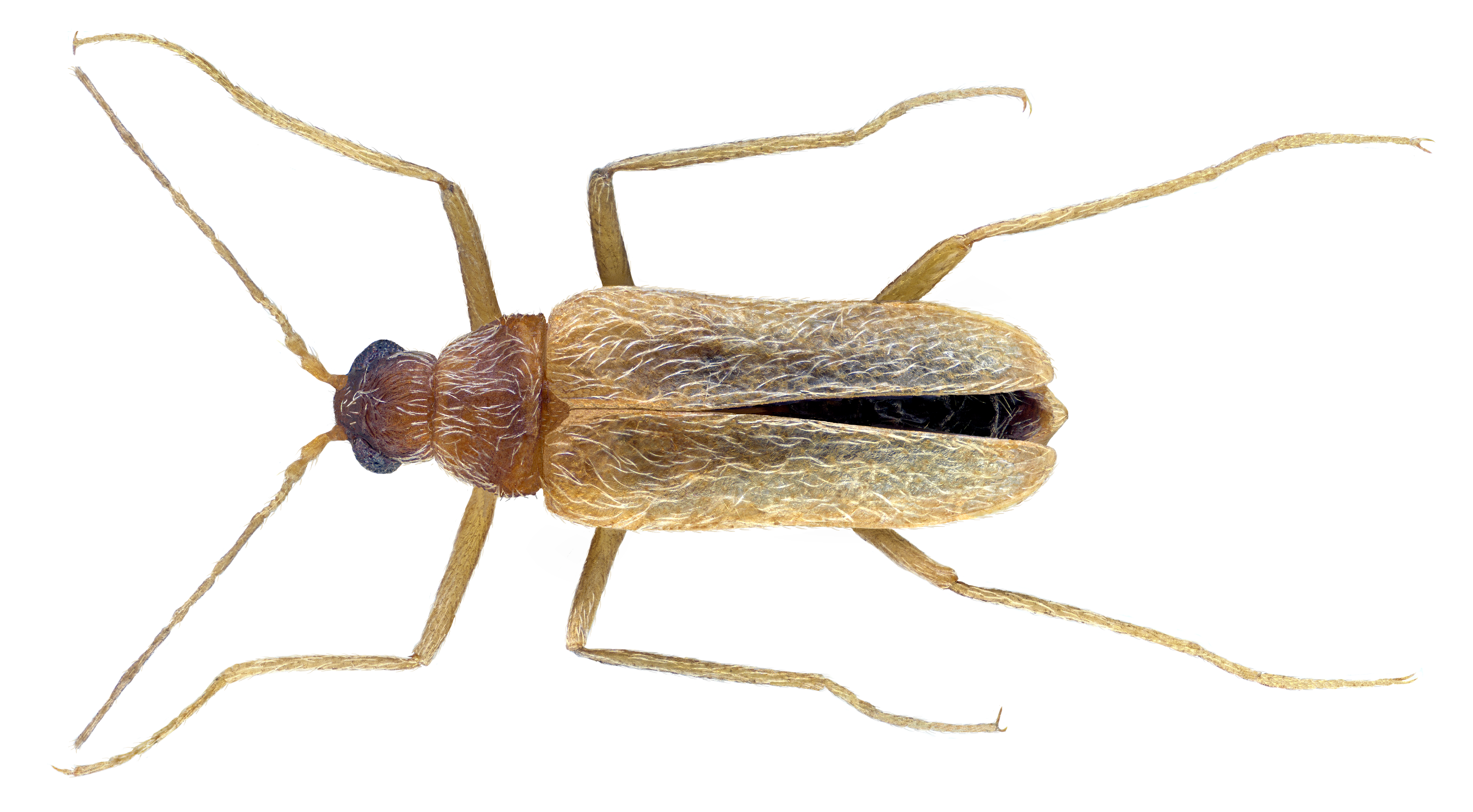
Thylodrias contractus male

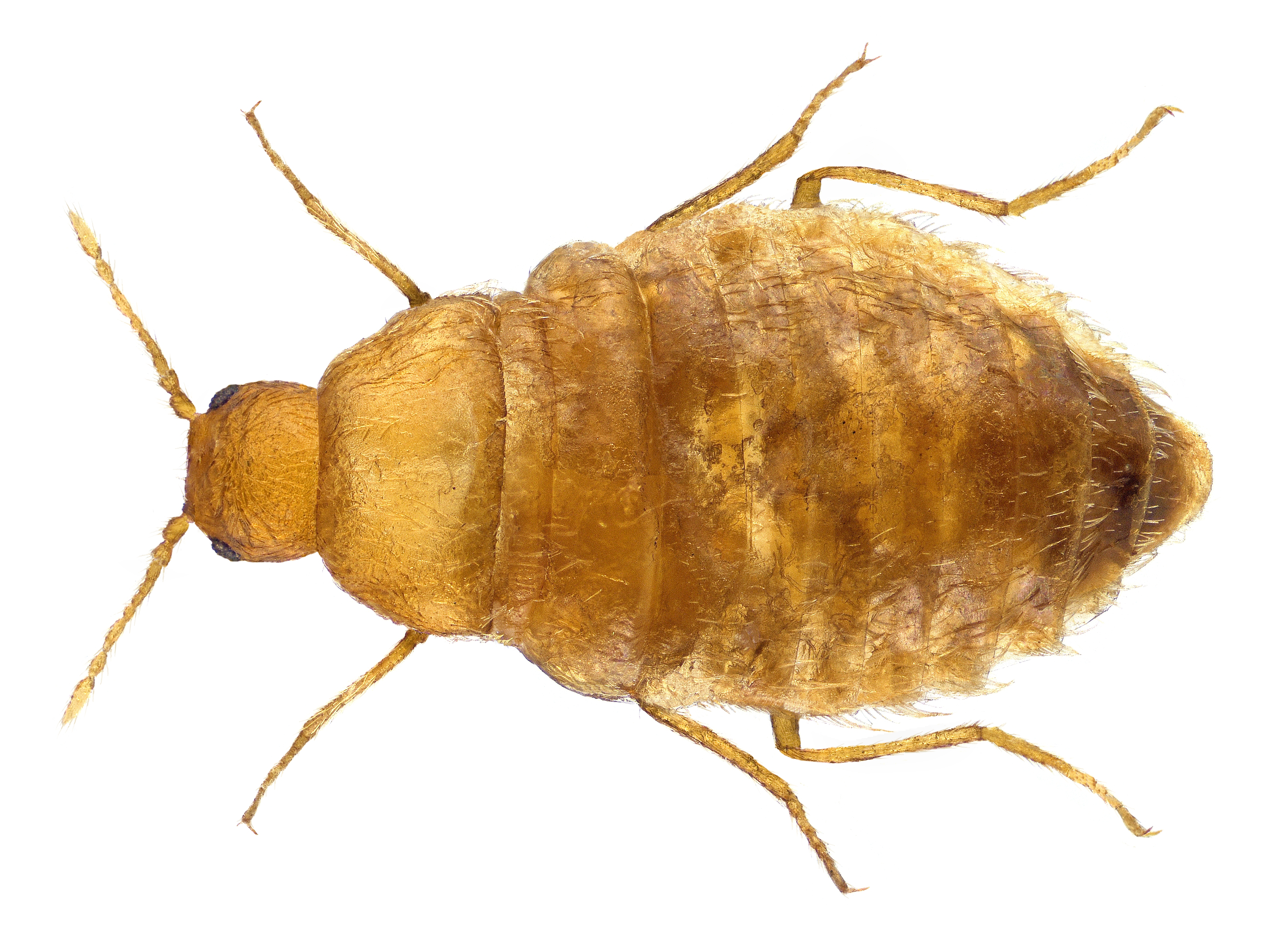
Thylodrias contractus female
