= Rhopalosilpha =

Rhopalosilpha wasmanni

Scientific classification
- Kingdom: Animalia
- Phylum: Arthropoda
- Class: Insecta
- Order: Coleoptera
- Suborder: Polyphaga
- Family: Dermestidae
- Genus: Rhopalosilpha; Arrow, 1929
- Species: R. wasmanni

Binomial name
- Rhopalosilpha wasmanni Arrow, 1929

Species of beetle

Rhopalosilpha wasmanni is a species of beetle in the family Dermestidae, the only species in the genus Rhopalosilpha.
