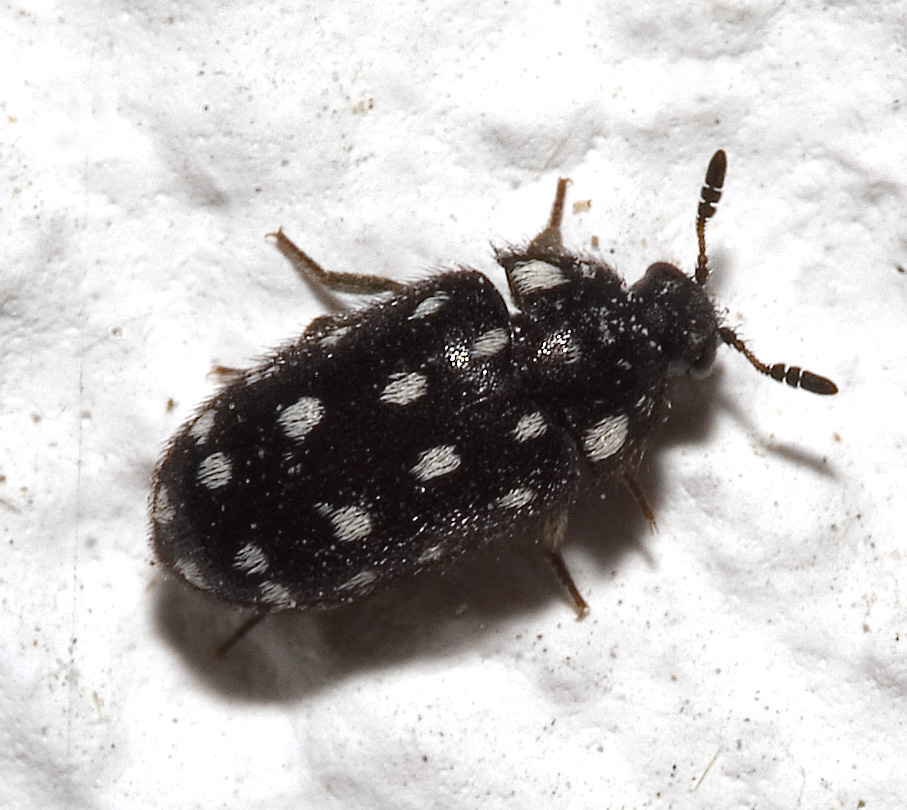
- Attagenus punctatus

Scientific classification
- Kingdom: Animalia
- Phylum: Arthropoda
- Clade: Pancrustacea
- Class: Insecta
- Order: Coleoptera
- Suborder: Polyphaga
- Family: Dermestidae
- Subfamily: Attageninae; Laporte, 1840

= Attageninae =

Subfamily of beetles

Attageninae was a subfamily of beetles in the family Dermestidae. In 2003, that beetle species was reduced in rank and is now treated as the tribe Attagenini.
