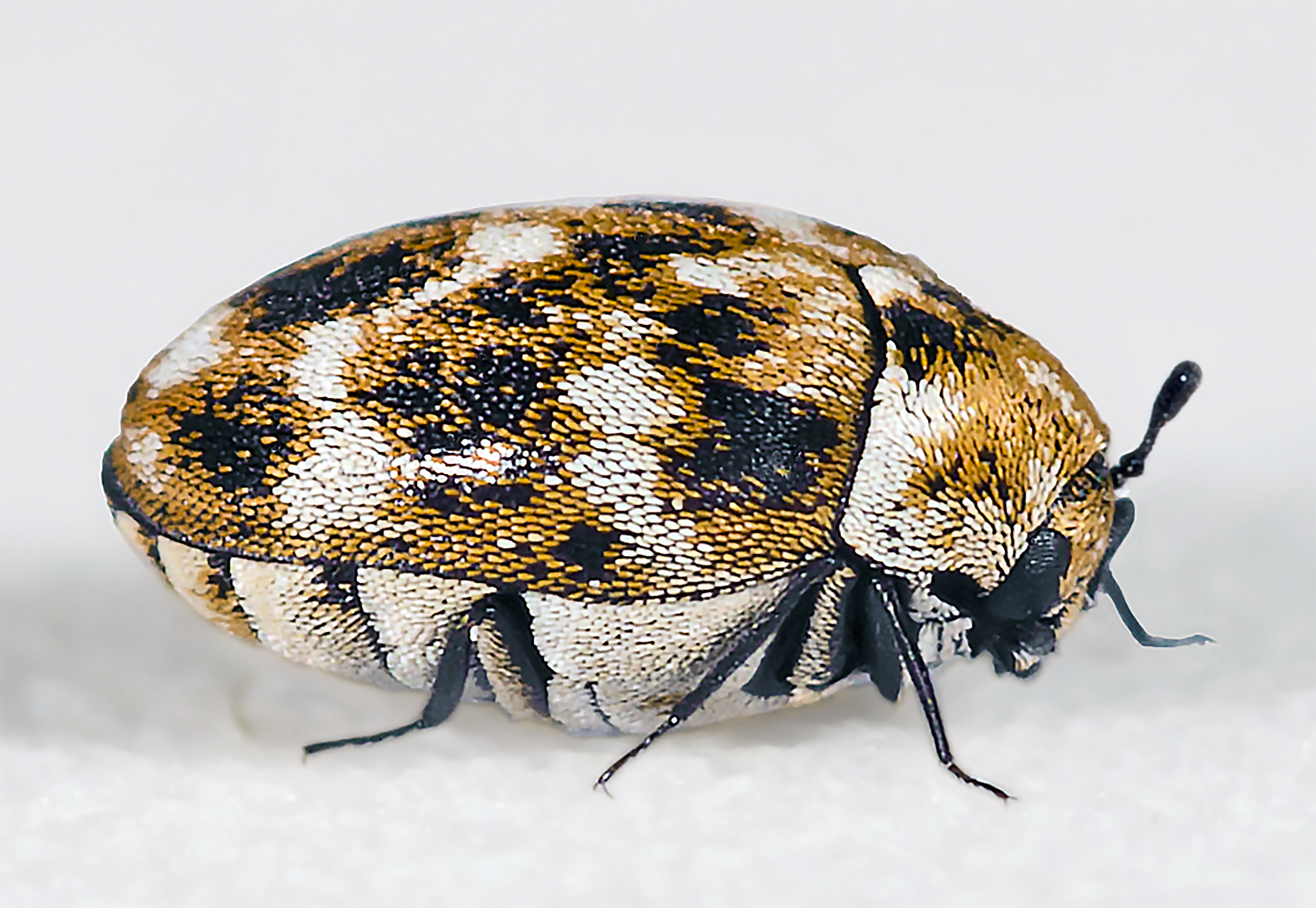
- Varied carpet beetle (Anthrenus verbasci)

Scientific classification
- Kingdom: Animalia
- Phylum: Arthropoda
- Clade: Pancrustacea
- Class: Insecta
- Order: Coleoptera
- Suborder: Polyphaga
- Infraorder: Bostrichiformia
- Superfamily: Bostrichoidea
- Family: Dermestidae; Latreille, 1804

Subfamilies
- Attageninae; Dermestinae; Megatominae; Orphilinae; Thorictinae; Trinodinae; Trogoparvinae

= Dermestidae =

Dermestid beetles Temporal range: Jurassic–Recent

Family of beetles

Dermestidae are a family of Coleoptera that are commonly referred to as skin beetles or carpet beetles. Other common names include larder beetles, hide or leather beetles, and khapra beetles. There are over 1,800 species described.

Dermestids have a variety of habits; most genera are scavengers that feed on dry animal or plant material, such as skin or pollen, animal hair, feathers, dead insects and natural fibers. Members of Dermestes are found in animal carcasses, while others may be found in mammal, bird, bee, or wasp nests. Thaumaglossa only lives in the egg cases of mantids, while Trogoderma species are pests of grain.

These beetles are significant in forensic entomology. Some species are associated with decaying carcasses, which may help with criminal investigations. Some species are pests (urban entomology) and can cause extensive damage to natural fibers in homes and places of business.

They are used in taxidermy and by natural history museums to clean animal skeletons. Some dermestid species, commonly called "bow bugs", infest violin cases, feeding on the bow hair.

== Description ==
Adult Dermestidae are generally small beetles (1–12 mm long), rounded to oval in shape, with hairy or scaly elytra that may form distinctive and colourful patterns. Except in genera Dermestes and Trichelodes, there is a single ocellus in the middle of the head. The antennae are clubbed (except in male Thylodrias contractus) and usually fit into a groove on the underside of the thorax, concealing them when the beetle is at rest. Adult females of T. contractus are notable for being larviform, meaning they retain a larval morphology even into adulthood.

Larval Dermestidae range from 5 to 15 mm long and are usually covered in tufts of long, dense hairs (setae). In subfamily Megatominae and the genus Trinodes, some of these setae are hastisetae: barbed setae ending in spear-like heads (hasta being the Latin word for "spear"). Hastisetae serve a defensive role, detaching and entangling predators.

Pupae of subfamilies Dermestinae and Attageninae are covered in structures known as gin-traps, as defense against predators. Pupae of Megatominae are protected within the exuviae of the last larval instar.

== Diet and behaviour ==
Dermestid larvae are typically found on dry organic items that are hard for other organisms to digest, such as dried foodstuffs, skins, hides, wood and other natural fibers. In forensic studies, the larvae are found on human corpses during the dry and skeletal phases of decomposition, which occurs several days after death. Larvae also move away from light and often hide in any cavity in order to remain undisturbed. In natural habitats, they can be found on animal carcasses, under bark, and in the webs, nests and burrows of various animals.

Larvae of subfamilies Dermestinae and Attageninae (which lack hastisetae), burrow into feeding substrates, pupate in concealed locations, and show fast escape behaviours when disturbed. Larvae of Megatominae (which have hastisetae), do not burrow, pupate where they have been feeding, and their response to disturbance is to stop moving, arch the body and spread the hastisetae. This difference may be because hastisetae would be a hindrance for burrowing larvae.

Adult dermestids are known to feed on pollen and nectar. Adults of Dermestes are cannibalistic and will eat young larvae and pupae; this means that when kept in captivity, adults should be placed in separate containers from the immature stages.

== Economic relevance ==
=== Urban and stored products ===
Dermestid beetles are destructive to a number of common items. Natural fibers such as wool, silk, cotton, linen, fur, or feathers are much more prone to attack than synthetic fibers. Dermestids also attack chocolate, copra, and cocoa beans.

=== Medical ===
Dermestid hastisetae (a specific group of detachable setae from the larvae of subfamily Megatominae), both those attached to exuviae and those shed by larvae, cause health problems in humans when inhaled (rhinoconjunctivitis, asthma), ingested in contaminated food (nausea, fever, diarrhea, proctitis, perianal itching) or touched with skin (dermatitis).

=== Forensic ===
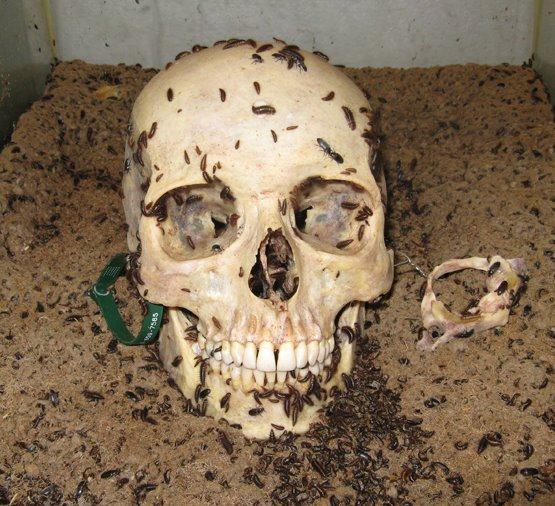
Dermestid beetles being used to clean a human skull at Skulls Unlimited International, Oklahoma City, Oklahoma.

Dermestes maculatus, hide beetles, also have the potential to offer investigators an estimation of the time since death in homicide or questionable cases. Similar to the use of flies in forensic entomology, the arrival of D. maculatus to carrion occurs in a predictable succession. Adult D. maculatus beetles generally arrive 5 to 11 days after death. In an attempt to refine this relatively wide range, recent research has repeated arthropod succession studies. These studies are applied to estimate the arrival of various species of Dermestidae after death. Development for dermestids is temperature dependent, and the optimal temperature for D. maculatus is 30 °C. Development data is normalized using Accumulated Degree Days. Dermestids can also be used in cases involving entomotoxicology, where feces and shed larval skins can be analyzed for toxins.

Dermestes maculatus collected from raccoon carcass:

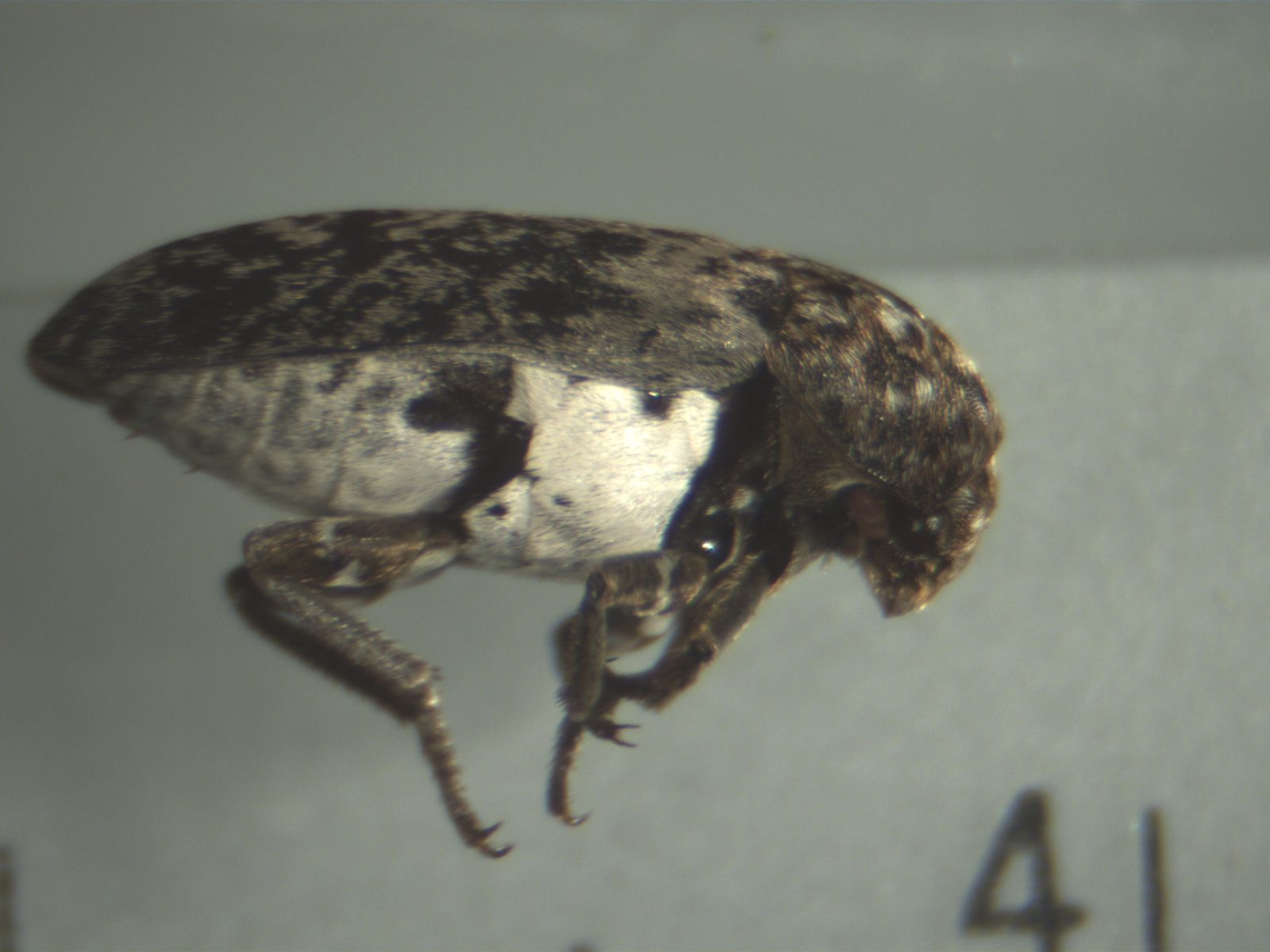
Lateral view (Dermestes maculatus)

Head view (D. maculatus)

Ventral view (D. maculatus)

Dorsal view (D. maculatus)

== Evolution ==
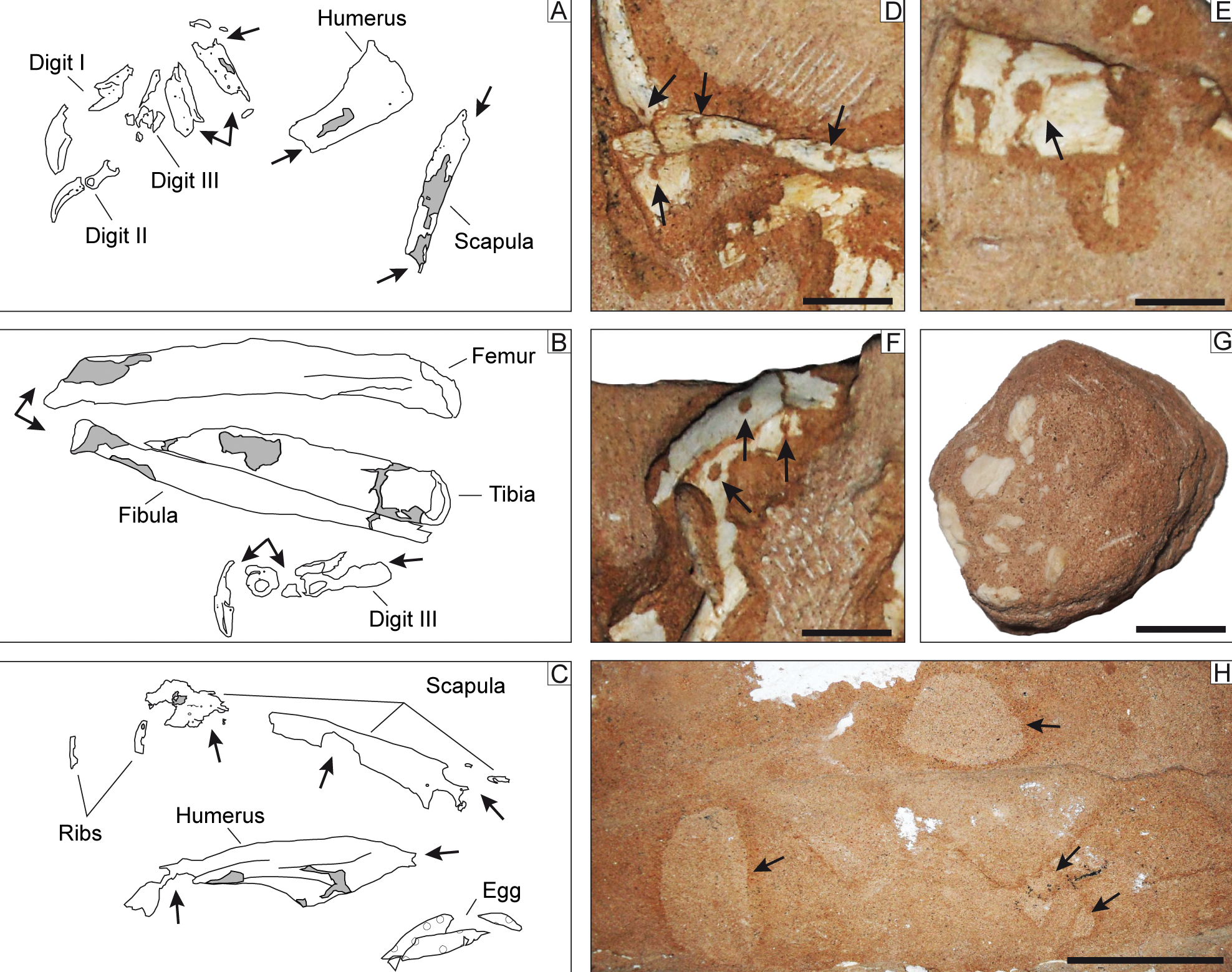
Feeding traces from skin beetles on a specimen of the dinosaur Nemegtomaia

While possible members of the family have been described from the Late Triassic and Early Jurassic based on isolated elytra, the oldest known unambiguous member of the family is Paradermestes from the Middle Jurassic Jiulongshan Formation of China, which appears to belong to the subfamily Dermestinae. Members of the subfamilies Attageninae and Megatominae are known from the Cretaceous, including the living genera Attagenus and Megatoma. The ancestral ecology of the group was likely mycophagy, which is retained in Orphilinae, with the ancestor of most other lineages making the transition to saprophagy.

Borings in fossil dinosaur bones, such as those found in the Allosaurus specimen "Big Al" from the Late Jurassic, have been attributed to dermestid beetle larvae, and interpreted as evidence for the desiccation of carcasses prior to burial.

== Taxonomy ==
According to World Dermestidae catalogue (Jiří Háva, 2023), following taxonomic division is proposed for Dermestidae (at subfamily and tribe levels):

- Dermestidae
  - Megatominae
    - Anthrenini
    - Megatomini
    - Ctesiini
  - Dermestinae
    - Dermestini
    - Marioutini
    - Paradermestini
  - Thorictinae
    - Thorictini
    - Thaumaphrastini
  - Orphilinae
    - Orphilini
    - Ranolini
  - Trinodinae
    - Cretonodini
    - Thylodriini
    - Trichelodini
    - Trinodini
    - Trinoparvini
  - Attageninae
    - Attagenini
    - Apphianini
    - Adelaidiini
    - Cretodermestini
    - Eckfeldattagenini
    - Egidyellini
  - Trogoparvinae

== Genera ==
Dermestidae contains the following 74 genera:

- Adelaidella Zhou, Ślipiński & Liu, 2020
- Adelaidia Blackburn, 1891
- Afrothorictus Andreae, 1967
- Amberoderma Háva & Prokop, 2004
- Anthrenocerus Arrow, 1915
- Anthrenus Geoffroy, 1762
- Apphianus Beal, 2005
- Apsectus LeConte, 1854
- Araphonotos Beal & Kadej, 2008
- Attagenus Latreille, 1802
- Caccoleptoides Herrmann, Háva & Kadej, 2015
- Caccoleptus Sharp, 1902
- Chilattagenus Háva, 2021
- Claviella Kalík, 1987
- †Cretoattagenus Háva, 2020
- †Cretodermestes Deng, Ślipiński, Ren & Pang, 2017
- †Cretomegatoma Háva, 2021
- †Cretonodes Kirejtshuk & Azar, 2009
- Cryptorhopalum Guérin-Méneville, 1838
- Ctesias Stephens, 1830
- Dearthrus LeConte, 1861
- Derbyana Lawrence & Ślipiński, 2005
- Dermalius Háva, 2001
- Dermeanthrenus Háva, 2008
- Dermestes Linnaeus, 1758
- †Eckfeldattagenus Háva & Wappler, 2014
- Egidyella Reitter, 1899
- Evorinea Beal, 1961
- Globicornis Latreille, 1829
- Hemirhopalum Sharp, 1902
- Hexanodes Blair, 1941
- Hirtomegatoma Pic, 1931
- Jiriella Kitano, 2013
- Katkaenus Háva, 2006
- Labrocerus Sharp, 1885
- Liberorphinus Háva & Matsumoto, 2021
- Macrothorictus Andreae, 1967
- Mariouta Pic, 1898
- Megatoma Herbst, 1791
- Miocryptorhopalum Pierce, 1960
- Myrmeanthrenus Armstrong, 1945
- Novelsis Casey, 1900
- †Oisenodes Kirejtshuk, Háva & Nel, 2010
- Orbeola Mulsant & Rey, 1868
- Orphilus Erichson, 1846
- Orphinus Motschulsky, 1858
- Papuderma Háva, 2021
- †Paradermestes Deng, Ślipiński, Ren & Pang, 2017
- Paranovelsis Casey, 1900
- Paratrogoderma Scott, 1926
- Pecticaccoleptus Háva, 2004
- Phradonoma Jacquelin du Val, 1859
- Ranolus Blair, 1929
- Reesa Beal, 1967
- Rhopalosilpha Arrow, 1929
- Sefrania Pic, 1899
- Socotracornis Háva, 2013
- Sodaliatoma Háva, 2013
- Thaumaglossa Redtenbacher, 1867
- Thorictodes Reitter, 1875
- Thorictus Germar, 1834
- Thylodrias Motschulsky, 1839
- Trichelodes Carter, 1935
- Trichodryas Lawrence & Ślipiński, 2005
- Trinodes Dejean, 1821
- Trinoparvus Háva, 2004
- Trogoderma Dejean, 1821
- Trogoparvus Háva, 2001
- †Tuberphradonoma Háva, 2021
- Turcicornis Háva, 2000
- Valdesetosum Háva, 2015
- Volvicornis Háva & Kalík, 2004
- Zahradnikia Háva, 2013
- Zhantievus Beal, 1992

== Selected taxa ==
=== Larder beetles ===
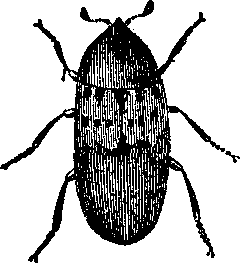
Dermestes lardarius

The larva of the larder beetle Dermestes lardarius is longer than the adult and is covered in reddish brown or black setae. It has two back-curved, spine-like appendages on the posterior end. The larva of the black larder beetle has less strongly curved appendages. Mature larvae of both species tend to bore into hard substrates such as wood, cork, and plaster to pupate.

Larder beetles are infrequent household pests. Adults and larvae feed on raw skins and hides. Adult larder beetles are generally 1/3 to 3/8 of an inch long and are dark brown with a broad, pale yellow spotted band across the upper portion of the elytra. There are three black dots arranged in a triangle shape on each wing. The sternum and legs of the larder beetle are covered in fine, yellow setae. Adult larder beetles are typically found outdoors in protected areas during the winter, but during the spring and early summer they enter buildings. Females lay approximately 135 eggs near a food source, and the eggs will hatch in about 12 days. The life cycle of larder beetles lasts around 40 to 50 days.

The black larder or incinerator beetle, Dermestes ater, is completely dark with scattered yellow setae on the body. It is similar to Dermestes maculatus but lacks serrations on its elytra. Its ventral surface is yellow instead of white. This beetle is a pest of fish, mushrooms, and cheese.

=== Hide beetle (leather beetle) ===
Dermestes maculatus, known as the hide beetle, leather beetle, or skin beetle, feeds on raw skins and hides like the larder beetle. This species is similar in appearance to the larder beetle, with larvae covered in short and long reddish brown or black setae, but its two spine-like posterior appendages curve forward. Also, in adults, the forewings are dark brown and the sternum is mostly white with some black. Its life cycle is 60 to 70 days and the female can lay up to 800 eggs.

The hide and larder beetles both feed on an assortment of animal protein based products and cause serious damage in the areas of silkworm production and museums.

=== Carpet beetle ===
Carpet beetle larvae start to feed as soon as they hatch. They are carrot shaped and heavily covered with setae, especially on their posterior end. The number of instars typically ranges from five to 11 and in some cases may reach as high as 20. Larvae of the black carpet beetle Attagenus megatoma may grow up to 1/2 inch (13 mm) and be yellow to brown in color. Other types of carpet beetle are regularly 1/4 to 1 inch (6.4 to 25.4 millimetres) long and covered with dark setae. Certain species have distinctive tufts of setae extending from their posterior end. These beetles are attracted to soiled fabrics and crevices where dead insects may serve as a food source. The larvae of the carpet beetle are often referred to as "woolly bears" or "buffalo moths".

=== Black carpet beetle ===
The black carpet beetle, Attagenus megatoma, is a widely known stored product pest and one of the most destructive because of its potential damage to household products containing keratin, which is a protein found in animal hair and feathers. They are also able to burrow through various types of food packaging, allowing passage for other insects.

Females can lay up to 90 eggs and they hatch in about 8 to 15 days. Generally, this species only has one generation a year. The time it takes to become an adult varies from six months to a year. In addition, an adult black carpet beetle can live for an additional two months. The average adult size is about 2.8 to 5 mm long and they are oval, dark brown to shiny-black in color, and have brown legs.

=== Varied carpet beetle ===
The varied carpet beetle, Anthrenus verbasci, attacks typical household objects. Carpet beetles are normally associated with things such as carpets, wool, furs, and any processed animal or plant food. Their appetite also includes dead insects, spiders, and even nectar and pollen. They are typically found throughout the United States and Canada. Females can lay up to 40 eggs and the number of larval instars is seven or eight. The time it takes to become an adult varies from about eight months to a year. In addition, the adults can live around 2 to 6 weeks. This species varies in shape, size, color, and pattern of scales. On average, the adults are 2 to 3 mm in length and have scales that vary from white, brown, yellow, or even gray-yellow. The hairs of the larvae can cause allergic reactions such as contact dermatitis or blisters in humans who come into contact with the sharp tiny hairs.

=== Khapra beetle ===
On hatching, the larvae of khapra beetle (Trogoderma granarium) are around 1.6 to 1.8 mm long and mostly covered with dense setae, some simple and some barbed. Larvae are yellow-white but the head and body setae are brown. As the larvae further develop, their color changes to a golden or reddish brown and the abdomen portion becomes proportionally shorter. The mature larvae reach a maximum length of 6 mm long and 1.5 mm wide.

The khapra beetle is a stored-product pest. Infestations are difficult to control because they crawl into cracks and crevices, remaining for long periods of time. They tend to infest grains and create serious losses to stored products. The adults are covered with setae and are approximately 1.5 to 3 mm long and 1 to 2 mm wide. Male khapra beetles are brown to black with reddish brown markings on the elytra. Females are slightly larger and are lighter in color. The short, 11 segmented antennae has a club of 3 to 5 segments, which fit into a groove on the side of the pronotum.

== Control ==
=== Hide and larder beetles ===
Modern methods of meat slaughtering, storage, and distribution have reduced potential infestations of hide beetles. Proper housekeeping is crucial for the prevention of infestations. Dead insects in homes usually attract these beetles because they are a prime food source for hide and larder beetles. Food must be tightly sealed or stored in a refrigerator to avoid any beetle access. Freezing food for a week or heating meat in a pan or microwave for prolonged lengths can kill insects found in infested foods and prevent them from spreading.

Household fibers, such as wool and silk, are especially prone to moth damage and special cleaning, which includes moth proofing, needs to be done frequently. Application of insecticides must be by spot treatment to crack and crevice sites where they are suspected of hiding. Pyrethrins are labeled for use against hide beetles. Insecticides used for carpet beetles are also appropriate to use against hide and larder beetles.

=== Carpet beetles ===
Regular cleaning of spilled food or lint will eliminate any sites for potential breeding. Susceptible items like food, woolens, and furs should be stored in an insect-proof container. If an infestation is suspected then the source of the problem must be removed and destroyed to further limit any possibility of spreading. These beetles can be killed with extreme heat or exposure to freezers.

Pyrethroid insecticides can be used to control carpet beetles. These contain active ingredients such as permethrin, bifenthrin, deltamethrin and tralomethrin.

Diatomaceous earth is also effective.

== Image gallery ==
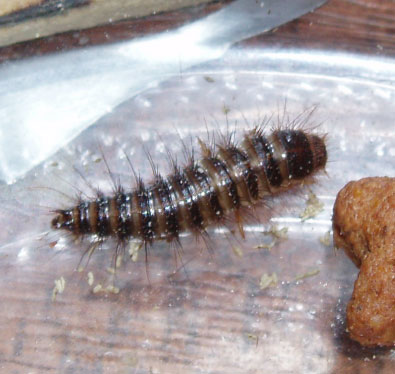
The grub of a larder beetle (Dermestes lardarius)

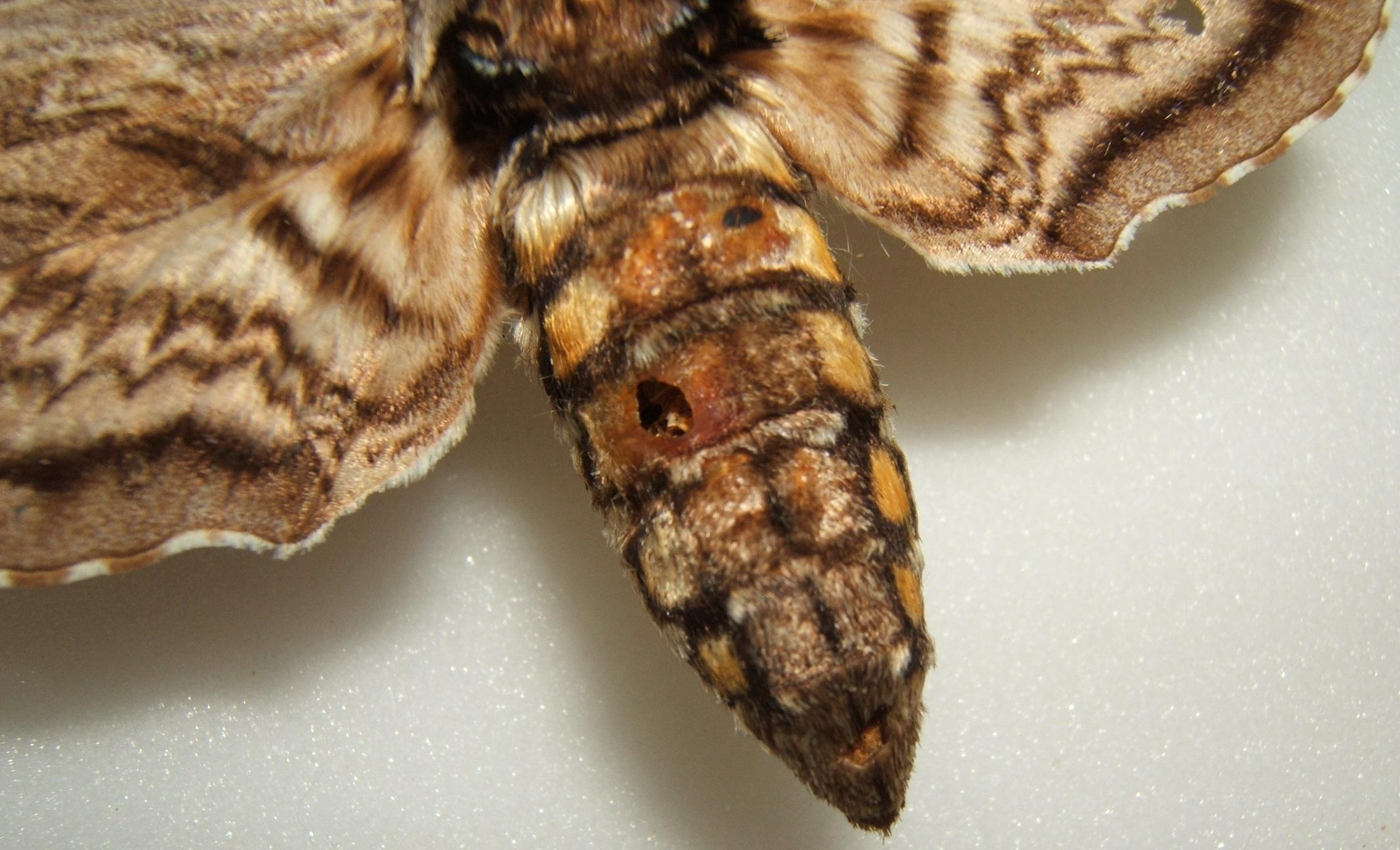
Dermestidae damage to a Manduca quinquemaculata in an insect collection

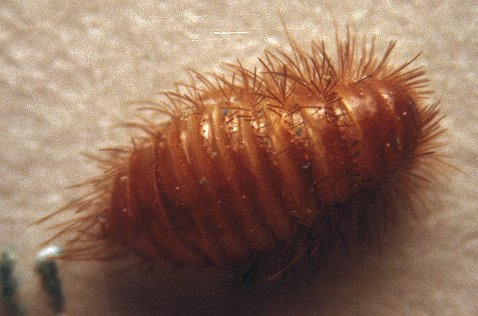
The larva of Anthrenus verbasci beetle

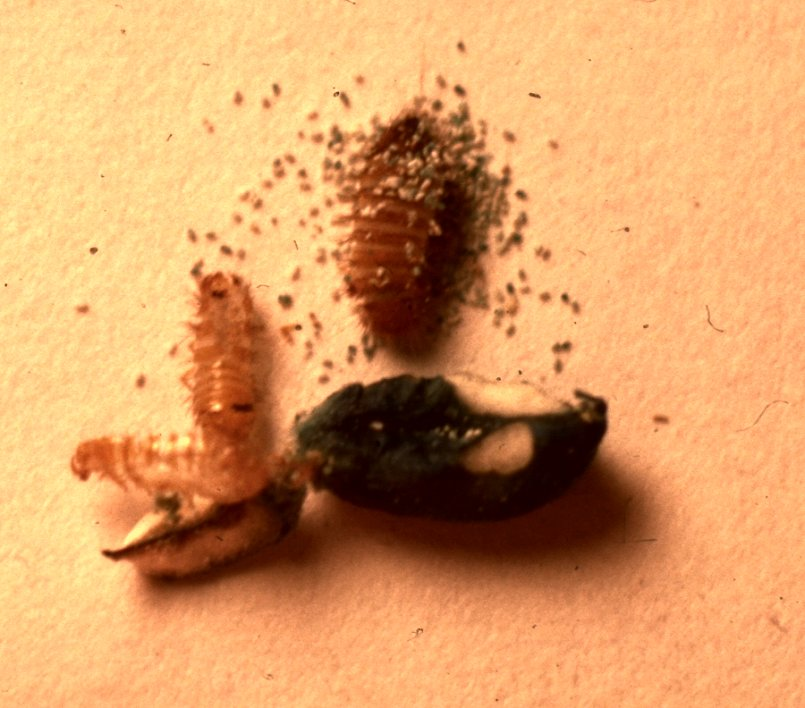
The larva of an Anthrenus verbasci beetle, frass, cast skin & a single grain of blue rodent bait damaged by the larva

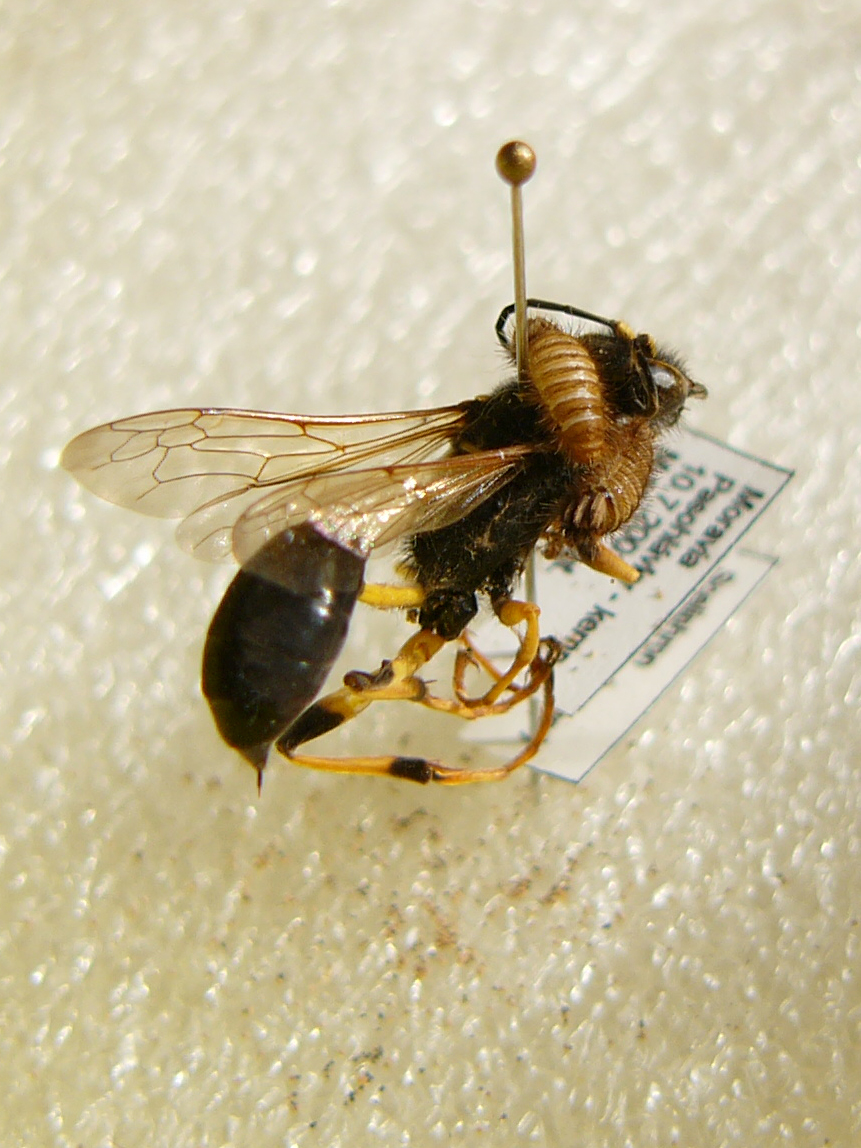
Carpet beetle damaging a Sceliphron destillatorius in an insect collection
