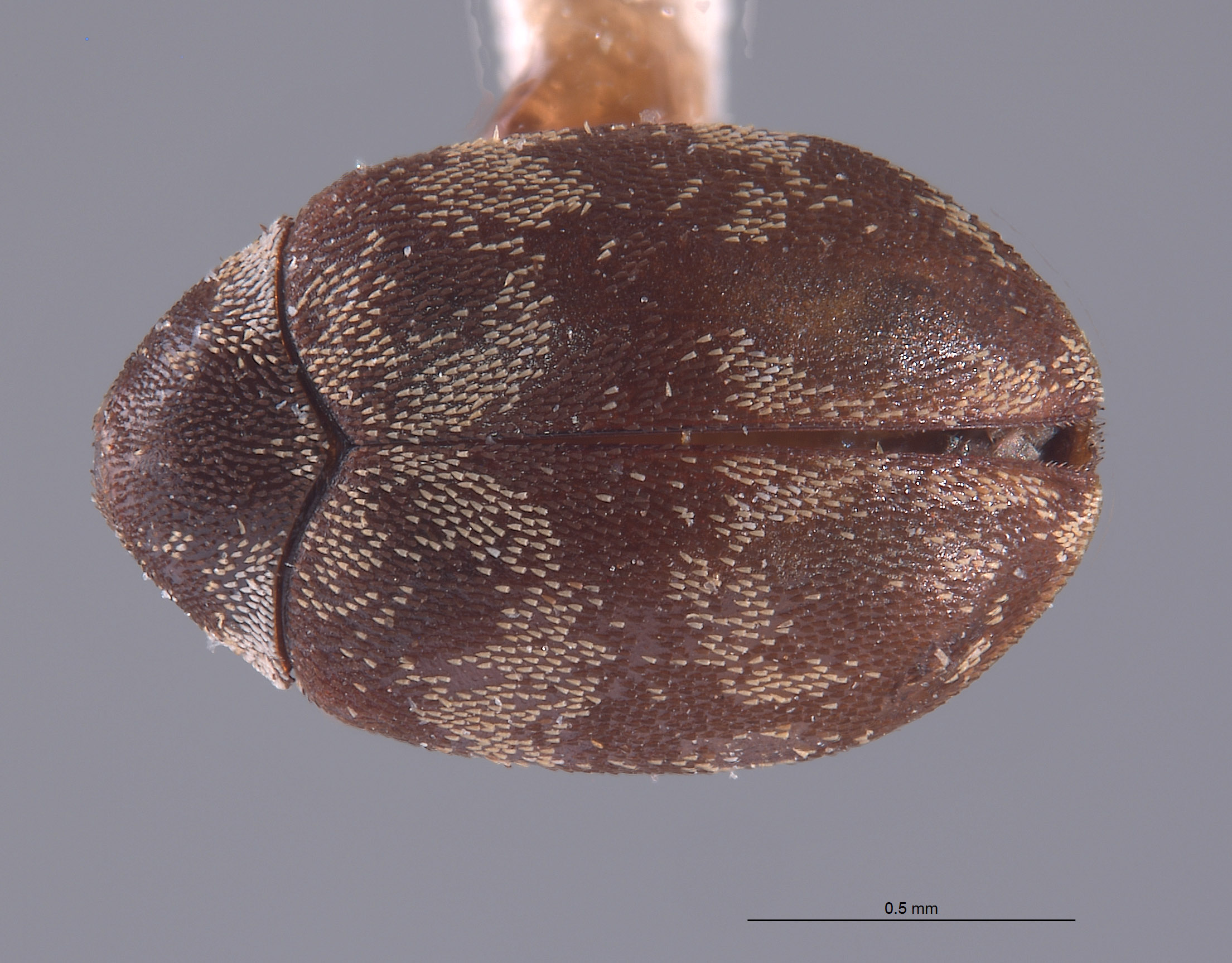
- Dorsal image
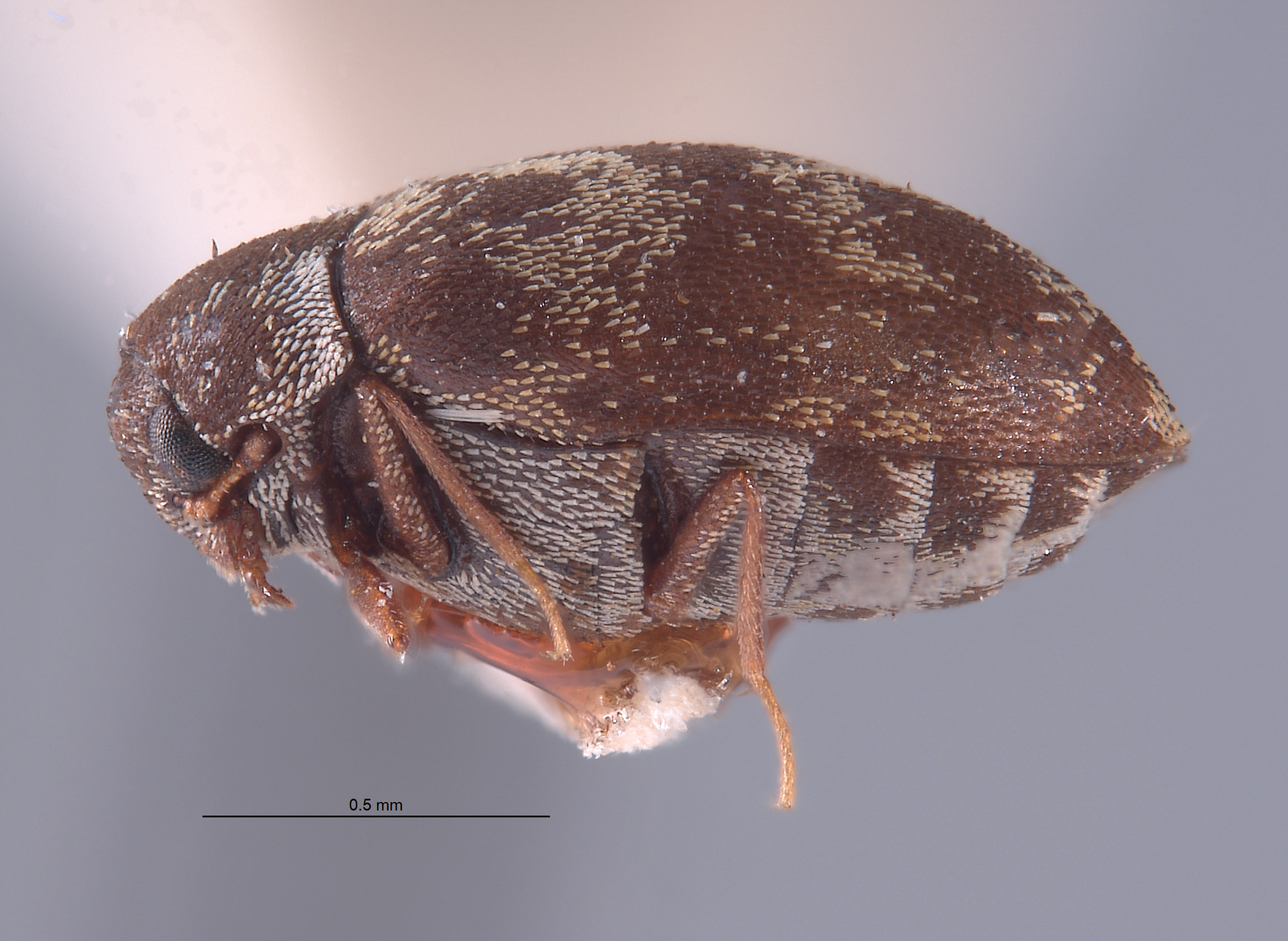
- Lateral image

Scientific classification
- Kingdom: Animalia
- Phylum: Arthropoda
- Class: Insecta
- Order: Coleoptera
- Suborder: Polyphaga
- Family: Dermestidae
- Genus: Anthrenus
- Subgenus: Florilinus
- Species: A. blanci

Binomial name
- Anthrenus blanci Beal, 1998

= Anthrenus blanci =

Species of beetle

Anthrenus blanci is a species of carpet beetle in the subgenus Florilinus of the genus Anthrenus, family Dermestidae. It is known from Canada (British Columbia) and the United States (California, Oregon, Washington).

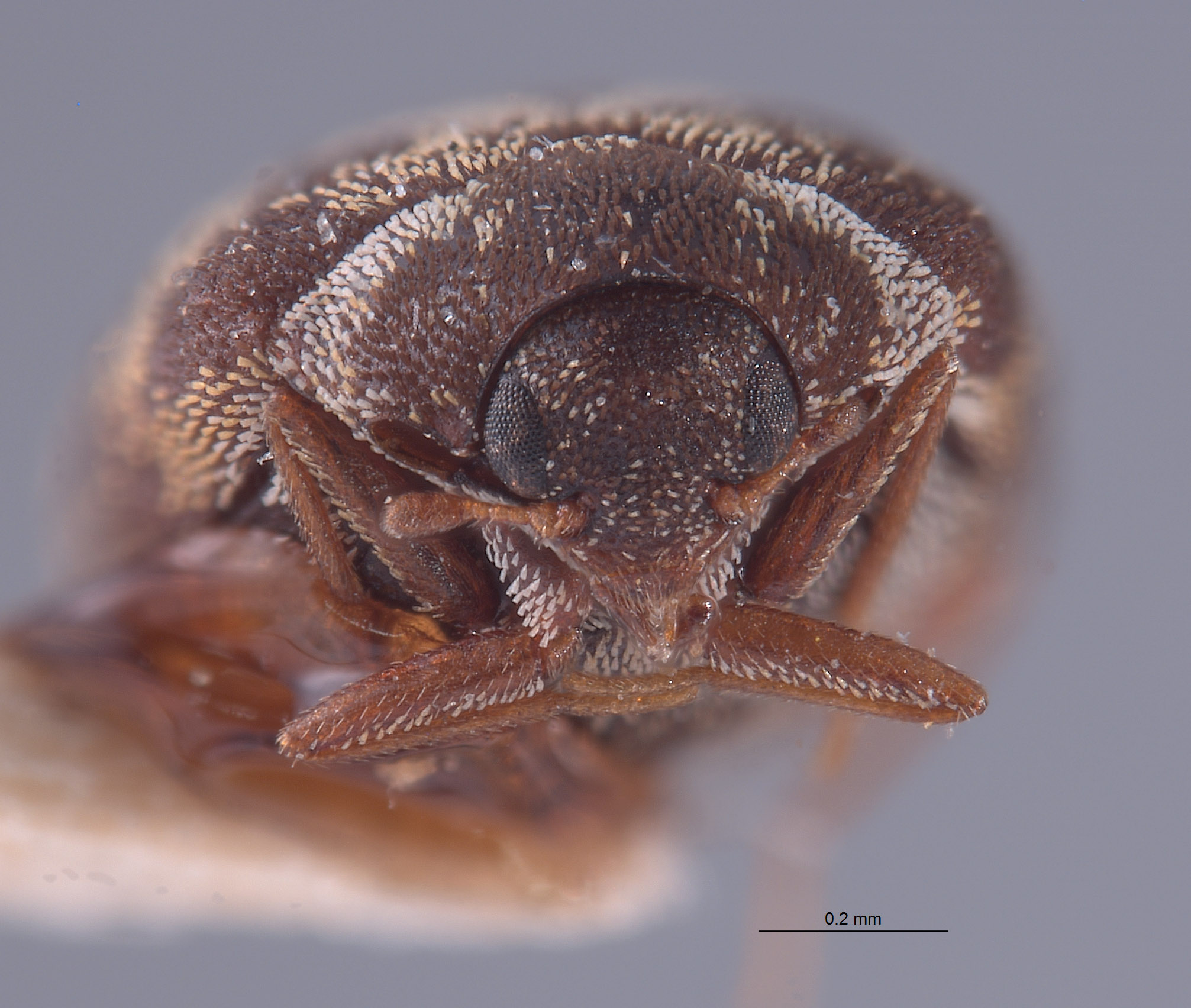
Adult A. blanci. Head view

== See also ==
Other Florilinus species known from North America:

- Anthrenus castaneae
- Anthrenus museorum (cosmopolitan)
