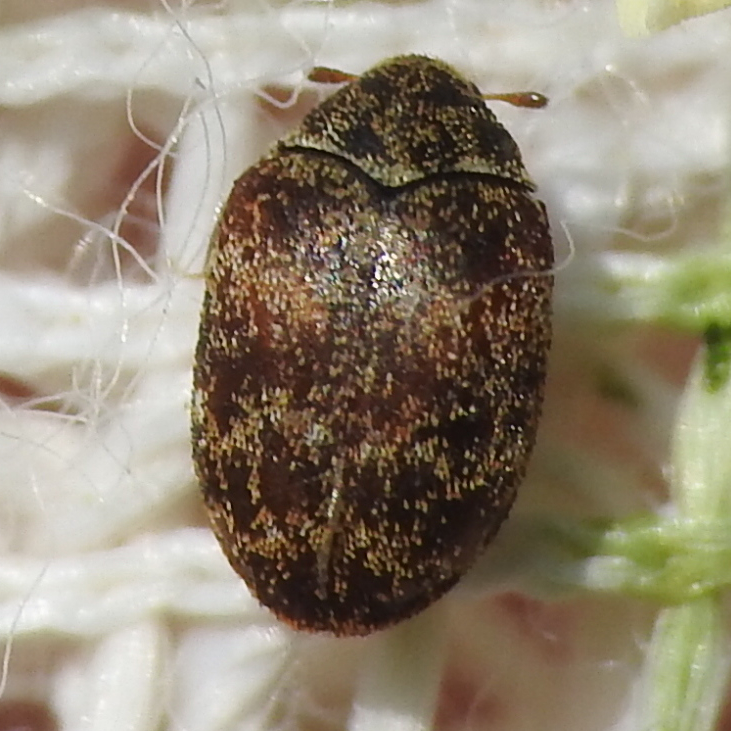

Scientific classification
- Kingdom: Animalia
- Phylum: Arthropoda
- Class: Insecta
- Order: Coleoptera
- Suborder: Polyphaga
- Family: Dermestidae
- Tribe: Anthrenini
- Genus: Anthrenus
- Species: A. castaneae

Binomial name
- Anthrenus castaneae Melsheimer, 1844

= Anthrenus castaneae =

Species of beetle

Anthrenus castaneae is a species of carpet beetle in the family Dermestidae. It is found in North America (United States and Canada).

== See also ==
Other Florilinus species known from North America:

- Anthrenus blanci
- Anthrenus museorum (cosmopolitan)
