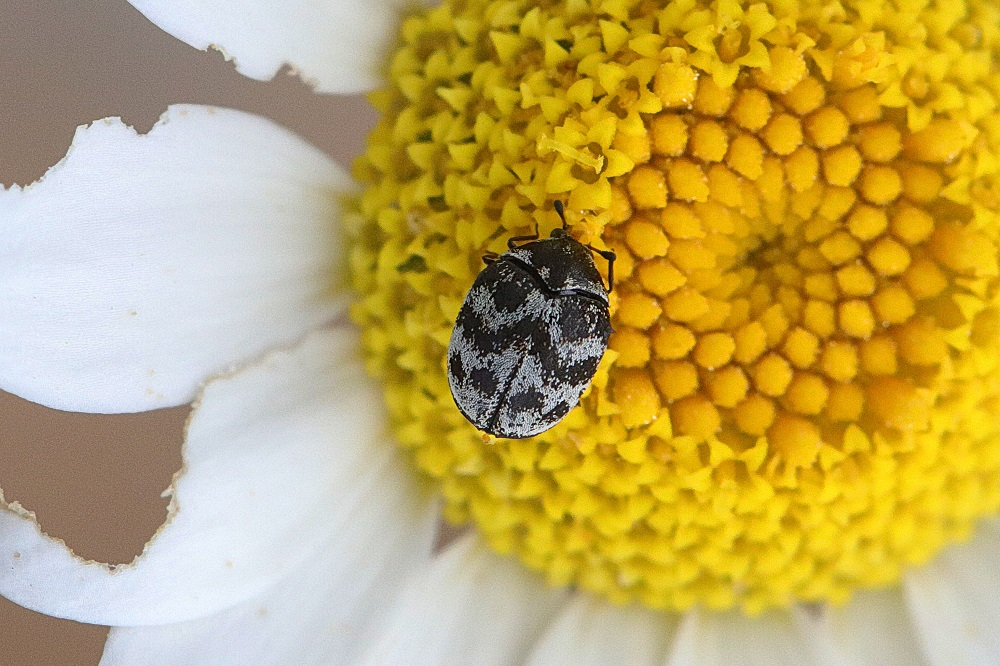

Scientific classification
- Kingdom: Animalia
- Phylum: Arthropoda
- Class: Insecta
- Order: Coleoptera
- Suborder: Polyphaga
- Family: Dermestidae
- Genus: Anthrenus
- Subgenus: Nathrenus
- Species: A. signatus

Binomial name
- Anthrenus signatus Erichson, 1846

= Anthrenus signatus =

Species of beetle

Anthrenus signatus is a species of carpet beetle in the subgenus Nathrenus of the genus Anthrenus, family Dermestidae. It is known from Austria, Bosnia and Herzegovina, Bulgaria, Croatia, Czech Republic, Greece, Hungary, Italy, Montenegro, Poland, Romania, Serbia, Slovakia, Slovenia, Spain, and Turkey.

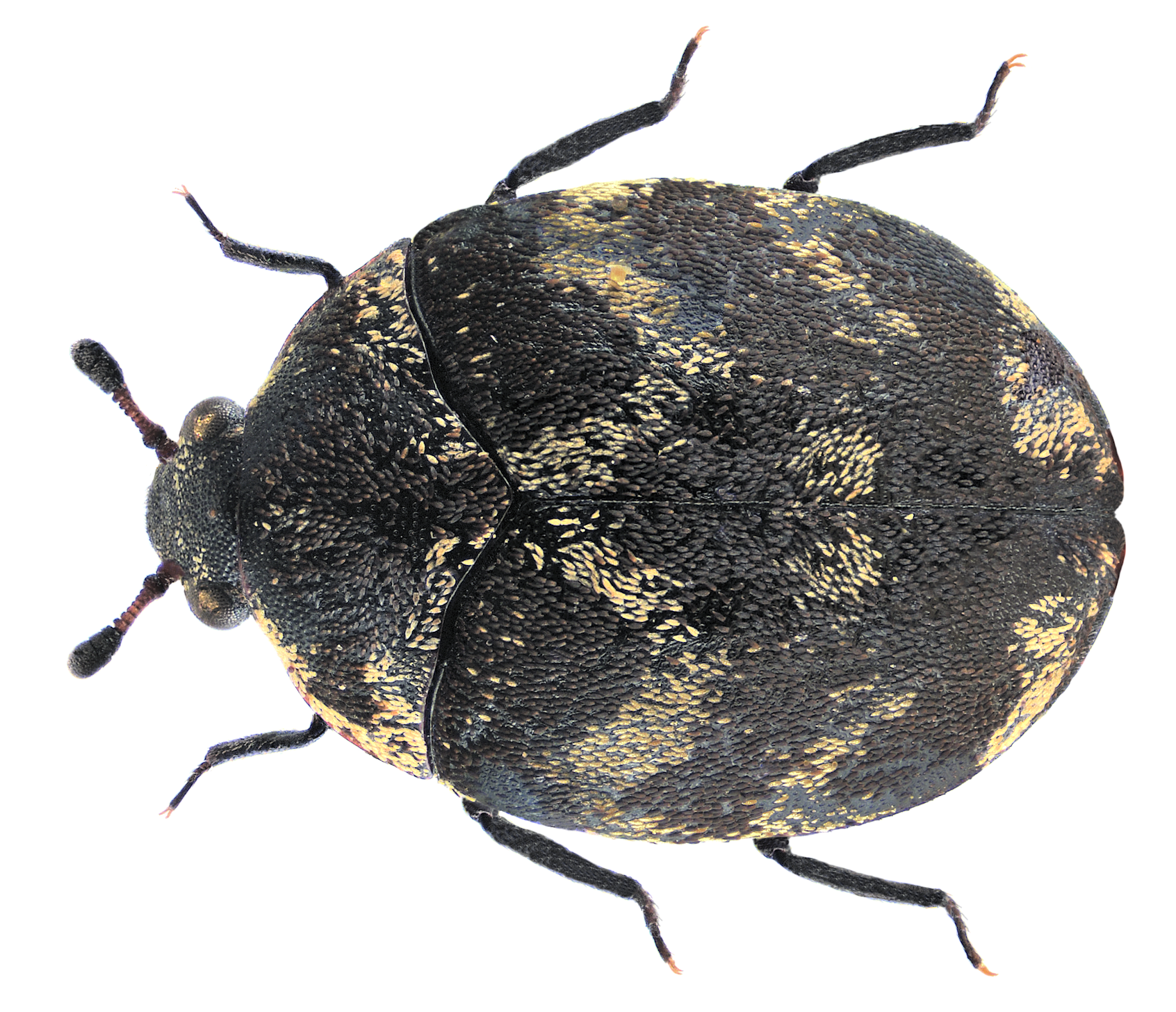
