= Anthrenus obenbergeri =

Conservation status
- Near Threatened (IUCN 3.1)

Scientific classification
- Kingdom: Animalia
- Phylum: Arthropoda
- Class: Insecta
- Order: Coleoptera
- Suborder: Polyphaga
- Family: Dermestidae
- Genus: Anthrenus
- Subgenus: Nathrenus
- Species: A. obenbergeri

Binomial name
- Anthrenus obenbergeri Háva & Herrmann, 2021

Species of beetle

Anthrenus (Nathrenus) obenbergeri is a species of carpet beetle found in Crete (Greece).
