= Anthrenus exilis =

Scientific classification
- Kingdom: Animalia
- Phylum: Arthropoda
- Class: Insecta
- Order: Coleoptera
- Suborder: Polyphaga
- Family: Dermestidae
- Genus: Anthrenus
- Subgenus: Nathrenus
- Species: A. exilis

Binomial name
- Anthrenus exilis Mulsant & Rey, 1868

Species of beetle

Anthrenus (Nathrenus) exilis is a species of carpet beetle found in Algeria, Egypt, Libya, Morocco, Chad, and Tunisia.
