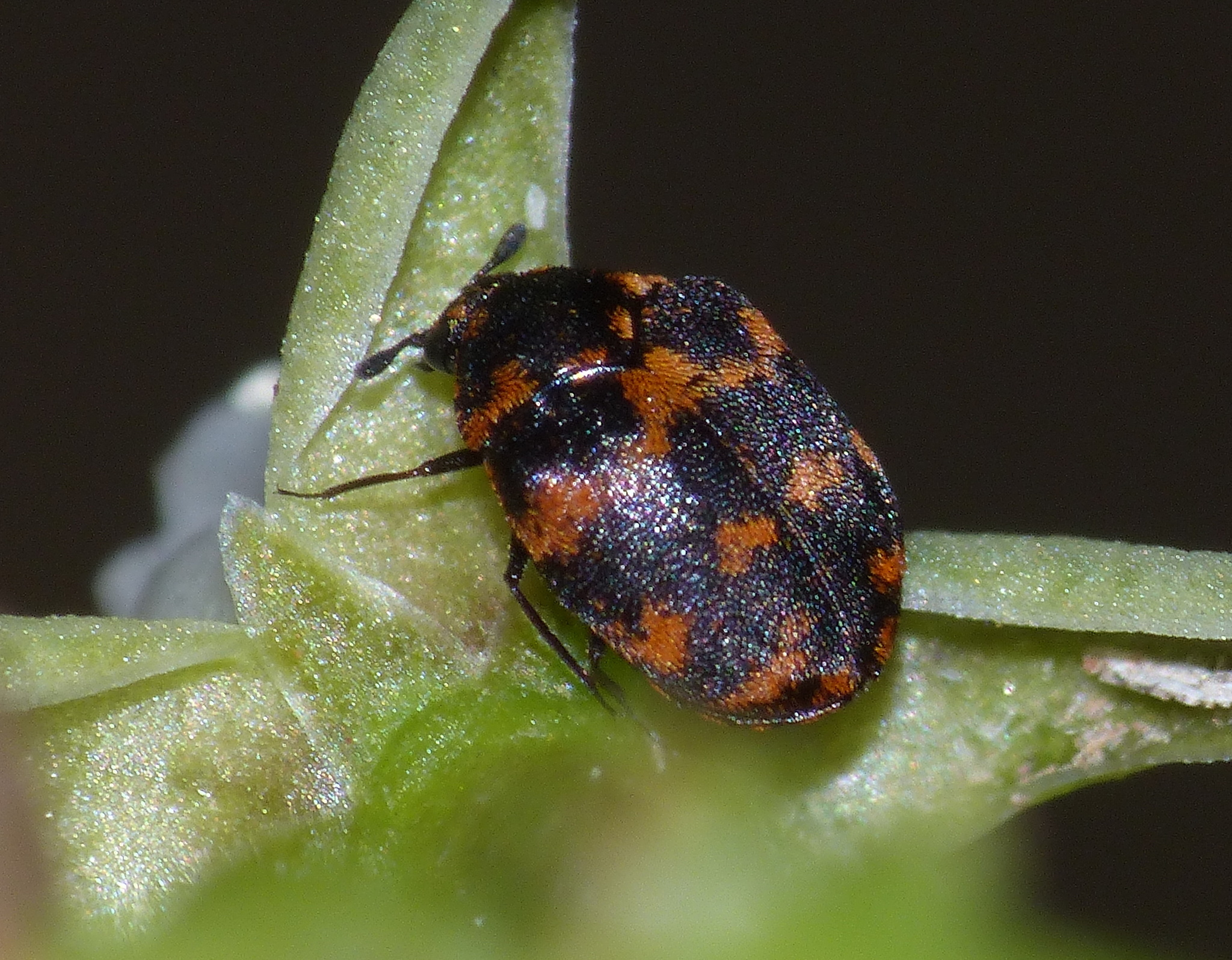

Scientific classification
- Kingdom: Animalia
- Phylum: Arthropoda
- Class: Insecta
- Order: Coleoptera
- Suborder: Polyphaga
- Family: Dermestidae
- Genus: Anthrenus
- Subgenus: Nathrenus
- Species: A. margarethae

Binomial name
- Anthrenus margarethae Háva & Kadej, 2006

= Anthrenus margarethae =

Species of beetle

Anthrenus (Nathrenus) margarethae is a species of carpet beetle native to South Africa.

== Description ==
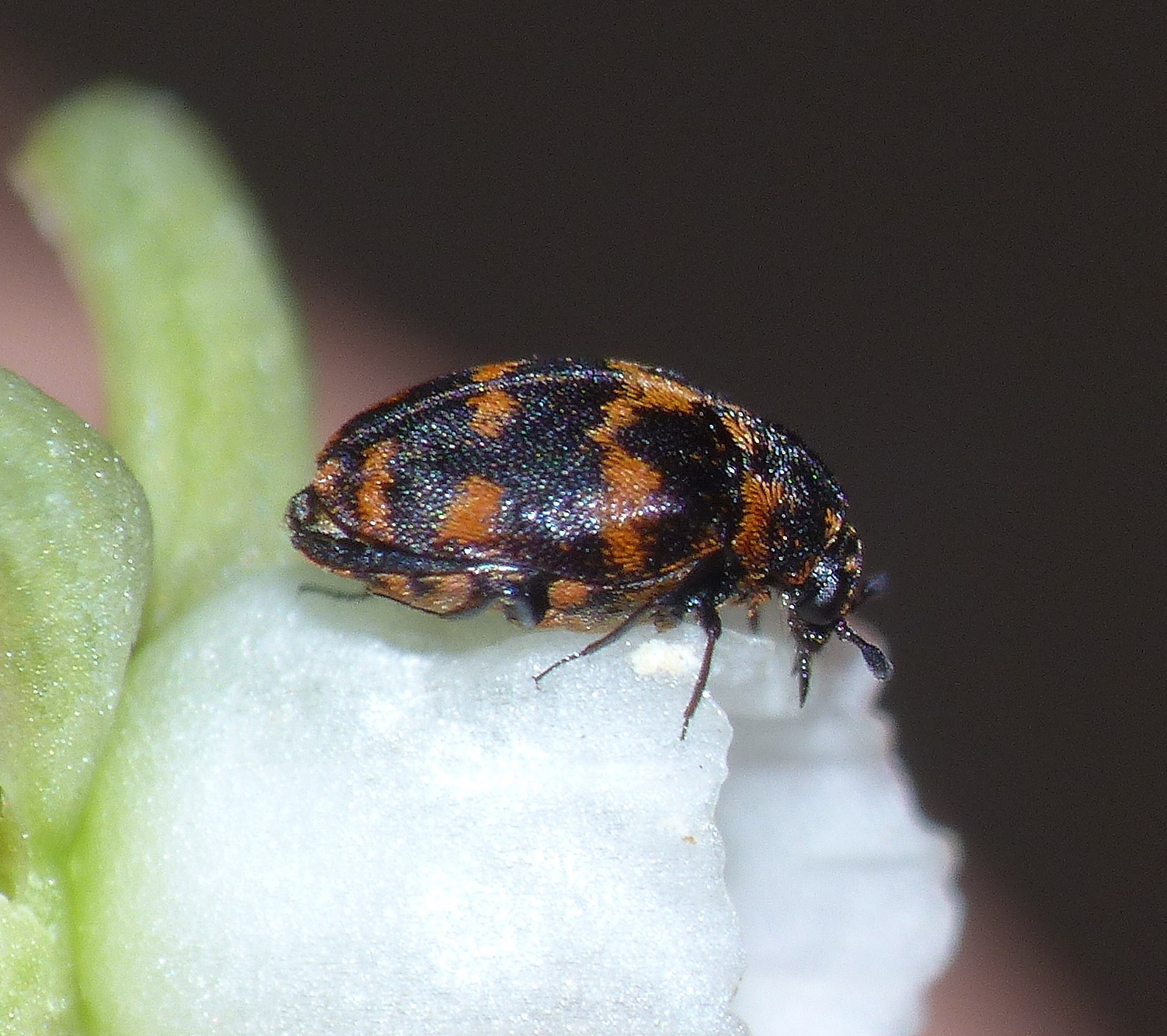
Lateral view of the beetle

This insect has a strongly convex body covered in scales, measuring between 2.2 and 2.6 mm in length and 1.5 to 1.75 mm in width. It has large convex eyes. The front of the head, including a central eye-like spot, is covered with dark brown scales. Both males and females have brown antennae with eleven segments, ending in a three-segmented club densely covered in brown fuzz. The pronotum is brown with yellowish-orange scales on the sides and front edges. The elytra are also adorned with dark brown and yellowish-orange scales, often forming three bands across their width.

Underneath, the abdomen has segments covered in a mix of yellowish-orange and brown scales, with the sides of segments I to V especially noticeable. The legs are brown with dark brown scales on top. The feet have two slightly curved claws. Male genitalia are characterized by parameres covered in short hairs, with a slightly curved apex. Abdominal segment IX is oval-shaped with short hairs, while abdominal segment VI is light-brown with different lengths of hairs along its edges and center.

== Etymology ==
The species name is dedicated to Małgorzata Kadej, the wife of Marcin Kadej, one of the authors who described the species.
