= Anthrenus kopeckyi =

Scientific classification
- Kingdom: Animalia
- Phylum: Arthropoda
- Class: Insecta
- Order: Coleoptera
- Suborder: Polyphaga
- Family: Dermestidae
- Genus: Anthrenus
- Subgenus: Nathrenus
- Species: A. kopeckyi

Binomial name
- Anthrenus kopeckyi Háva, 2017

Species of insects

Anthrenus (Nathrenus) kopeckyi is a species of carpet beetle found in Morocco.
