= Anthrenus kalimantanus =

Scientific classification
- Kingdom: Animalia
- Phylum: Arthropoda
- Class: Insecta
- Order: Coleoptera
- Suborder: Polyphaga
- Family: Dermestidae
- Genus: Anthrenus
- Subgenus: Nathrenus
- Species: A. kalimantanus

Binomial name
- Anthrenus kalimantanus Háva, 2004

Species of beetle

Anthrenus (Nathrenus) kalimantanus is a species of carpet beetle found in Indonesia (Kalimantan).
