= Anthrenus sabahense =

Scientific classification
- Kingdom: Animalia
- Phylum: Arthropoda
- Class: Insecta
- Order: Coleoptera
- Suborder: Polyphaga
- Family: Dermestidae
- Genus: Anthrenus
- Subgenus: Nathrenus
- Species: A. sabahense

Binomial name
- Anthrenus sabahense Háva, 2021

Species of beetle

Anthrenus (Nathrenus) sabahense is a species of carpet beetle found in Malaysia (Sabah).
