= Anthrenus cylindricornis =

Scientific classification
- Kingdom: Animalia
- Phylum: Arthropoda
- Class: Insecta
- Order: Coleoptera
- Suborder: Polyphaga
- Family: Dermestidae
- Genus: Anthrenus
- Subgenus: Nathrenus
- Species: A. cylindricornis

Binomial name
- Anthrenus cylindricornis Herrmann & Háva, 2014

Species of beetle

Anthrenus (Nathrenus) cylindricornis is a species of carpet beetle found in South Africa.
