= Anthrenus narani =

Scientific classification
- Kingdom: Animalia
- Phylum: Arthropoda
- Class: Insecta
- Order: Coleoptera
- Suborder: Polyphaga
- Family: Dermestidae
- Genus: Anthrenus
- Subgenus: Nathrenus
- Species: A. narani

Binomial name
- Anthrenus narani Háva & Ahmed, 2014

Species of insects

Anthrenus (Nathrenus) narani is a species of carpet beetle found in Pakistan.
