= Anthrenus cimrmani =

Scientific classification
- Kingdom: Animalia
- Phylum: Arthropoda
- Class: Insecta
- Order: Coleoptera
- Suborder: Polyphaga
- Family: Dermestidae
- Genus: Anthrenus
- Subgenus: Anthrenus
- Species: A. cimrmani

Binomial name
- Anthrenus cimrmani Háva, 2005

Species of beetle

Anthrenus cimrmani is a species of carpet beetle in the family Dermestidae. It is known from China (Hebei).
