= Anthrenus nocivus =

Scientific classification
- Kingdom: Animalia
- Phylum: Arthropoda
- Class: Insecta
- Order: Coleoptera
- Suborder: Polyphaga
- Family: Dermestidae
- Genus: Anthrenus
- Subgenus: Nathrenus
- Species: A. nocivus

Binomial name
- Anthrenus nocivus Mulsant & Godart, 1870

Species of beetle

Anthrenus (Nathrenus) nocivus is a species of carpet beetle found in Algeria.
