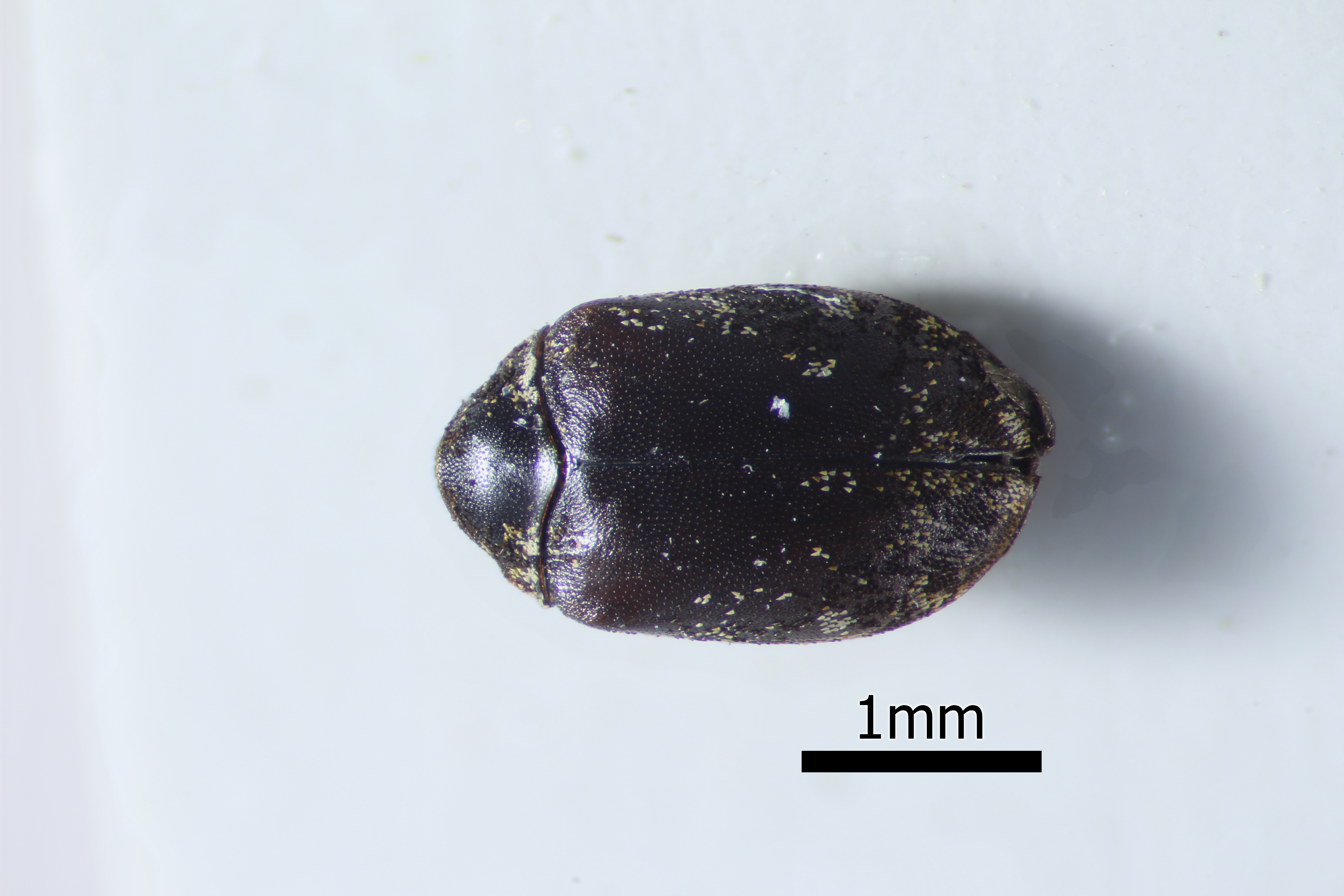

Scientific classification
- Kingdom: Animalia
- Phylum: Arthropoda
- Class: Insecta
- Order: Coleoptera
- Suborder: Polyphaga
- Family: Dermestidae
- Genus: Anthrenus
- Subgenus: Nathrenus
- Species: A. tryznai

Binomial name
- Anthrenus tryznai Háva, 2001

= Anthrenus tryznai =

Species of beetle

Anthrenus tryznai is a species of carpet beetle in the family Dermestidae. It is known from China (Tibet).
