= Anthrenus cordis =

Scientific classification
- Kingdom: Animalia
- Phylum: Arthropoda
- Class: Insecta
- Order: Coleoptera
- Suborder: Polyphaga
- Family: Dermestidae
- Genus: Anthrenus
- Subgenus: Nathrenus
- Species: A. cordis

Binomial name
- Anthrenus cordis Háva & Kadej, 2006

Species of beetle

Anthrenus (Nathrenus) cordis is a species of carpet beetle found in South Africa.
