= Anthrenus liliputianus =

Scientific classification
- Kingdom: Animalia
- Phylum: Arthropoda
- Class: Insecta
- Order: Coleoptera
- Suborder: Polyphaga
- Family: Dermestidae
- Genus: Anthrenus
- Subgenus: Nathrenus
- Species: A. liliputianus

Binomial name
- Anthrenus liliputianus Mulsant & Rey, 1868

Species of insects

Anthrenus (Nathrenus) liliputianus is a species of carpet beetle found in Egypt.

== Description ==
Prothorax black, adorned on each side with a border formed of white scales, covering the outer quarter of the base, and at least the outer third of the anterior edge without a black spot in the middle; marked with a spot of white scales on the median part of its base.

Elytra varying from black to reddish-brown; each adorned with a circle of two bands formed of white scales: the circle extending from the suture almost to the external edge and from halfway up the base to two-fifths: the first transverse band towards the middle: the second towards four-fifths of their length. Abdomen covered with white scales, with little or no mark near the anterior edge of the 2nd to 5th segments with a transverse blackish stripe.

Length: 1.3mm. Width: 1mm.

Head black, covered with whitish scales. Antennae extending to a third of the sides of the prothorax; with 11 segments, of which the last three form the club. Thorax and abdomen covered with white or ash-gray scales; the abdomen without or almost without spots on the sides of the segments. Legs reddish. Femora adorned with whitish scales.
