= Anthrenus gorki =

Scientific classification
- Kingdom: Animalia
- Phylum: Arthropoda
- Class: Insecta
- Order: Coleoptera
- Suborder: Polyphaga
- Family: Dermestidae
- Genus: Anthrenus
- Subgenus: Nathrenus
- Species: A. gorki

Binomial name
- Anthrenus gorki Háva, 2008

Species of beetle

Anthrenus (Nathrenus) gorki is a species of carpet beetle found in Azerbaijan, Greece, and Turkey.
