= Anthrenus longisetosus =

Scientific classification
- Kingdom: Animalia
- Phylum: Arthropoda
- Class: Insecta
- Order: Coleoptera
- Suborder: Polyphaga
- Family: Dermestidae
- Genus: Anthrenus
- Subgenus: Nathrenus
- Species: A. longisetosus

Binomial name
- Anthrenus longisetosus Kadej & Háva, 2015

Species of insects

Anthrenus (Nathrenus) longisetosus is a species of carpet beetle found in China (Jiangxi, Yunnan, and Zhejiang).
