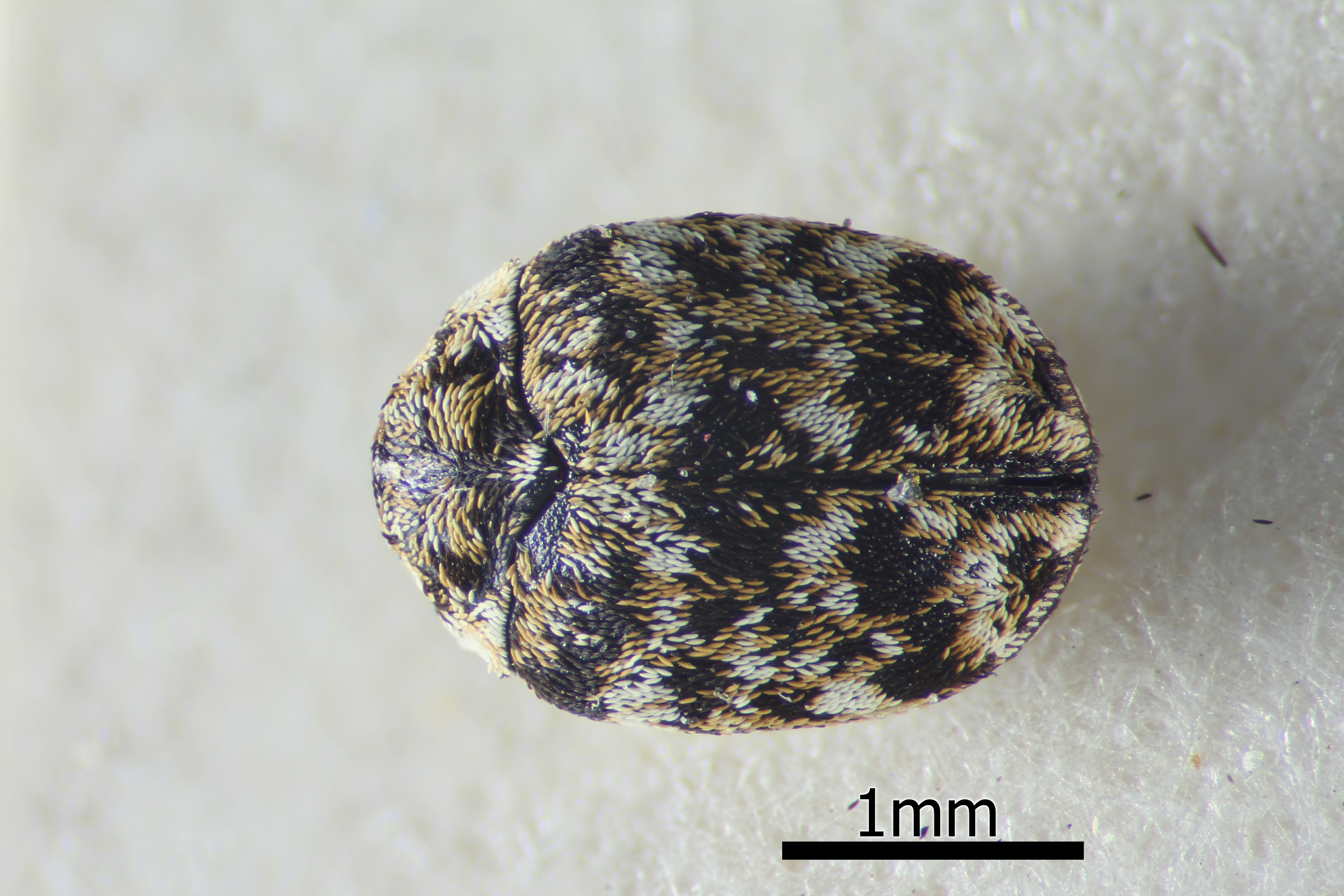

Scientific classification
- Kingdom: Animalia
- Phylum: Arthropoda
- Clade: Pancrustacea
- Class: Insecta
- Order: Coleoptera
- Suborder: Polyphaga
- Family: Dermestidae
- Genus: Anthrenus
- Subgenus: Nathrenus
- Species: A. capensis

Binomial name
- Anthrenus capensis Guérin–Méneville, 1835

= Anthrenus capensis =

Species of beetle

Anthrenus capensis is a species of carpet beetle in the family Dermestidae. The species is only known from South Africa.
