= Anthrenus kabakovi =

Scientific classification
- Kingdom: Animalia
- Phylum: Arthropoda
- Class: Insecta
- Order: Coleoptera
- Suborder: Polyphaga
- Family: Dermestidae
- Genus: Anthrenus
- Subgenus: Nathrenus
- Species: A. kabakovi

Binomial name
- Anthrenus kabakovi Kadej & Háva, 2016

Species of insects

Anthrenus (Nathrenus) kabakovi is a species of carpet beetle found in Vietnam.
