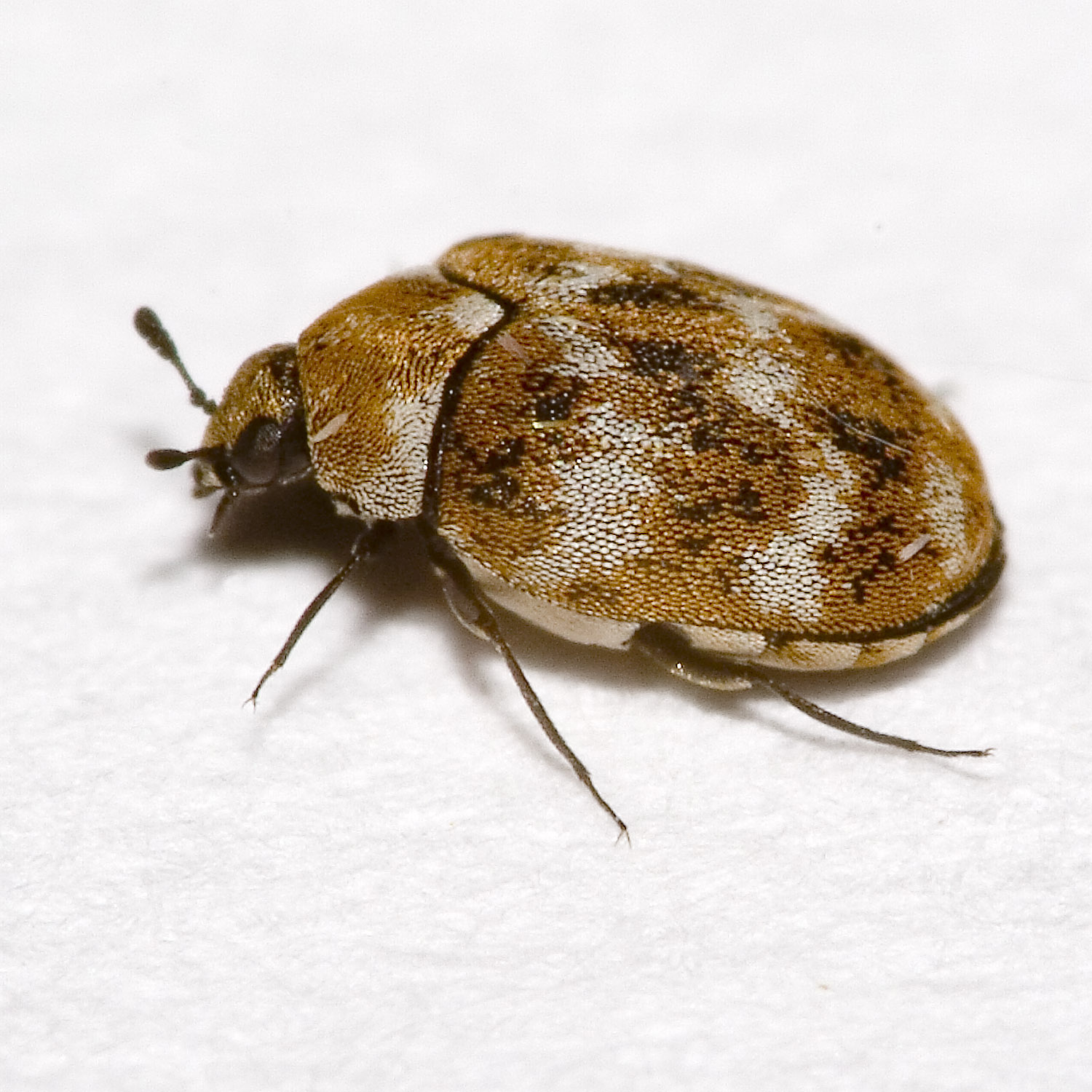
- Young imago of Anthrenus verbasci

Scientific classification
- Kingdom: Animalia
- Phylum: Arthropoda
- Clade: Pancrustacea
- Class: Insecta
- Order: Coleoptera
- Suborder: Polyphaga
- Family: Dermestidae
- Tribe: Anthrenini
- Genus: Anthrenus; Geoffroy, 1762

Subgenera
- Anthrenodes Chobaut, 1898; Anthrenops Reitter, 1881; Anthrenus Geoffroy, 1762; Florilinus Mulsant & Rey, 1868; Helocerus Mulsant & Rey, 1868; Nathrenus Casey, 1900; Peacockia Menier & Villemant, 1993; Ranthenus Mroczkowski, 1962; Setapeacockia Háva, 2008; Solskinus Mroczkowski, 1962

= Anthrenus =

Genus of beetles

Anthrenus is a genus of beetles in the Dermestidae family, skin beetles. One of several genera of carpet beetles, Anthrenus was historically placed in a subfamily Anthreninae, though presently included in the Megatominae. The genus Neoanthrenus is closely related.

Anthrenus carpet beetles are small beetles a few (1.8-4mm) millimeters long with a rounded shape. Their antennae bear small clubs at the end, which are larger in the males than in females. Many have a delicate pattern, with a dark body covered in colorful scales of various brown, tan, red, whitish and grey hues. These scales rub off easily and old individuals are often partially devoid of them, showing the shining black elytra. A considerable number of subspecies and varieties have been named, but it is questionable whether these are all valid or simply refer to such age-related differences. The massive number of species has been divided into several subgenera, but these are not too firmly established. The small subgenus Helocerus for example is sometimes entirely included in Florilinus. Also, new species are being described every now and then.

The majority of species associated with this genus are found in the semiarid regions of Europe, Asia, and Africa, however the species commonly found indoors as pests are found worldwide. Most species are harmless pollen-eaters, with the long-haired larvae feeding on a wide range of dead animal or plant matter making them important decomposers. Some however, most notably the museum beetle (A. museorum), are significant pests infesting stored goods and especially biological specimens in museum collections. Their larvae may cause considerable damage to wool, fur, feathers, and natural history collections. Due to their larvae feeding on natural fibers they can be found laying eggs in carpets, hence the common name carpet beetles.

Primarily this genus breeds in the spring and the summer months living in temperate regions. They are found worldwide due to distribution and are presumed to have arrived in North America in the 1850s. In the wild adult carpet beetles are commonly found on flowering plants or occupying bird nests (such as sparrows and swallows) and bat roosts, though now more commonly as household pests.

== Taxonomy ==
According to World Dermestidae catalogue (Jiří Háva, 2023), following taxonomic division is proposed for Anthrenus and related groups of Dermestidae, including Anthrenus and related genera:

- Dermestidae
  - Megatominae
    - Anthrenini
      - Anthrenina
        - Anthrenus
          - Anthrenodes
          - Anthrenops
          - Anthrenus s. str.
          - Florilinus
          - Helocerus
          - Nathrenus
          - Peacockia
          - Ranthenus
          - Setapeacockia
          - Solskinus
      - Dermeanthrenina
        - Dermeanthrenus
    - Megatomini
    - Ctesiini
  - other Dermestidae subfamilies

== Species ==
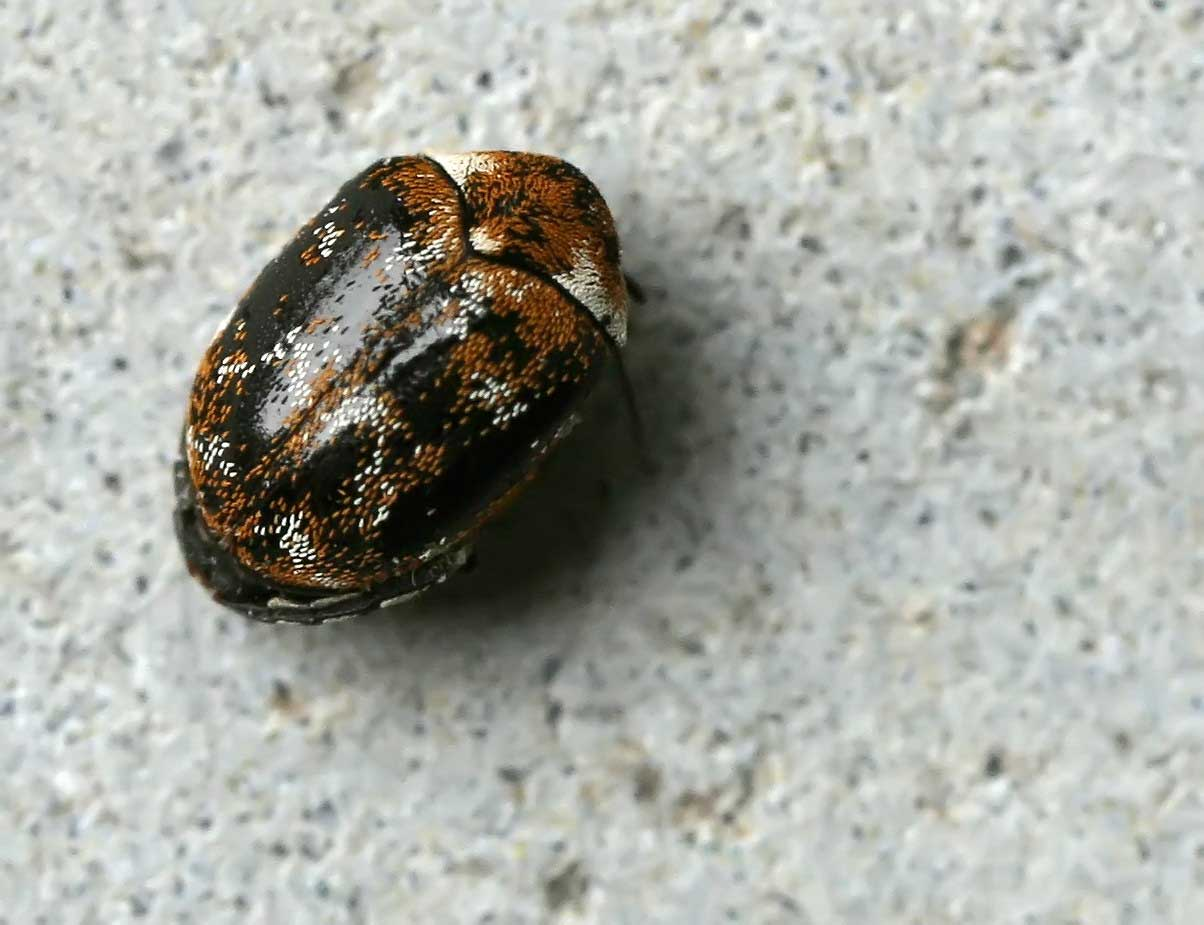
Old varied carpet beetle (A. verbasci) with most scales rubbed off

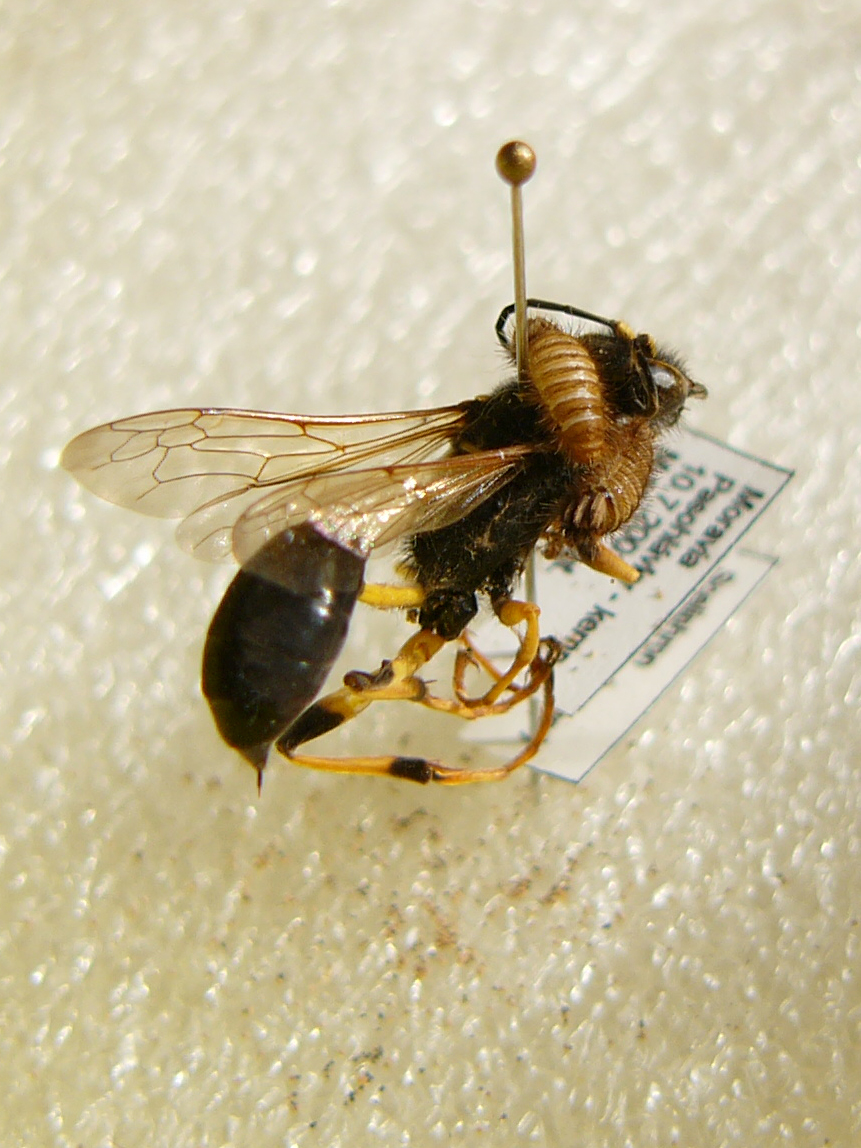
Anthrenus larvae feeding on Sceliphron destillatorium specimen

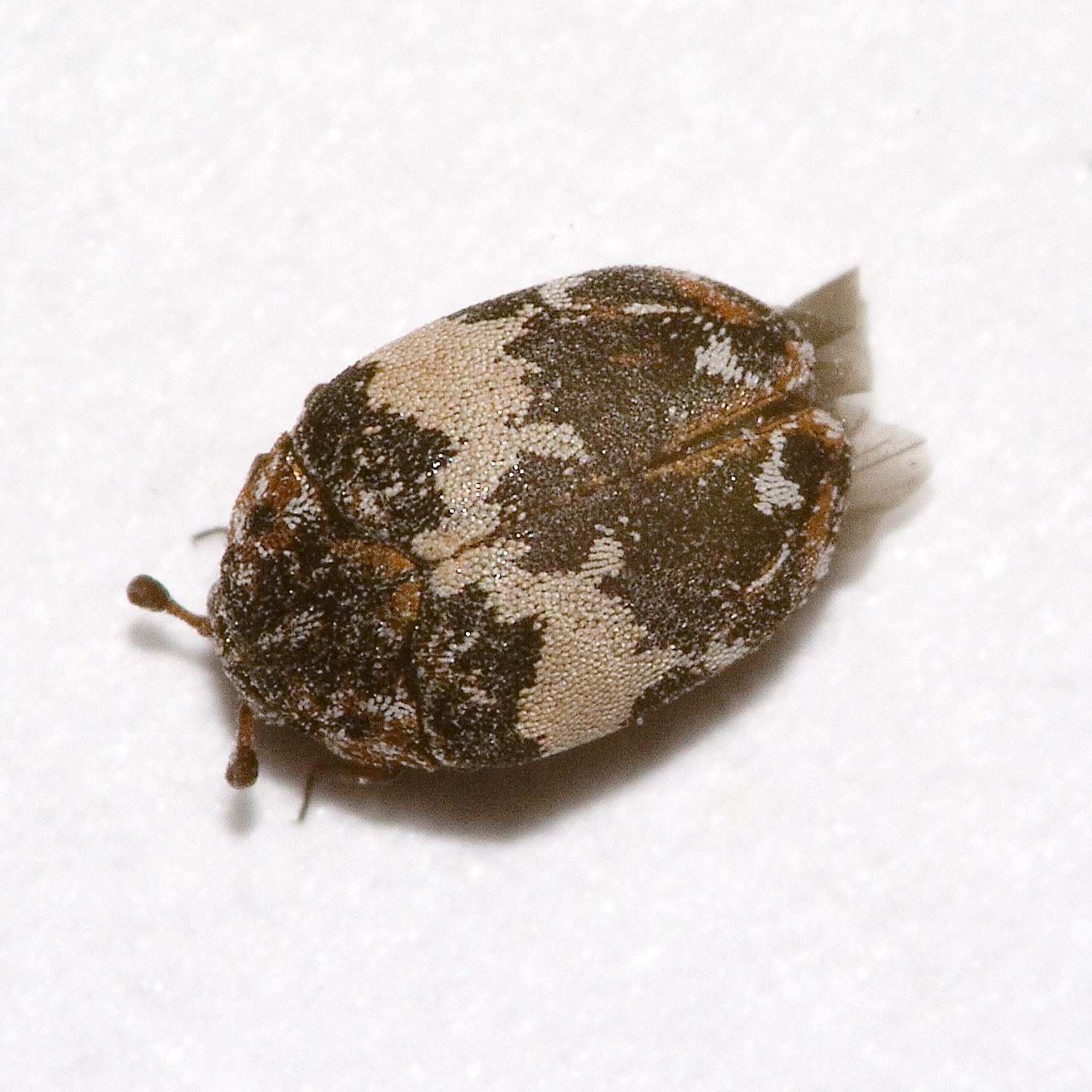
Anthrenus pimpinellae, probably male

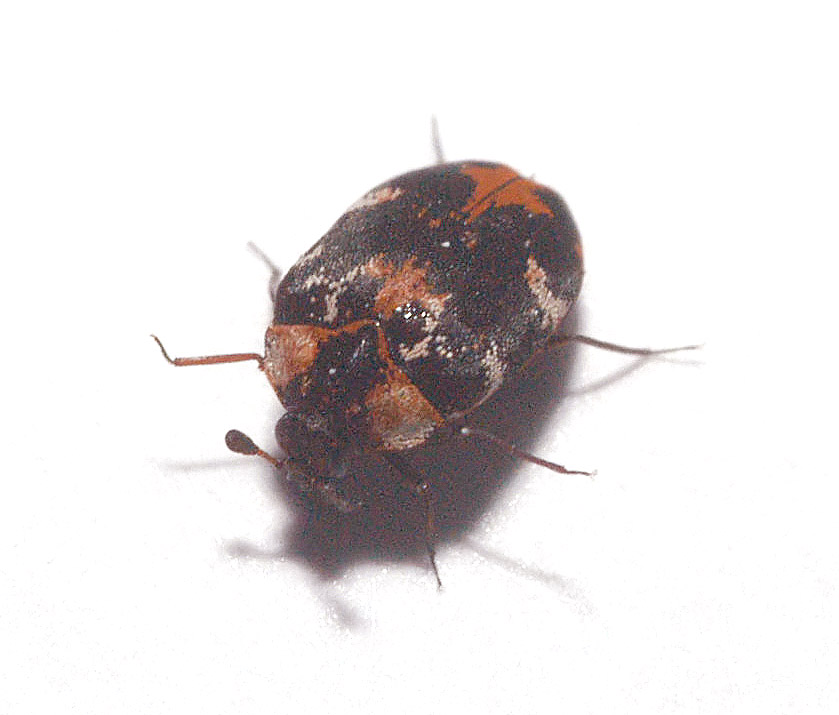
common carpet beetle (A. scrophulariae), probably male

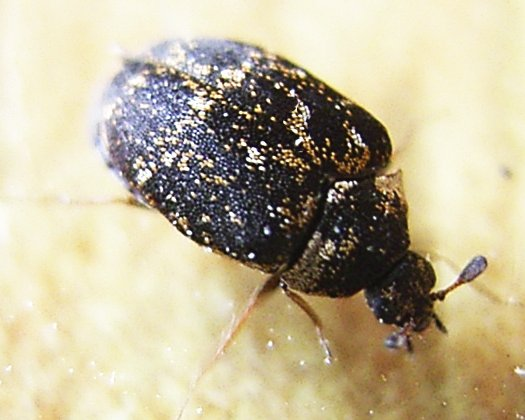
museum beetle (A. museorum), male

Anthrenus contains the following species:

- Anthrenus aegyptiacus Pic, 1899
- Anthrenus afer Péringuey, 1886
- Anthrenus alatauensis Mroczkowski, 1962
- Anthrenus albomaculatus Pic, 1927
- Anthrenus albonotatus Pic, 1922
- Anthrenus albostictus Reitter, 1881
- Anthrenus almatyensis Háva, 2018
- Anthrenus amandae Holloway, 2019
- †Anthrenus ambericus Háva, Prokop & Herrmann, 2006
- Anthrenus amoenulus Reitter, 1896
- Anthrenus angustefasciatus Ganglbauer, 1904
- Anthrenus aradensis Mawlood & Abdul-Rassoul, 2003
- Anthrenus araxensis Zhantiev, 1976
- Anthrenus ardoi Kadej & Háva, 2011
- Anthrenus armstrongielus Kadej & Háva, 2013
- Anthrenus arndti Háva, 2005
- Anthrenus assimilis Zhantiev, 1976
- Anthrenus aterrimus (Gerstäcker, 1871)
- Anthrenus auratus Zhantiev, 1979
- Anthrenus bactrianus Zhantiev, 2004
- Anthrenus bajtenovi Sokolov, 1974
- Anthrenus barclayi Háva, 2019
- Anthrenus bartolozzii Háva, 2003
- Anthrenus basilewskyi Kalík, 1965
- Anthrenus beali Zhantiev, 2004
- Anthrenus becvari Háva, 2004
- Anthrenus bellulus Chobaut, 1897
- Anthrenus bezdeki Háva, 2017
- Anthrenus bilyi Háva, 2000
- Anthrenus biskrensis Reitter, 1887
- Anthrenus blanci Beal, 1998
- Anthrenus bobo Háva, 2003
- Anthrenus bomiensis Háva, 2004
- Anthrenus botswaniensis Háva & Kadej, 2006
- Anthrenus boyesi Háva, 2004
- Anthrenus bucharicus Zhantiev, 1976
- Anthrenus buettikeri Mroczkowski, 1980
- Anthrenus bulirschi Háva, 2000
- Anthrenus capensis Guérin-Méneville, 1835
- Anthrenus cardamom Háva, 2001
- Anthrenus castaneae Melsheimer, 1844
- Anthrenus caucasicus Reitter, 1881
- Anthrenus cechovskyi Háva & Kadej, 2015
- Anthrenus cervenkai Háva & Herrmann, 2006
- Anthrenus ceylonicus Kadej & Háva, 2006
- Anthrenus chiton Beal, 1998
- Anthrenus cimrmani Háva, 2005
- Anthrenus coacheorum Háva, 2022
- Anthrenus coloratus Reitter, 1881
- Anthrenus consobrinus (Háva, 2005)
- Anthrenus constantini Háva & Herrmann, 2006
- Anthrenus cordis Háva & Kadej, 2006
- Anthrenus coreanus Mroczkowski, 1966
- Anthrenus cornelli Háva & Herrmann, 2008
- Anthrenus corona Holloway, 2021
- Anthrenus crustaceus Reitter, 1881
- Anthrenus cylindricornis Herrmann & Háva, 2014
- Anthrenus danielssoni Háva, 2007
- Anthrenus darjeelingi Háva, 2020
- Anthrenus debilis Háva, 2005
- Anthrenus delicatus Kiesenwetter, 1851
- Anthrenus difficilis Háva, 2005
- Anthrenus distinctus Kadej & Háva, 2006
- Anthrenus dsungaricus Mroczkowski, 1962
- Anthrenus edopetri Háva, 2004
- Anthrenus eichleri Kadej & Háva, 2006
- †Anthrenus electron Háva, Prokop & Kadej, 2006
- Anthrenus emili Herrmann & Háva, 2019
- Anthrenus endroedyi Háva, 2003
- Anthrenus ethiopicus Háva, 2004
- Anthrenus exilis Mulsant & Rey, 1868
- Anthrenus farsicus Kadej & Háva, 2011
- Anthrenus fernandezi Háva, 2003
- Anthrenus festivus Erichson, 1846
- Anthrenus flavidulus Reitter, 1889
- Anthrenus flavidus Solsky, 1876
- Anthrenus flavipes LeConte, 1854
- Anthrenus frater Arrow, 1915
- Anthrenus fucosus Beal, 1998
- Anthrenus fugong Háva, 2019
- Anthrenus funebris Reitter, 1889
- Anthrenus fuscus Olivier, 1789
- Anthrenus geisthardti Háva & Herrmann, 2006
- Anthrenus gobicus Zhantiev, 2004
- Anthrenus goliath Saulcy, 1868
- Anthrenus gorki Háva, 2008
- Anthrenus gracilis Zhantiev, 2004
- †Anthrenus groehni Háva, Prokop & Herrmann, 2006
- Anthrenus guineaensis Háva, 2004
- Anthrenus hartmanni Háva, 2000
- Anthrenus havai Kadej & Jakubska, 2007
- Anthrenus heptamerus Peyerimhoff, 1924
- Anthrenus herrmanni Kadej & Háva, 2016
- Anthrenus himalayensis Háva, Wachkoo & Maqbool, 2019
- Anthrenus hissaricus Mroczkowski, 1961
- Anthrenus hoberlandti Kadej, Háva & Kalík, 2007
- Anthrenus hrdlickai Háva, 2016
- Anthrenus hulai Háva, 2017
- Anthrenus indicus Kadej, Háva & Kalík, 2007
- Anthrenus ineptus Háva & Tezcan, 2004
- Anthrenus isabellinus Küster, 1848
- Anthrenus israelicus Háva, 2004
- Anthrenus jacobsoni Zhantiev, 1976
- Anthrenus jakli Háva, 2001
- Anthrenus japonicus Ohbayashi, 1985
- Anthrenus jelineki Háva, 2009
- Anthrenus jordanicus Pic, 1934
- Anthrenus kabakovi Kadej & Háva, 2016
- Anthrenus kabateki Háva, 2014
- Anthrenus kadeji Herrmann & Háva, 2009
- Anthrenus kafkai Kadej & Háva, 2011
- Anthrenus kaliki Pic, 1952
- Anthrenus kalimantanus Háva, 2004
- Anthrenus kantneri Háva, 2003
- Anthrenus kaszabi Zhantiev, 1973
- Anthrenus katerinae Háva & Kadej, 2006
- Anthrenus katmandui Kadej, Háva & Kitano, 2016
- Anthrenus katrinkrauseae Háva, 2018
- Anthrenus kejvali Háva, 2000
- Anthrenus kenyaensis Háva, 2004
- †Anthrenus kerneggeri Háva, Prokop & Herrmann, 2008
- Anthrenus king (Háva, 2002)
- Anthrenus klapperichi Kadej & Háva, 2006
- Anthrenus klichai Herrmann, Kadej & Háva, 2016
- Anthrenus knizeki Háva, 2004
- Anthrenus kompantzevi Zhantiev, 2004
- Anthrenus kopeckyi Háva, 2017
- Anthrenus kourili Háva, 2006
- Anthrenus kryzhanovskii Sokolov, 1979
- Anthrenus kubistai Háva & Votruba, 2005
- Anthrenus kucerai Háva, 2005
- †Anthrenus larvalis Cockerell, 1917
- Anthrenus latefasciatus Reitter, 1892
- Anthrenus lepidus LeConte, 1854
- Anthrenus leucogrammus Solsky, 1876
- Anthrenus liliputianus Mulsant & Rey, 1868
- Anthrenus lilligi Háva & Herrmann, 2008
- Anthrenus lindbergi Mroczkowski, 1959
- Anthrenus linnavuorii Háva, 2014
- Anthrenus loebli Kadej & Háva, 2010
- Anthrenus longisetosus Kadej & Háva, 2015
- Anthrenus longus Arrow, 1915
- Anthrenus lopatini Zhantiev, 1976
- Anthrenus luteovestitus (Pic, 1937)
- Anthrenus macqueeni (Armstrong, 1949)
- Anthrenus maculatus Fabricius, 1798
- Anthrenus maculifer Reitter, 1881
- Anthrenus maharashtranus Háva, 2002
- Anthrenus malawicus Háva, 2004
- Anthrenus malkini Mroczkowski, 1980
- Anthrenus maltzi Kadej, 2010
- Anthrenus margarethae Háva & Kadej, 2006
- Anthrenus medvedevi Zhantiev, 2006
- Anthrenus megalops Arrow, 1915
- Anthrenus mendax Háva, 2006
- Anthrenus merkli Háva, 2003
- Anthrenus mesopotamicus Háva, 2001
- Anthrenus milkoi Zhantiev, 2004
- Anthrenus mindanaoensis Háva, 2004
- Anthrenus miniatulus Reitter, 1899
- Anthrenus miniopictus Bedel, 1884
- Anthrenus minor Wollaston, 1865
- Anthrenus minutus Erichson, 1846
- Anthrenus molitor Aubé, 1850
- Anthrenus mongolicus Zhantiev, 1973
- Anthrenus moroccanus Háva, 2015
- Anthrenus mroczkowskii Kalík, 1954
- Anthrenus mugodsharicus Sokolov, 1974
- Anthrenus munroi Hinton, 1943
- Anthrenus museorum (Linnaeus, 1761)
- Anthrenus nadeini Kadej & Háva, 2008
- Anthrenus nahiricus Zhantiev, 1976
- Anthrenus namibicus Háva, 2000
- Anthrenus narani Háva & Ahmed, 2014
- Anthrenus natalensis Háva, 2004
- Anthrenus nepalensis Kadej & Háva, 2012
- Anthrenus nideki Háva, 2005
- Anthrenus nipponensis Kalík & Ohbayashi, 1985
- Anthrenus niveosparsus (Armstrong, 1941)
- Anthrenus nocivus Mulsant & Godart, 1870
- Anthrenus noctua Háva, 2005
- Anthrenus obenbergeri Háva & Herrmann, 2021
- Anthrenus oberthueri Reitter, 1881
- Anthrenus obscurus Thunberg, 1815
- Anthrenus occultus Háva, 2006
- Anthrenus oceanicus Fauvel, 1903
- Anthrenus ocellifer Blackburn, 1891
- Anthrenus oculatus Arrow, 1937
- Anthrenus ohbayashii Kadej, Háva & Kitano, 2016
- Anthrenus olgae Kalík, 1946
- Anthrenus omoi Beal, 1998
- Anthrenus orientalis Motschulsky, 1851
- Anthrenus pacificus Fairmaire, 1850
- Anthrenus palaeoaegyptiacus Grüss, 1930
- Anthrenus pallidus Sokolov, 1974
- Anthrenus paraclaviger Háva & Kadej, 2008
- Anthrenus parallelus (Armstrong, 1941)
- Anthrenus paramolitor Herrmann & Háva, 2021
- Anthrenus parthicus Zhantiev, 1976
- Anthrenus paulyi Háva, 2003
- Anthrenus perak Háva, 2016
- Anthrenus pfefferi Kalík, 1954
- Anthrenus picturatus Solsky, 1876
- Anthrenus pilosus Pic, 1923
- Anthrenus pimpinellae (Fabricius, 1775)
- Anthrenus poggii Háva, 2002
- Anthrenus polonicus Mroczkowski, 1951
- Anthrenus preissi Háva & Herrmann, 2003
- Anthrenus propinquus Háva, 2005
- Anthrenus prudeki Háva, 2002
- Anthrenus pubifer Reitter, 1899
- Anthrenus pueblanus Háva, 2021
- Anthrenus pulaskii Kadej, 2011
- Anthrenus pulchellus Gestro, 1889
- Anthrenus purcharti Háva, 2014
- Anthrenus pushkini Herrmann, Kadej & Háva, 2016
- Anthrenus qinlingensis Háva, 2004
- Anthrenus rauterbergi Reitter, 1908
- Anthrenus rotundulus Reitter, 1889
- Anthrenus sabahense Háva, 2021
- Anthrenus safad Háva, 2013
- Anthrenus sarnicus Mroczkowski, 1963
- Anthrenus schawalleri Háva & Kadej, 2006
- Anthrenus scrophulariae (Linnaeus, 1758)
- Anthrenus seideli Háva, 2021
- Anthrenus semenovi Zhantiev, 1976
- Anthrenus seminulum Arrow, 1915
- Anthrenus senegalensis Pic, 1927
- Anthrenus shikokensis Ohbayashi, 1985
- Anthrenus sichuanicus Háva, 2004
- Anthrenus signatus Erichson, 1846
- Anthrenus similaris Kadej, Háva & Kalík, 2007
- Anthrenus similis Zhantiev, 1976
- Anthrenus simonis Reitter, 1881
- Anthrenus sinensis Arrow, 1915
- Anthrenus smetanai Kadej & Háva, 2011
- Anthrenus snizeki Háva, 2004
- Anthrenus socotranus Háva, 2017
- Anthrenus sogdianus Zhantiev, 1976
- Anthrenus solskianus Sokolov, 1974
- Anthrenus sophonisba Beal, 1998
- Anthrenus sordidulus Reitter, 1889
- Anthrenus sparsutus Fairmaire, 1850
- Anthrenus splendidus Háva, 2004
- Anthrenus stelma Kadej & Háva, 2006
- Anthrenus strakai Herrmann & Háva, 2012
- Anthrenus subclaviger Reitter, 1881
- Anthrenus subsetosus Arrow, 1915
- Anthrenus svatopluki Kadej & Háva, 2013
- Anthrenus sveci Háva, 2004
- Anthrenus tadzhicus Mroczkowski, 1961
- Anthrenus taiwanicus Kadej, Háva & Kitano, 2016
- Anthrenus talassicus Sokolov, 1980
- Anthrenus tanakai Ohbayashi, 1985
- Anthrenus taricus Zhantiev, 2006
- Anthrenus tarnawskii Kadej & Háva, 2006
- Anthrenus thoracicus Melsheimer, 1844
- Anthrenus transcaspicus Mroczkowski, 1960
- Anthrenus tryznai Háva, 2001
- Anthrenus turnai Háva, 2004
- Anthrenus tuvensis Zhantiev, 1976
- Anthrenus umbellatarum Chobaut, 1898
- Anthrenus umbra Beal, 1998
- Anthrenus undatus Reitter, 1881
- Anthrenus ussuricus Zhantiev, 1988
- Anthrenus verbasci (Linnaeus, 1767)
- Anthrenus versicolor Reitter, 1887
- Anthrenus vijaii Veer, 2011
- Anthrenus viktorai Háva, 2016
- Anthrenus vladimiri Menier & Villemant, 1993
- Anthrenus warchalowskii Kadej, Háva & Kalík, 2007
- Anthrenus wittmeri Mroczkowski, 1980
- Anthrenus x-signum Reitter, 1881
- Anthrenus zagrosensis Háva, 2004
- Anthrenus zahradniki Háva, 2003
- Anthrenus zebra Reitter, 1889
- Anthrenus zeravshanicus Sokolov, 1979
- Anthrenus zhantievi Háva & Kadej, 2006
