= Anthrenus maltzi =

Scientific classification
- Kingdom: Animalia
- Phylum: Arthropoda
- Class: Insecta
- Order: Coleoptera
- Suborder: Polyphaga
- Family: Dermestidae
- Genus: Anthrenus
- Subgenus: Nathrenus
- Species: A. maltzi

Binomial name
- Anthrenus maltzi Kadej, 2010

Species of insects

Anthrenus (Nathrenus) maltzi is a species of carpet beetle found in Angola.
