= Anthrenus obscurus =

Scientific classification
- Kingdom: Animalia
- Phylum: Arthropoda
- Class: Insecta
- Order: Coleoptera
- Suborder: Polyphaga
- Family: Dermestidae
- Genus: Anthrenus
- Subgenus: Nathrenus
- Species: A. obscurus

Binomial name
- Anthrenus obscurus Thunberg, 1815

Species of beetle

Anthrenus (Nathrenus) obscurus is a species of carpet beetle found in South Africa.
