= Anthrenus stelma =

Scientific classification
- Kingdom: Animalia
- Phylum: Arthropoda
- Class: Insecta
- Order: Coleoptera
- Suborder: Polyphaga
- Family: Dermestidae
- Genus: Anthrenus
- Subgenus: Nathrenus
- Species: A. stelma

Binomial name
- Anthrenus stelma Kadej & Háva, 2006

Species of beetle

Anthrenus (Nathrenus) stelma is a species of carpet beetle found in Namibia.
