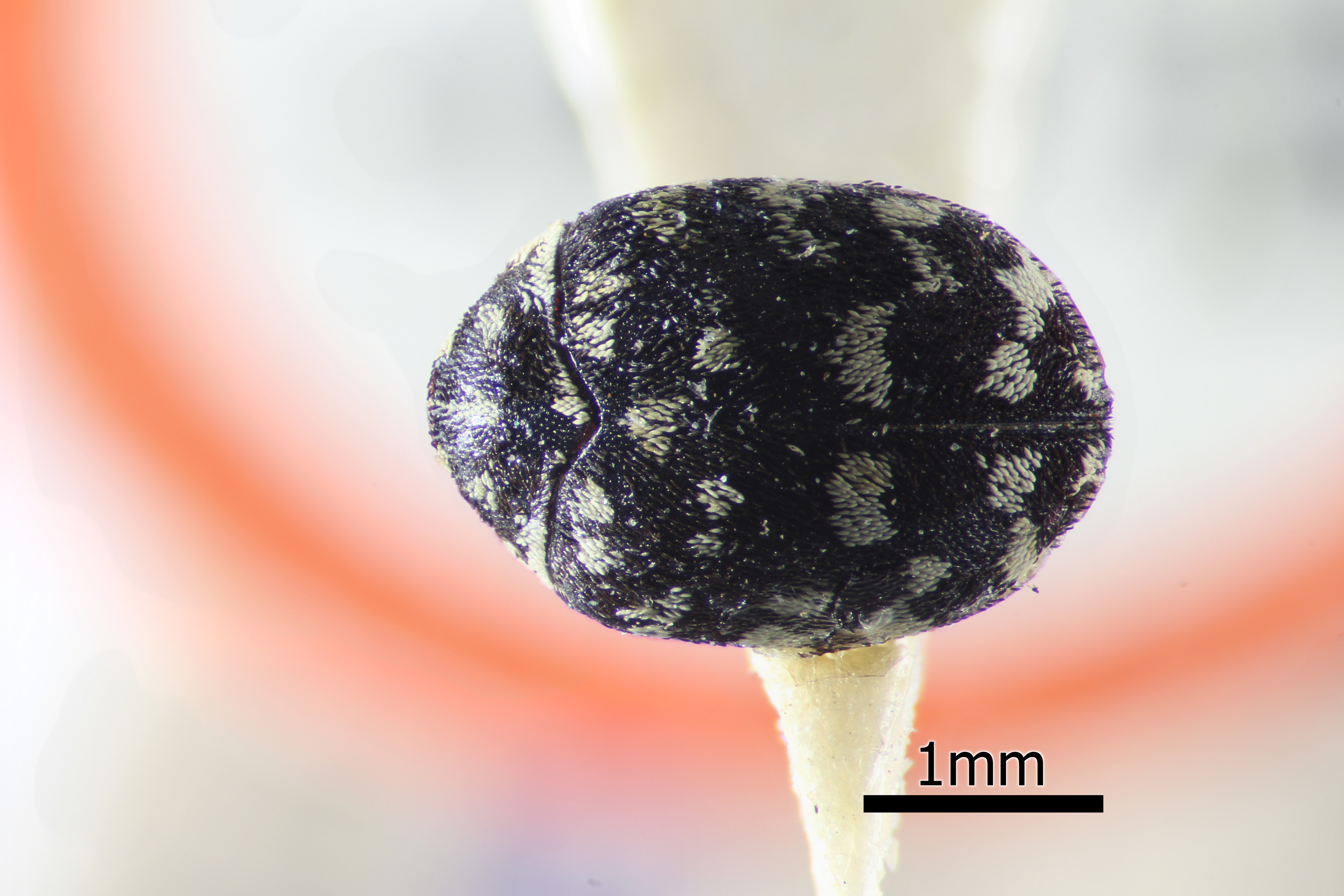

Scientific classification
- Kingdom: Animalia
- Phylum: Arthropoda
- Class: Insecta
- Order: Coleoptera
- Suborder: Polyphaga
- Family: Dermestidae
- Genus: Anthrenus
- Subgenus: Nathrenus
- Species: A. boyesi

Binomial name
- Anthrenus boyesi Háva, 2004

Synonyms
- Anthrenus multisignatus Kalik (un): Háva & Kadej, 2006; Anthrenus melagrinus (un): Háva & Kadej, 2006

= Anthrenus boyesi =

Species of beetle

Anthrenus boyesi is a species of carpet beetle in the subgenus Nathrenus of the genus Anthrenus, family Dermestidae. It is known from Congo, Malawi, Swaziland, Zimbabwe, and South Africa (Cape, Namaqualand, Natal, Transvaal, Zululand).
