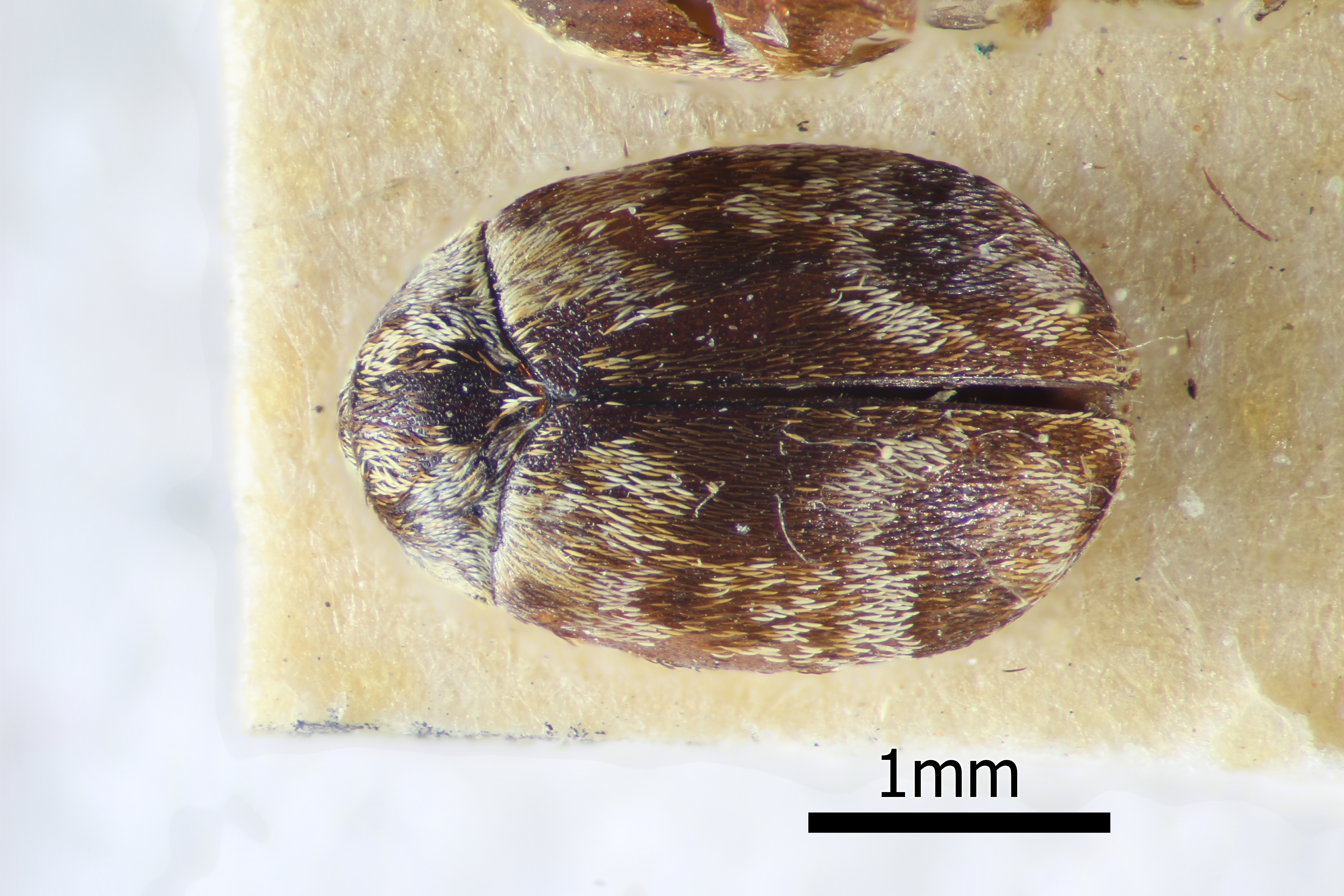

Scientific classification
- Kingdom: Animalia
- Phylum: Arthropoda
- Class: Insecta
- Order: Coleoptera
- Suborder: Polyphaga
- Family: Dermestidae
- Genus: Anthrenus
- Subgenus: Nathrenus
- Species: A. subsetosus

Binomial name
- Anthrenus subsetosus Arrow, 1915

= Anthrenus subsetosus =

Species of beetle

Anthrenus subsetosus is a species of carpet beetle in the family Dermestidae. It is known from Myanmar and Vietnam.
