= Anthrenus biskrensis =

Scientific classification
- Kingdom: Animalia
- Phylum: Arthropoda
- Class: Insecta
- Order: Coleoptera
- Suborder: Polyphaga
- Family: Dermestidae
- Genus: Anthrenus
- Subgenus: Nathrenus
- Species: A. biskrensis

Binomial name
- Anthrenus biskrensis Reitter, 1887

Species of beetle

Anthrenus (Nathrenus) biskrensis is a species of carpet beetle found in Italy (Lampedusa, Lipari, Sicily), Malta, Spain, Algeria, Libya, Morocco, and Tunisia.
