= Anthrenus edopetri =

Scientific classification
- Kingdom: Animalia
- Phylum: Arthropoda
- Class: Insecta
- Order: Coleoptera
- Suborder: Polyphaga
- Family: Dermestidae
- Genus: Anthrenus
- Subgenus: Nathrenus
- Species: A. edopetri

Binomial name
- Anthrenus edopetri Háva, 2004

Species of beetle

Anthrenus (Nathrenus) edopetri is a species of carpet beetle found in Laos and Thailand.
