= Anthrenus zeravshanicus =

Scientific classification
- Kingdom: Animalia
- Phylum: Arthropoda
- Class: Insecta
- Order: Coleoptera
- Suborder: Polyphaga
- Family: Dermestidae
- Genus: Anthrenus
- Subgenus: Ranthenus
- Species: A. zeravshanicus

Binomial name
- Anthrenus zeravshanicus Sokolov, 1979

Species of beetle

Anthrenus zeravshanicus is a species of carpet beetle in the family Dermestidae. It is known from Tajikistan.
