= Anthrenus preissi =

Scientific classification
- Kingdom: Animalia
- Phylum: Arthropoda
- Class: Insecta
- Order: Coleoptera
- Suborder: Polyphaga
- Family: Dermestidae
- Genus: Anthrenus
- Subgenus: Nathrenus
- Species: A. preissi

Binomial name
- Anthrenus preissi Háva & Herrmann, 2003

Species of beetle

Anthrenus (Nathrenus) preissi is a species of carpet beetle found in Indonesia (Kalimantan, Sumatra).
