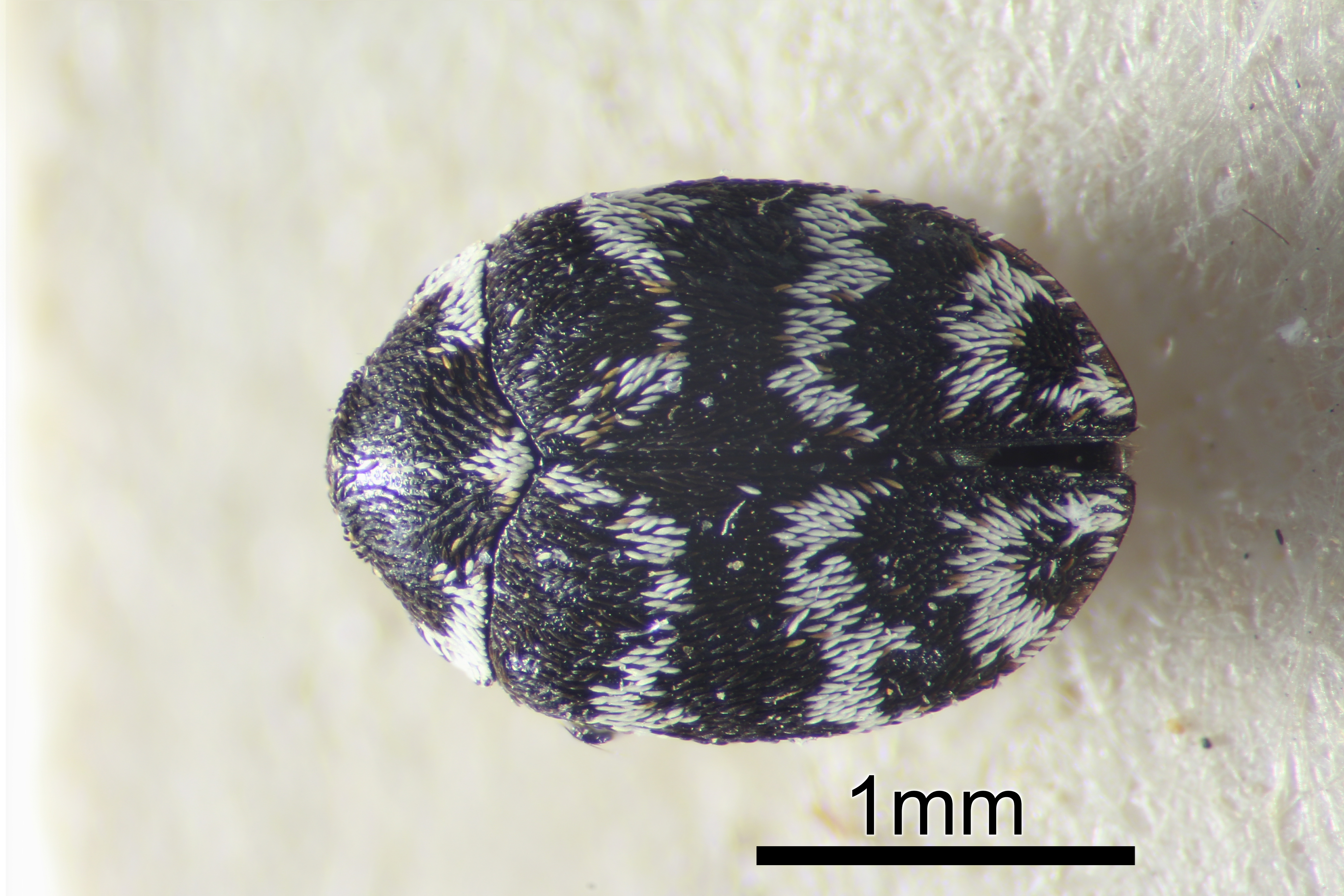

Scientific classification
- Kingdom: Animalia
- Phylum: Arthropoda
- Class: Insecta
- Order: Coleoptera
- Suborder: Polyphaga
- Family: Dermestidae
- Genus: Anthrenus
- Subgenus: Nathrenus
- Species: A. albostictus

Binomial name
- Anthrenus albostictus Reitter, 1881

= Anthrenus albostictus =

Species of beetle

Anthrenus albostictus is a species of carpet beetle in the family Dermestidae. It is known from South Africa.
