= Anthrenus zahradniki =

Scientific classification
- Kingdom: Animalia
- Phylum: Arthropoda
- Clade: Pancrustacea
- Class: Insecta
- Order: Coleoptera
- Suborder: Polyphaga
- Family: Dermestidae
- Genus: Anthrenus
- Subgenus: Nathrenus
- Species: A. zahradniki

Binomial name
- Anthrenus zahradniki Háva, 2003

Species of beetle

Anthrenus (Nathrenus) zahradniki is a species of carpet beetle found in Greece (Chios, Rhodes), Lebanon, Turkey, and Cyprus.
