= Anthrenus undatus =

Scientific classification
- Kingdom: Animalia
- Phylum: Arthropoda
- Class: Insecta
- Order: Coleoptera
- Suborder: Polyphaga
- Family: Dermestidae
- Genus: Anthrenus
- Subgenus: Nathrenus
- Species: A. undatus

Binomial name
- Anthrenus undatus Reitter, 1881

Species of beetle

Anthrenus (Nathrenus) undatus is a species of carpet beetle found in South Africa.
