= Anthrenus purcharti =

Scientific classification
- Kingdom: Animalia
- Phylum: Arthropoda
- Class: Insecta
- Order: Coleoptera
- Suborder: Polyphaga
- Family: Dermestidae
- Genus: Anthrenus
- Subgenus: Nathrenus
- Species: A. purcharti

Binomial name
- Anthrenus purcharti Háva, 2014

Species of beetle

Anthrenus (Nathrenus) purcharti is a species of carpet beetle found in Yemen, specifically on the island of Socotra.
