= Anthrenus bulirschi =

Scientific classification
- Kingdom: Animalia
- Phylum: Arthropoda
- Class: Insecta
- Order: Coleoptera
- Suborder: Polyphaga
- Family: Dermestidae
- Genus: Anthrenus
- Subgenus: Nathrenus
- Species: A. bulirschi

Binomial name
- Anthrenus bulirschi Háva, 2000

Species of beetle

Anthrenus (Nathrenus) bulirschi is a species of carpet beetle found in Greece, Turkey, Israel, Jordan, Lebanon, and Syria.
