= Anthrenus albomaculatus =

Scientific classification
- Kingdom: Animalia
- Phylum: Arthropoda
- Class: Insecta
- Order: Coleoptera
- Suborder: Polyphaga
- Family: Dermestidae
- Genus: Anthrenus
- Subgenus: Nathrenus
- Species: A. albomaculatus

Binomial name
- Anthrenus albomaculatus Pic, 1927

Species of beetle

Anthrenus (Nathrenus) albomaculatus is a species of carpet beetle found in Indonesia (Borneo, Kalimantan) and Malaysia (Pahang, Perak).
