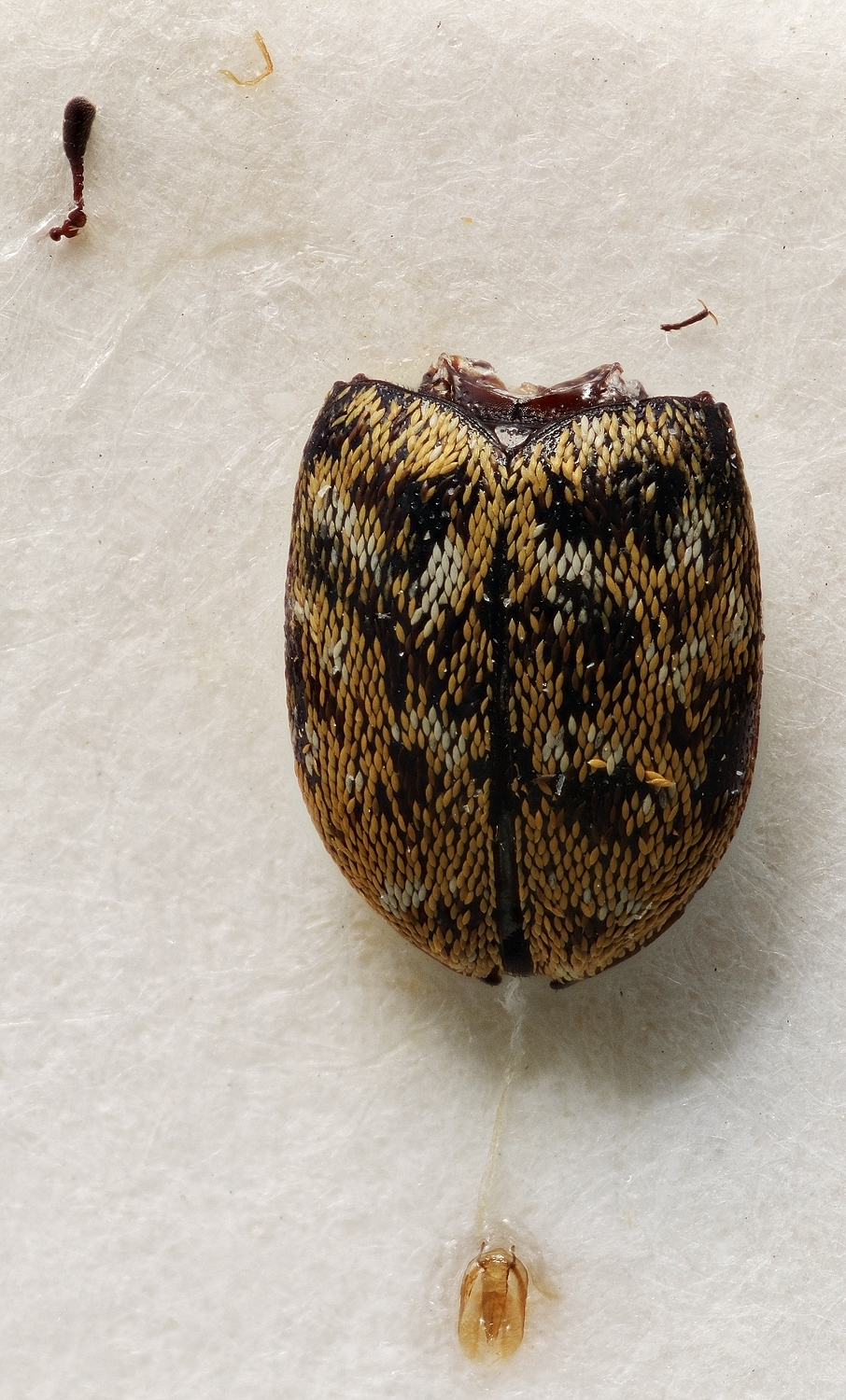
- Male
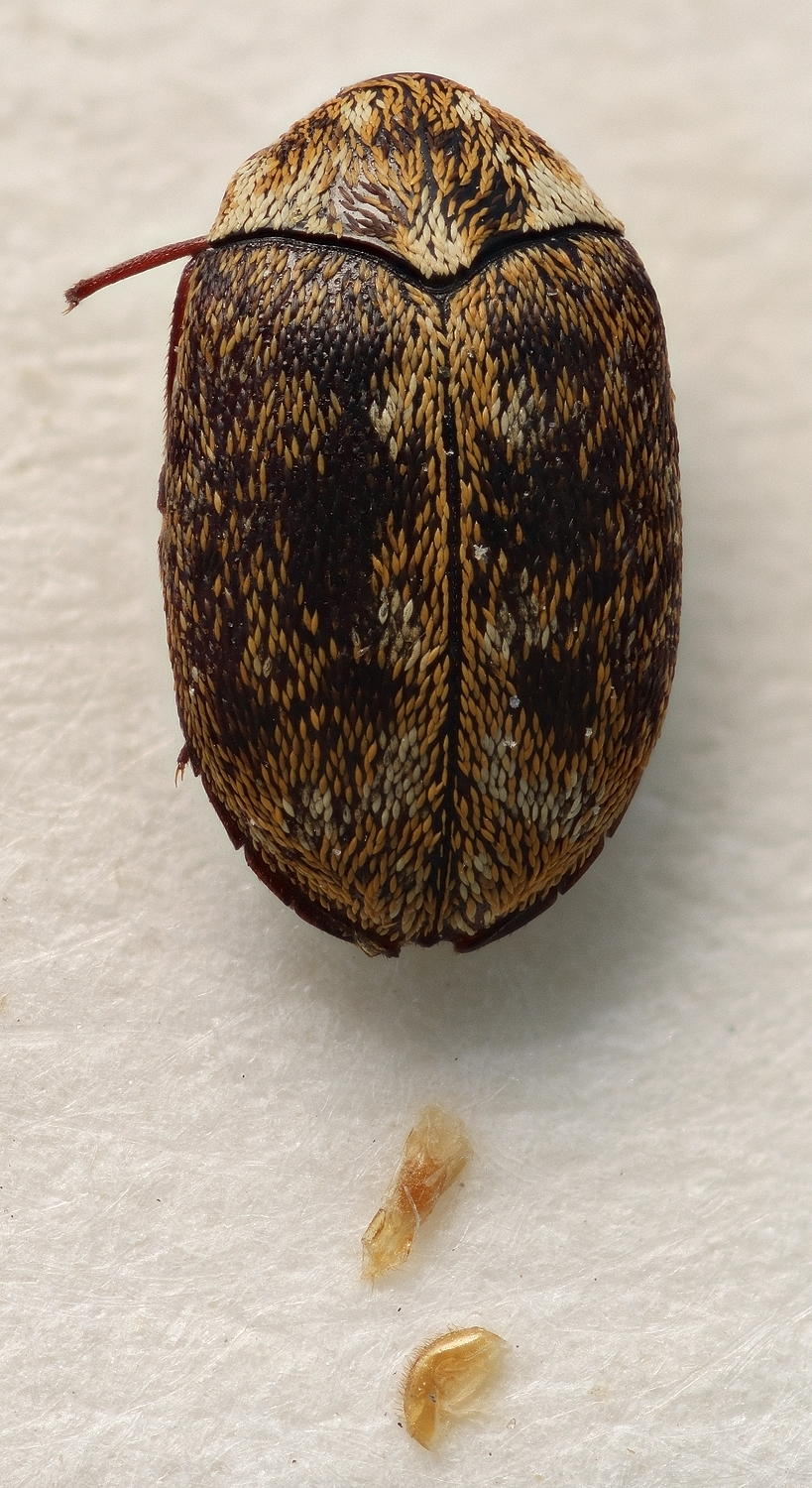
- Female

Scientific classification
- Kingdom: Animalia
- Phylum: Arthropoda
- Class: Insecta
- Order: Coleoptera
- Suborder: Polyphaga
- Family: Dermestidae
- Genus: Anthrenus
- Subgenus: Nathrenus
- Species: A. pubifer

Binomial name
- Anthrenus pubifer Reitter, 1899

Synonyms
- Anthrenus pubifer var. akbesianus Reitter, 1899; Anthrenus assyrius Zhantiev, 2006

= Anthrenus pubifer =

Species of beetle

Anthrenus (Nathrenus) pubifer is a species of carpet beetle found in Turkey, Iran, Iraq, and Syria.
