= Ranthenus =

Scientific classification
- Domain: Eukaryota
- Kingdom: Animalia
- Phylum: Arthropoda
- Class: Insecta
- Order: Coleoptera
- Suborder: Polyphaga
- Family: Dermestidae
- Genus: Anthrenus
- Subgenus: Ranthenus; Mroczkowski, 1962

Species
- See text.

Subgenus of beetles

Ranthenus is a subgenus of the genus Anthrenus of the subfamily Megatominae within the family of skin beetles. Species of subgenus are present only in Asia and Turkey. Subgenus is distinguished by antennae with 4 segments.

== Species ==
According to World Dermestidae catalogue, these species currently belong to subgenus Ranthenus:

- Anthrenus alatauensis (Mroczkowski, 1962) – Kazakhstan; Kyrgyzstan
- Anthrenus kryzhanovskii (Sokolov, 1979) – Kyrgyzstan; Turkmenistan
- Anthrenus prudeki (Háva, 2002) – Turkey; Iran; Syria
- Anthrenus zeravshanicus (Sokolov, 1979) – Tajikistan
