= Anthrenus prudeki =

Scientific classification
- Kingdom: Animalia
- Phylum: Arthropoda
- Class: Insecta
- Order: Coleoptera
- Suborder: Polyphaga
- Family: Dermestidae
- Genus: Anthrenus
- Subgenus: Ranthenus
- Species: A. prudeki

Binomial name
- Anthrenus prudeki Háva, 2002

Species of beetle

Anthrenus prudeki is a species of carpet beetle in the family Dermestidae. It is known from Turkey, Iran, and Syria.
