= Anthrenus bezdeki =

Scientific classification
- Kingdom: Animalia
- Phylum: Arthropoda
- Class: Insecta
- Order: Coleoptera
- Suborder: Polyphaga
- Family: Dermestidae
- Genus: Anthrenus
- Subgenus: Nathrenus
- Species: A. bezdeki

Binomial name
- Anthrenus bezdeki Háva, 2017

Species of beetle

Anthrenus (Nathrenus) bezdeki is a species of carpet beetle found on the island of Socotra, Yemen.
