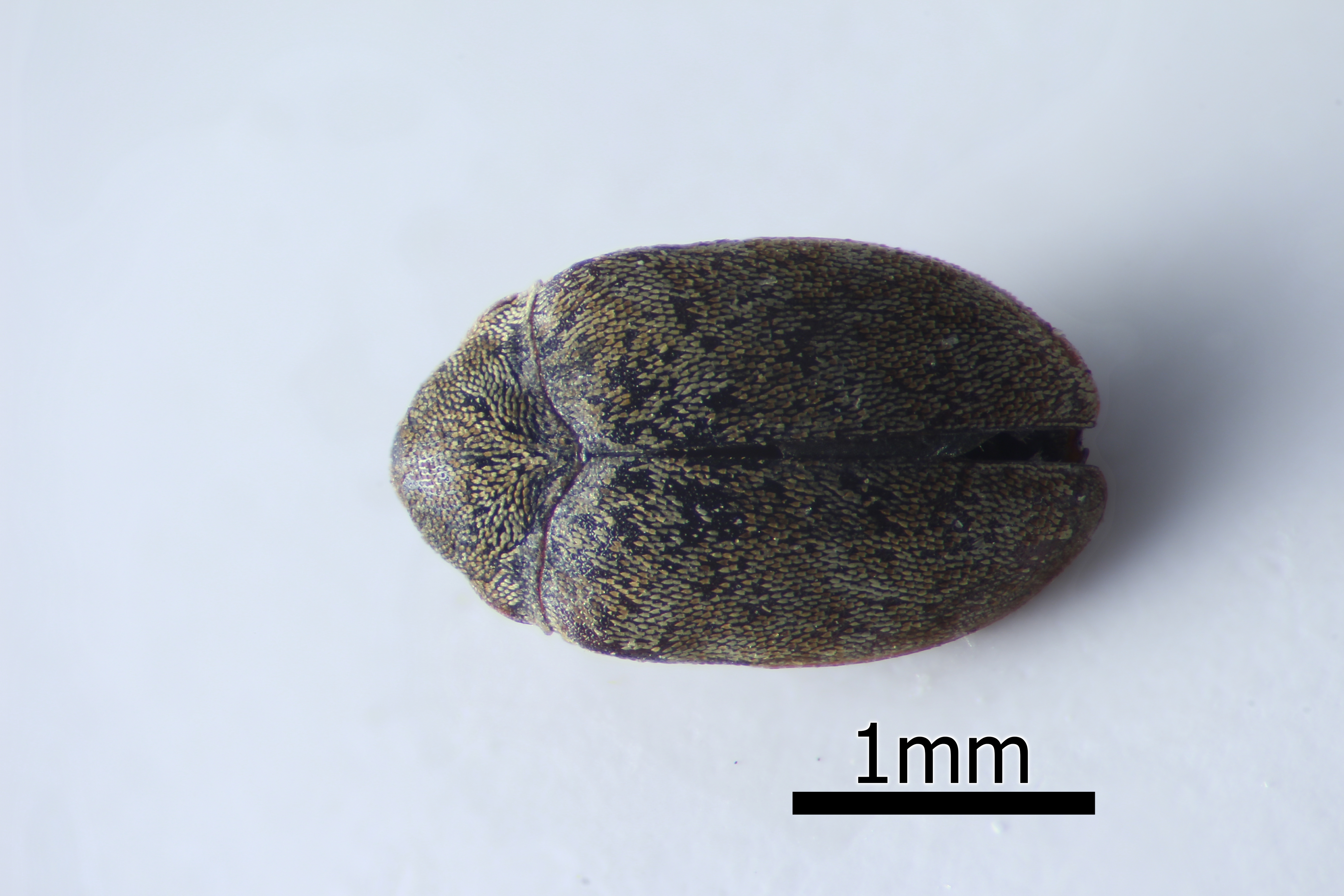

Scientific classification
- Kingdom: Animalia
- Phylum: Arthropoda
- Class: Insecta
- Order: Coleoptera
- Suborder: Polyphaga
- Family: Dermestidae
- Genus: Anthrenus
- Subgenus: Nathrenus
- Species: A. knizeki

Binomial name
- Anthrenus knizeki Háva, 2004

= Anthrenus knizeki =

Species of beetle

Anthrenus knizeki is a species of carpet beetle in the family Dermestidae. It is known from China (Gansu, Hebei, Shaanxi, Sichuan).
