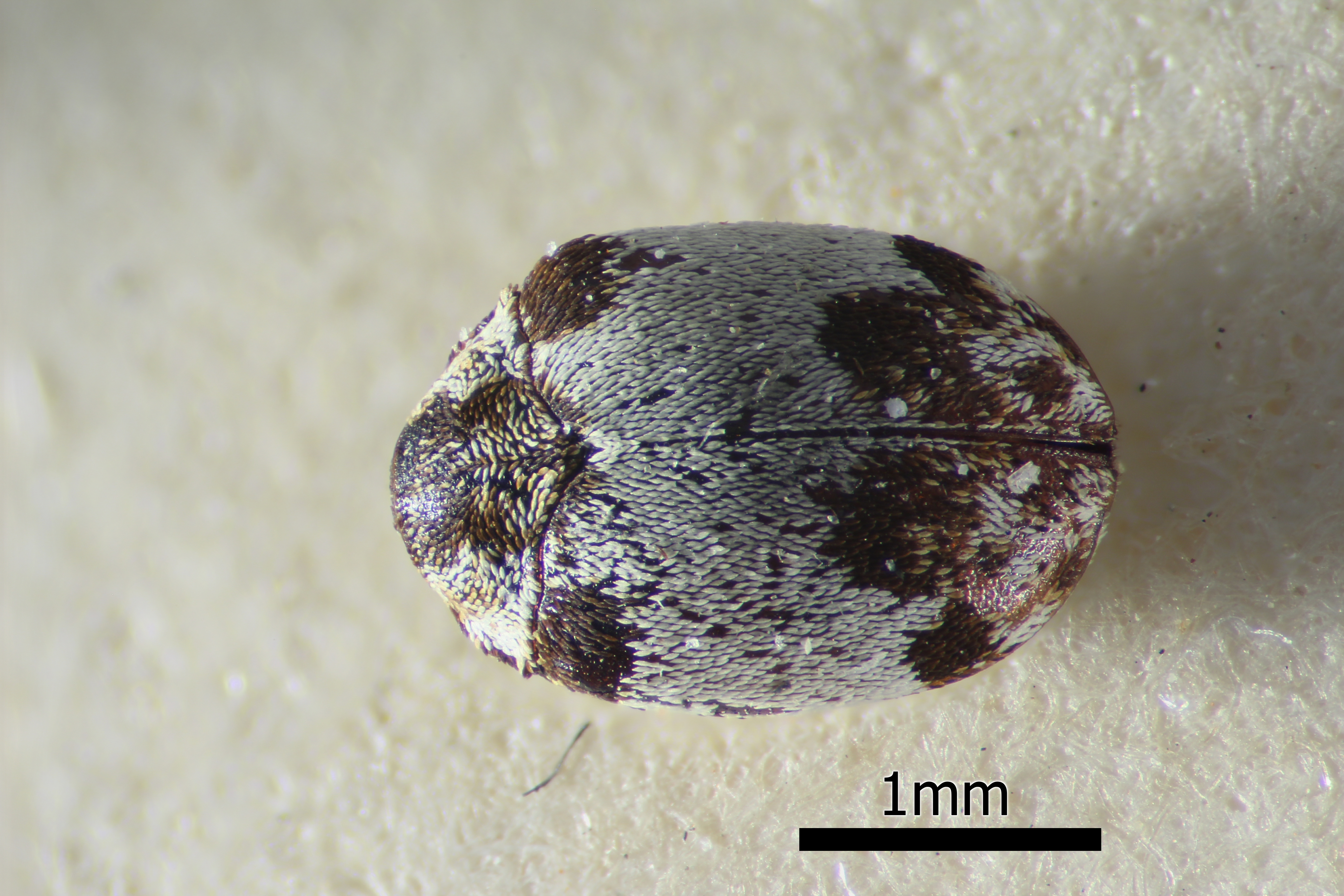

Scientific classification
- Kingdom: Animalia
- Phylum: Arthropoda
- Clade: Pancrustacea
- Class: Insecta
- Order: Coleoptera
- Suborder: Polyphaga
- Family: Dermestidae
- Genus: Anthrenus
- Subgenus: Nathrenus
- Species: A. afer

Binomial name
- Anthrenus afer Péringuey, 1886

= Anthrenus afer =

Species of beetle

Anthrenus afer is a species of carpet beetle in the family Dermestidae. The species is only known from South Africa.

== Taxonomy ==
The species was described by Louis Péringuey in 1886. It is classified in the subfamily Megatominae, tribe Anthrenini, and the verbasci species group within the subgenus Nathrenus.

Its subgeneric placement has varied in the literature. Jiří Háva's catalogue lists its treatment as Anthrenus (Nathrenus) afer by Mroczkowski in 1968, as Anthrenus (Anthrenus) afer by Háva in 2003, and again as Anthrenus (Nathrenus) afer by Háva and Herrmann in 2009.

== Distribution ==
The species is recorded from South Africa. In 2015, Jiří Háva, Andreas Herrmann and Marcin Kadej reported a specimen collected east of Goodhouse, in the Northern Cape, on 15 September 2013 at an elevation of 770 m (2,530 ft).

The specimen was collected by R. Borovec and identified by Jiří Háva. The authors recorded its deposition in Háva's private entomological collection in Únětice, near Prague, Czech Republic. They presented the finding as an additional locality record within the species' previously known South African distribution.
