= Anthrenus molitor =

Scientific classification
- Kingdom: Animalia
- Phylum: Arthropoda
- Class: Insecta
- Order: Coleoptera
- Suborder: Polyphaga
- Family: Dermestidae
- Genus: Anthrenus
- Subgenus: Nathrenus
- Species: A. molitor

Binomial name
- Anthrenus molitor Aubé, 1850

Species of beetle

Anthrenus (Nathrenus) molitor is a species of carpet beetle found across various countries including Albania, Bulgaria, Croatia, France, Greece, Italy, Macedonia, Spain, Turkey, Algeria, Egypt, Morocco, Tunisia, Iraq, Israel, and Lebanon.
