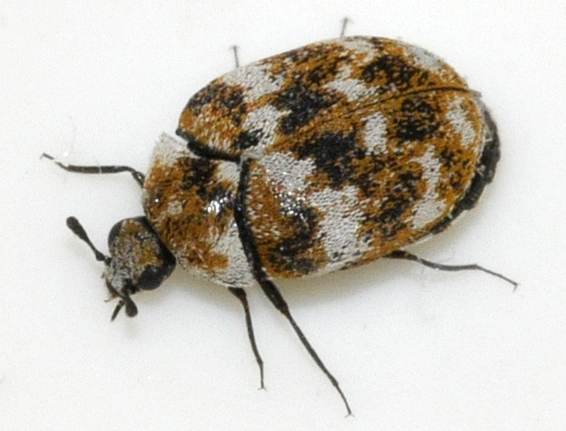
- Anthrenus verbasci, common species from the subgenus (cosmopolitan)

Scientific classification
- Kingdom: Animalia
- Phylum: Arthropoda
- Class: Insecta
- Order: Coleoptera
- Suborder: Polyphaga
- Family: Dermestidae
- Genus: Anthrenus
- Subgenus: Nathrenus; Casey, 1900

Species
- See text.

= Nathrenus =

Subgenus of beetles

Nathrenus is a subgenus of the genus Anthrenus of the subfamily Megatominae within the family of skin beetles. The most well-known species from the subgenus, varied carpet beetle (Anthrenus verbasci), is distributed in most parts of the world, whereas the vast majority of other species are only present in regions of Africa and Asia.

== Key characters ==
Subgenus is distinguished by antennae with 11 segments. Occasionally, male specimen appear with 10 antennae segments, having one less "filler" segment in the middle. Inner edge of eye doesn't have indentation, as opposed to subgenus Anthrenus.

== Species ==
According to World Dermestidae catalogue, these species currently belong to subgenus Nathrenus:

=== Species group "albomaculatus" ===
- Anthrenus albomaculatus (Pic, 1927) – Indonesia (Borneo, Kalimantan); Malaysia (Pahang, Perak)
- Anthrenus cardamom (Háva, 2001) – South India
- Anthrenus constantini (Háva & Herrmann, 2006) – South Africa
- Anthrenus herrmanni (Kadej & Háva, 2016) – Thailand
- Anthrenus hrdlickai (Háva, 2016) – Philippines (Luzon)
- Anthrenus kalimantanus (Háva, 2004) – Indonesia (Kalimantan)
- Anthrenus mindanaoensis (Háva, 2004) – Philippines
- Anthrenus perak (Háva, 2016) – Indonesia (Kalimantan); Malaysia
- Anthrenus preissi (Háva & Herrmann, 2003) – Indonesia (Kalimantan, Sumatra)
- Anthrenus sabahense (Háva, 2021) – Malaysia (Sabah)
- Anthrenus viktorai (Háva, 2016) – Malaysia

=== Species group "verbasci" ===
- Anthrenus afer (Péringuey, 1886) – South Africa
- Anthrenus albostictus (Reitter, 1881) – South Africa
- Anthrenus arndti (Háva, 2005) – Namibia
- Anthrenus barclayi (Háva, 2019) – Angola
- Anthrenus basilewskyi (Kalík, 1965) – Kenya, Malawi, Tanzania, Zambia
- Anthrenus bezdeki (Háva, 2017) – Yemen (Socotra)
- Anthrenus biskrensis (Reitter, 1887) – Italy (Lampedusa, Lipari, Sicily); Malta; Spain; Algeria; Libya; Morocco; Tunisia
- Anthrenus bomiensis (Háva, 2004) – China (Tibet, Yunnan)
- Anthrenus boyesi (Háva, 2004) – Congo; Malawi; Swaziland; Zimbabwe; South Africa (Cape, Namaqualand, Natal, Transvaal, Zululand);
- Anthrenus bulirschi (Háva, 2000) – Greece; Turkey; Israel; Jordan; Lebanon; Syria
- Anthrenus capensis (Guérin–Méneville, 1835) – South Africa
- Anthrenus cordis (Háva & Kadej, 2006) – South Africa
- Anthrenus cylindricornis (Herrmann & Háva, 2014) – South Africa
- Anthrenus edopetri (Háva, 2004) – Laos; Thailand
- Anthrenus exilis (Mulsant & Rey, 1868) – Algeria; Egypt; Libya; Morocco; Tchad; Tunisia
- Anthrenus funebris (Reitter, 1889) – Greece (Karpathos Islands)
- Anthrenus gorki (Háva, 2008) – Azerbaijan; Greece; Turkey
- Anthrenus havai (Kadej & Jakubska, 2007) – Namibia
- Anthrenus jakli (Háva, 2001) – Oman; Yemen
- Anthrenus kabakovi (Kadej & Háva, 2016) – Vietnam
- Anthrenus knizeki (Háva, 2004) – China (Gansu, Hebei, Shaanxi, Sichuan)
- Anthrenus kopeckyi (Háva, 2017) – Morocco
- Anthrenus kucerai (Háva, 2005) – China (Sichuan)
- Anthrenus liliputianus (Mulsant & Rey, 1868) – Egypt
- Anthrenus longisetosus (Kadej & Háva, 2015) – China (Jiangxi, Yunnan, Zhejiang)
- Anthrenus malawicus (Háva, 2004) – Malawi
- Anthrenus maltzi (Kadej, 2010) – Angola
- Anthrenus margarethae (Háva & Kadej, 2006) – South Africa
- Anthrenus molitor (Aubé, 1850) – Albania; Bulgaria; Croatia; France; Greece; Italy; Macedonia; Spain; Turkey; Algeria; Egypt; Morocco; Tunisia; Iraq; Israel; Lebanon
- Anthrenus nadeini (Kadej & Háva, 2008) – Ethiopia
- Anthrenus narani (Háva & Ahmed, 2014) – Pakistan
- Anthrenus natalensis (Háva, 2004) – South Africa (Cape, Natal)
- Anthrenus nideki (Háva, 2005) – South Africa
- Anthrenus nocivus (Mulsant & Godart, 1870) – Algeria
- Anthrenus noctua (Háva, 2005) – South Africa
- Anthrenus obenbergeri (Háva & Herrmann, 2021) – Crete
- Anthrenus obscurus (Thunberg, 1815) – South Africa
- Anthrenus paramolitor (Herrmann & Háva, 2021) – Crete; Turkey
- Anthrenus pilosus (Pic, 1923) – China (Tibet)
- Anthrenus propinquus (Háva, 2005) – China (Sichuan)
- Anthrenus pubifer (Reitter, 1899) – Turkey; Iran; Iraq; Syria
- Anthrenus purcharti (Háva, 2014) – Yemen (Socotra)
- Anthrenus schawalleri (Háva & Kadej, 2006) – China (Sichuan)
- Anthrenus sichuanicus (Háva, 2004) – China (Sichuan)
- Anthrenus signatus (Erichson, 1846) – Austria; Bosnia & Herzegovina; Bulgaria; Croatia; Czech Republic; Greece; Hungary; Italy; Montenegro; Poland; Romania; Serbia; Slovakia; Slovenia; Spain; Turkey
- Anthrenus snizeki (Háva, 2004) – South Africa
- Anthrenus stelma (Kadej & Háva, 2006) – Namibia
- Anthrenus strakai (Herrmann & Háva, 2012) – Cape Verde
- Anthrenus subsetosus (Arrow, 1915) – Myanmar; Vietnam
- Anthrenus transcaspicus (Mroczkowski, 1960) – Iran; Turkmenistan
- Anthrenus tryznai (Háva, 2001) – China (Tibet)
- Anthrenus turnai (Háva, 2004) – China (Sichuan)
- Anthrenus undatus (Reitter, 1881) – South Africa
- Anthrenus verbasci (Linnaeus, 1767) – Cosmopolitan
- Anthrenus versicolor (Reitter, 1887) – Greece; Italy (Sardinia, Sicily)
- Anthrenus zahradniki (Háva, 2003) – Greece (Chios, Rhodes); Lebanon; Turkey; Cyprus

=== Species group "ambericus" (extinct) ===
Some species of subgenus Nathrenus were preserved in amber and consist of:

- †Anthrenus ambericus (Háva, Prokop & Herrmann, 2006)
- †Anthrenus electron (Háva, Prokop & Kadej, 2006)
- †Anthrenus groehni (Háva, Prokop & Herrmann, 2006)
- †Anthrenus kerneggeri (Háva, Prokop & Herrmann, 2008)

== Synonymization of Neoanthrenus ==
In 2013, researchers reclassified the species of the endemic Australian genus Neoanthrenus, placing them under the subgenus Nathrenus (as a group of species "ocellifer"). However, recent research removes the species from genus Anthrenus due to significant genetic and morphological differences.

Species considered to be part of species group "ocellifer":

- Anthrenus armstrongielus (Kadej & Háva, 2013) – Australia: Sydney
- Anthrenus consobrinus (Háva, 2005) – Australia: Northern Territory, Western Australia
- Anthrenus frater (Arrow, 1915) – Tasmania
- Anthrenus king (Háva, 2002) – Australia (King Island)
- Anthrenus macqueeni (Armstrong, 1949) – Australia (Queensland)
- Anthrenus niveosparsus (Armstrong, 1941) – Australia (New South Wales)
- Anthrenus ocellifer (Blackburn, 1891) – Australia (New South Wales, South Australia, Western Australia)
- Anthrenus parallelus (Armstrong, 1941) – Australia (New South Wales, Queensland, Victoria)
- Anthrenus svatopluki (Kadej & Háva, 2013) – Australia (Western Australia)
