= Anthrenus paramolitor =

Scientific classification
- Kingdom: Animalia
- Phylum: Arthropoda
- Class: Insecta
- Order: Coleoptera
- Suborder: Polyphaga
- Family: Dermestidae
- Genus: Anthrenus
- Subgenus: Nathrenus
- Species: A. paramolitor

Binomial name
- Anthrenus paramolitor Herrmann & Háva, 2021

Species of beetle

Anthrenus (Nathrenus) paramolitor is a species of carpet beetle found in Crete (Greece) and Turkey.
