= Anthrenus perak =

Scientific classification
- Kingdom: Animalia
- Phylum: Arthropoda
- Class: Insecta
- Order: Coleoptera
- Suborder: Polyphaga
- Family: Dermestidae
- Genus: Anthrenus
- Subgenus: Nathrenus
- Species: A. perak

Binomial name
- Anthrenus perak Háva, 2016

Species of beetle

Anthrenus (Nathrenus) perak is a species of carpet beetle found in Indonesia (Kalimantan) and Malaysia.
