= Anthrenus versicolor =

Scientific classification
- Kingdom: Animalia
- Phylum: Arthropoda
- Class: Insecta
- Order: Coleoptera
- Suborder: Polyphaga
- Family: Dermestidae
- Genus: Anthrenus
- Subgenus: Nathrenus
- Species: A. versicolor

Binomial name
- Anthrenus versicolor Reitter, 1887

Species of beetle

Anthrenus (Nathrenus) versicolor is a species of carpet beetle found in Greece and Italy (Sardinia, Sicily).
