= Anthrenus propinquus =

Scientific classification
- Kingdom: Animalia
- Phylum: Arthropoda
- Class: Insecta
- Order: Coleoptera
- Suborder: Polyphaga
- Family: Dermestidae
- Genus: Anthrenus
- Subgenus: Nathrenus
- Species: A. propinquus

Binomial name
- Anthrenus propinquus Háva, 2005

Species of beetle

Anthrenus (Nathrenus) propinquus is a species of carpet beetle found in Sichuan, China.
