= Anthrenus bomiensis =

Scientific classification
- Kingdom: Animalia
- Phylum: Arthropoda
- Class: Insecta
- Order: Coleoptera
- Suborder: Polyphaga
- Family: Dermestidae
- Genus: Anthrenus
- Subgenus: Nathrenus
- Species: A. bomiensis

Binomial name
- Anthrenus bomiensis Háva, 2004

Species of beetle

Anthrenus (Nathrenus) bomiensis is a species of carpet beetle native to China (Tibet and Yunnan).
