= Anthrenus funebris =

Scientific classification
- Kingdom: Animalia
- Phylum: Arthropoda
- Class: Insecta
- Order: Coleoptera
- Suborder: Polyphaga
- Family: Dermestidae
- Genus: Anthrenus
- Subgenus: Nathrenus
- Species: A. funebris

Binomial name
- Anthrenus funebris Reitter, 1889

Species of beetle

Anthrenus (Nathrenus) funebris is a species of carpet beetle found on the Karpathos (Greece).
