= Anthrenus constantini =

Scientific classification
- Kingdom: Animalia
- Phylum: Arthropoda
- Class: Insecta
- Order: Coleoptera
- Suborder: Polyphaga
- Family: Dermestidae
- Genus: Anthrenus
- Subgenus: Nathrenus
- Species: A. constantini

Binomial name
- Anthrenus constantini Háva & Herrmann, 2006

Species of beetle

Anthrenus (Nathrenus) constantini is a species of carpet beetle found in South Africa.
