= Anthrenus basilewskyi =

Scientific classification
- Kingdom: Animalia
- Phylum: Arthropoda
- Class: Insecta
- Order: Coleoptera
- Suborder: Polyphaga
- Family: Dermestidae
- Genus: Anthrenus
- Subgenus: Nathrenus
- Species: A. basilewskyi

Binomial name
- Anthrenus basilewskyi Kalík, 1965

Species of beetle

Anthrenus (Nathrenus) basilewskyi is a species of carpet beetle found in Kenya, Malawi, Tanzania, and Zambia.
