= Anthrenus alatauensis =

Scientific classification
- Kingdom: Animalia
- Phylum: Arthropoda
- Class: Insecta
- Order: Coleoptera
- Suborder: Polyphaga
- Family: Dermestidae
- Genus: Anthrenus
- Subgenus: Ranthenus
- Species: A. alatauensis

Binomial name
- Anthrenus alatauensis Mroczkowski, 1962

Species of beetle

Anthrenus alatauensis is a species of carpet beetle in the family Dermestidae. It is known from Kazakhstan and Kyrgyzstan.
