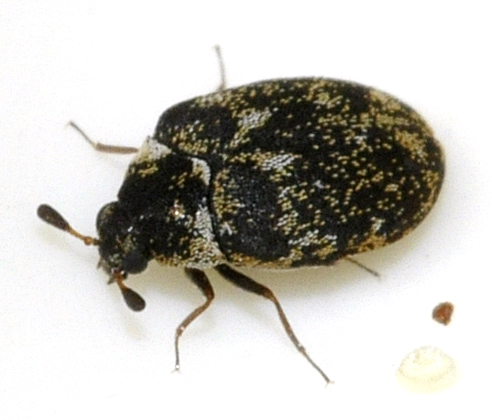
- Male beetle
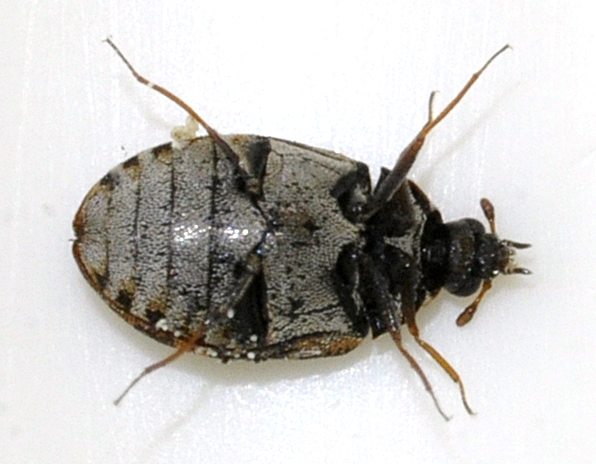
- Female beetle (underside)

Scientific classification
- Kingdom: Animalia
- Phylum: Arthropoda
- Clade: Pancrustacea
- Class: Insecta
- Order: Coleoptera
- Suborder: Polyphaga
- Family: Dermestidae
- Genus: Anthrenus
- Subgenus: Florilinus
- Species: A. museorum

Binomial name
- Anthrenus museorum (Linnaeus, 1761)

= Anthrenus museorum =

Species of beetle

Anthrenus museorum, commonly known as the museum beetle, is a species of beetle found in the Palearctic (including Europe), the Near East and the Nearctic. In its larval form it damages all forms of dry skin and hair. The larva will also eat dry cheese, flour or cocoa occasionally. It is considered a pest, as it damages, among others, the skin of taxidermied animals, such as polar bears and big cats in museums.

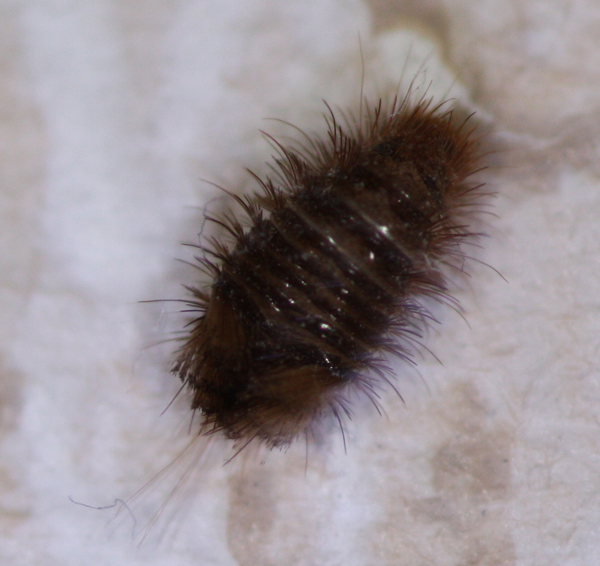
Larva

The larva is yellowish, hairy, and measures 4.5 millimetres (0.18 in). The dorsal surface of the prothorax is brownish. At its rear end, it has three pairs of long antenna. The adult measures 2 to 4 mm. It has a round shape and its dark elytra are spotted with bright colors. It lives for one or two weeks, outdoors, on plants. It prefers the flowers of Asteraceae, Apiaceae and Scrophulariaceae. To lay eggs, the female seeks nooks, carpets, flooring or wool to hide and to assure a food supply for the larvae. She lays forty eggs at a time once a year.

== Range ==
Generally cosmopolitan (appears in Europe, North America, Asia, Africa and Australia). In Europe, it is known from Albania, Austria, Belarus, Belgium, Bosnia and Herzegovina, Bulgaria, Croatia, the Czech Republic, mainland Denmark, Estonia, Finland, mainland France, Germany, Great Britain including the Isle of Man, mainland Greece, Hungary, mainland Italy, Kaliningrad, Latvia, Liechtenstein, Lithuania, Luxembourg, Moldova, North Macedonia, mainland Norway, Poland, mainland Portugal, Romania, Russia, Sardinia, Slovakia, Slovenia, mainland Spain, Sweden, Switzerland, the Netherlands, Ukraine, Turkey, Yugoslavia.

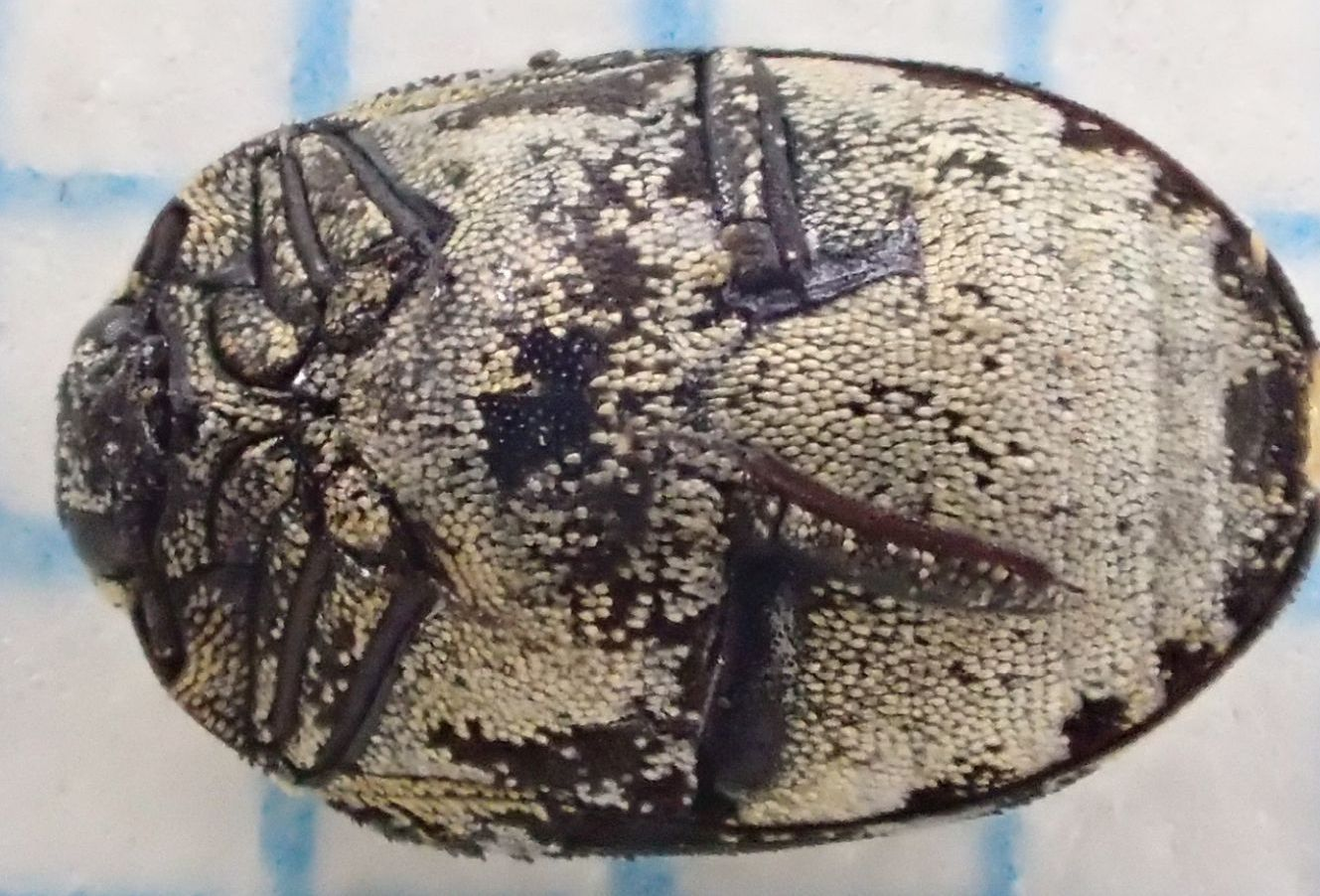
Anthrenus museorum becomes like a round pill when it hides its antennae, head and legs in adapted pits

== See also ==
- Carpet beetle
- Anthrenus fuscus (commonly confused species)
