= A. distinctus =

A. distinctus may refer to:

- Abacetus distinctus, a ground beetle
- Acanthocephaloides distinctus, a parasitic worm
- Afroeurydemus distinctus, a leaf beetle found in the Congo
- Ambonus distinctus, a longhorn beetle
- Anasimyia distinctus, a synonym of Anasimyia distincta, the short-spurred swamp fly, found in North America
- Ancylistes distinctus, a longhorn beetle
- Anthopotamus distinctus, a mayfly found in North America
- Anthrenus distinctus, a carpet beetle found in Afghanistan
- Arion distinctus, a land slug native to Europe
