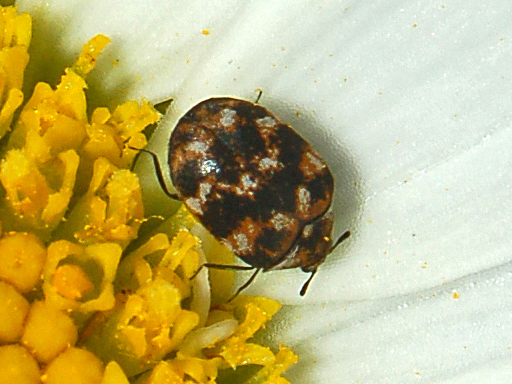
- Dorsal view
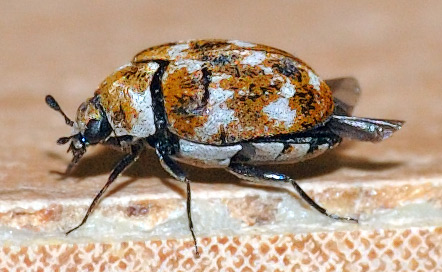
- Side view

Scientific classification
- Kingdom: Animalia
- Phylum: Arthropoda
- Clade: Pancrustacea
- Class: Insecta
- Order: Coleoptera
- Suborder: Polyphaga
- Family: Dermestidae
- Genus: Anthrenus
- Subgenus: Nathrenus
- Species: A. verbasci

Binomial name
- Anthrenus verbasci (Linnaeus, 1767)

Synonyms
- Anthrenus varius Fabricius, 1775; Nathrenus verbasci

= Varied carpet beetle =

Species of beetle

The varied carpet beetle (Anthrenus verbasci) is a 3 mm-long beetle belonging to the family Dermestidae, positioned in subgenus Nathrenus. They are a common species, often considered a pest of domestic houses and, particularly, natural history museums, where the larvae may damage natural fibers and can damage carpets, furniture, clothing, and insect collections. A. verbasci was also the first insect to be shown to have an annual behavioral rhythm and remains a classic example of circannual cycles in animals.

== Description ==
Adult A. verbasci range in length from 1.7 to 3.5 mm (0.07 to 0.14 in). The body is rounded, almost spherical. The elytra and pronotum are covered in fine scales of different colours, creating an irregular pattern of white, brownish and yellowish patches on these features. The white scales are focussed along the lateral margins of the pronotum and on the elytra, where they form three bright, wavy transverse bands. In addition to these morphological features, their antennae are 11-segmented, with a club of 3 segments.

== Distribution and habitat ==
This species is present in most of Europe, in the eastern Palearctic realm, in the Near East, in the Nearctic realm, in North Africa and in North Asia, also in the Neotropics.

Anthrenus verbasci does not have a strict habitat preferences and can be found in many places, but like many species in the genus, it can be found both indoors and outdoors. Its typical habitat is usually open areas with many flowers and trees, but it can also be found in houses, bird nests and other places.

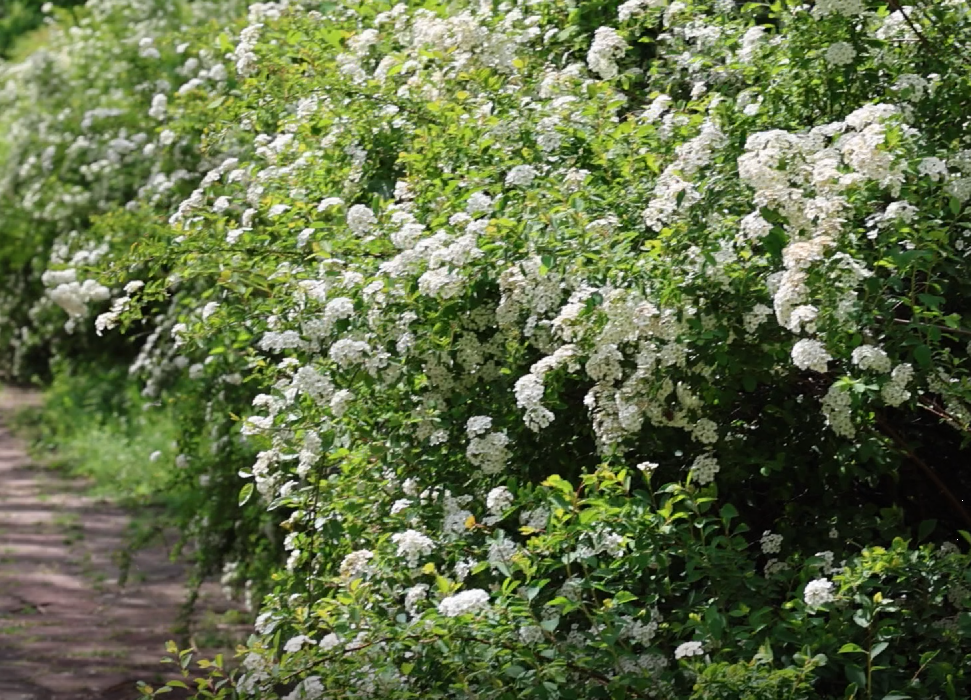
Typical habitat with Spirea flowers for the adults

== Diet and behaviour ==
Larvae feed on keratin and chitin of natural fibers (dead insects, animal hair and feathers) throughout their development, eventually experiencing a dormancy period (also known as diapause) prior to pupation into the adult stage. The length of the dormancy appears to depend on environmental factors, with the most likely zeitgeber, or trigger, being photoperiod. Adults feed on the pollen and nectar of flowering plants. They are reportedly particularly fond of flowers in the daisy family.

== Life cycle ==
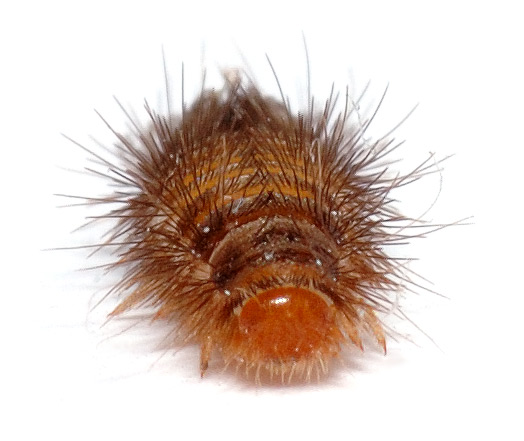
Larva of A. verbasci. Front view

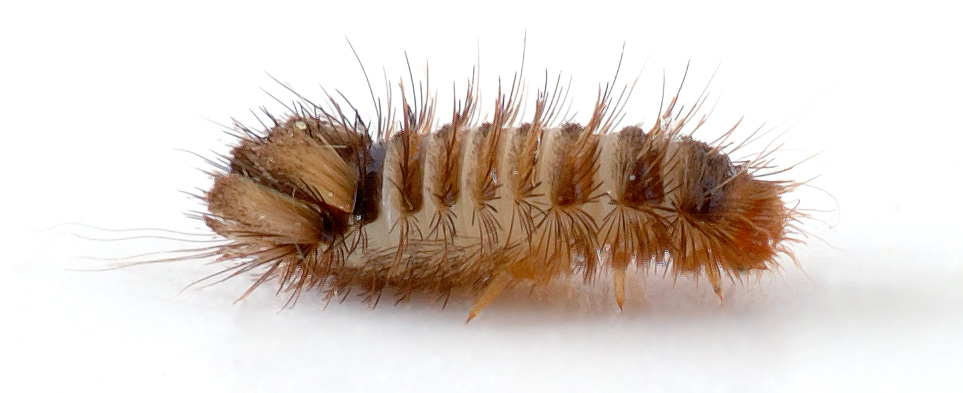
Larval form of Anthrenus verbasci (4.6 mm long)

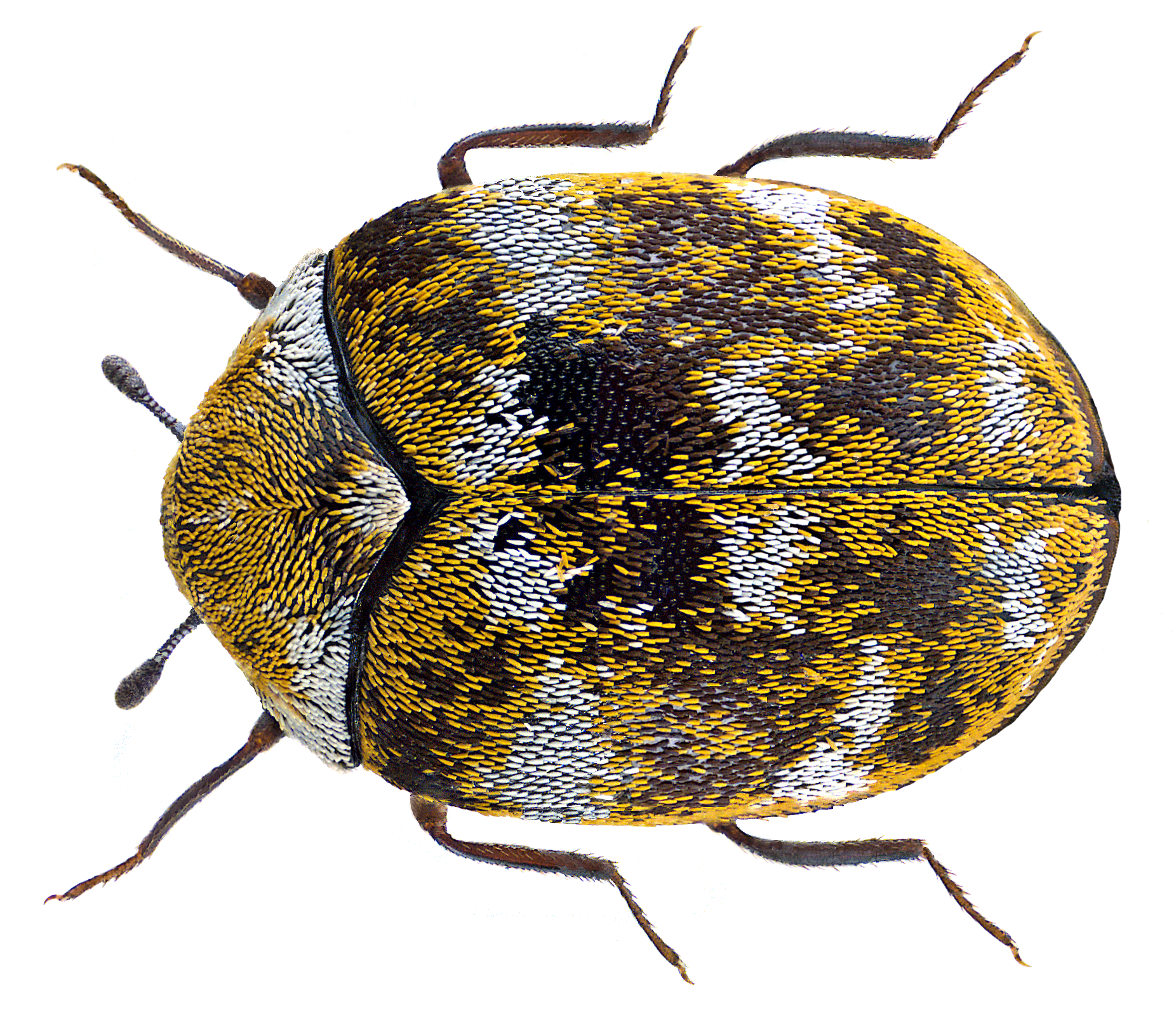
Adult A. verbasci. Dorsal view

A. verbasci has a life cycle ranging from 1–3 years, depending upon the environmental conditions. A study in 1958 found that temperature is able to affect larval development, concluding that the periods of incubation and pupation of A. verbasci decrease with increase of temperature (the life cycle is thus quickened with a moderate rise in temperature). The pupation decreased from 89 days at 10 °C to 9 days at 25 °C. Relative humidity was shown to have little effect.

Larvae hatch from eggs in the spring and early summer, often in the nests of birds (including those of the house sparrow and house swift) or around stored fabrics.

Adults emerge between late May and early August (in England), flying to and feeding on the pollen and nectar of flowering plants. The life expectancy of the beetle is about two weeks. During this period, mating occurs and the eggs are laid, either close to the human environs or in bird nests, tree hollows and similar, dry places where larvae can find their food.

=== Mating ===
This species lives in colonies. They can often be swept off leaves or flowers as they forage and consume pollen and nectar from these flowers in warm weather. As a mating they are polygynadrous (promiscuous) and mate with many partners. What is known is that mating lasts from 1 to 9 minutes and the adults do not require food or water to reproduce. The phenomenon occurs on flowers or host material. Before mating, females assume the characteristic headstand and release pheromones. When a male is nearby, he rises and during the process of positioning he extends his aedeagus and with slight movements from one side to the other a short courtship is performed. The male changes positions and orients himself in copulation. The mounting is short. After 15-20 days the female lays her eggs.

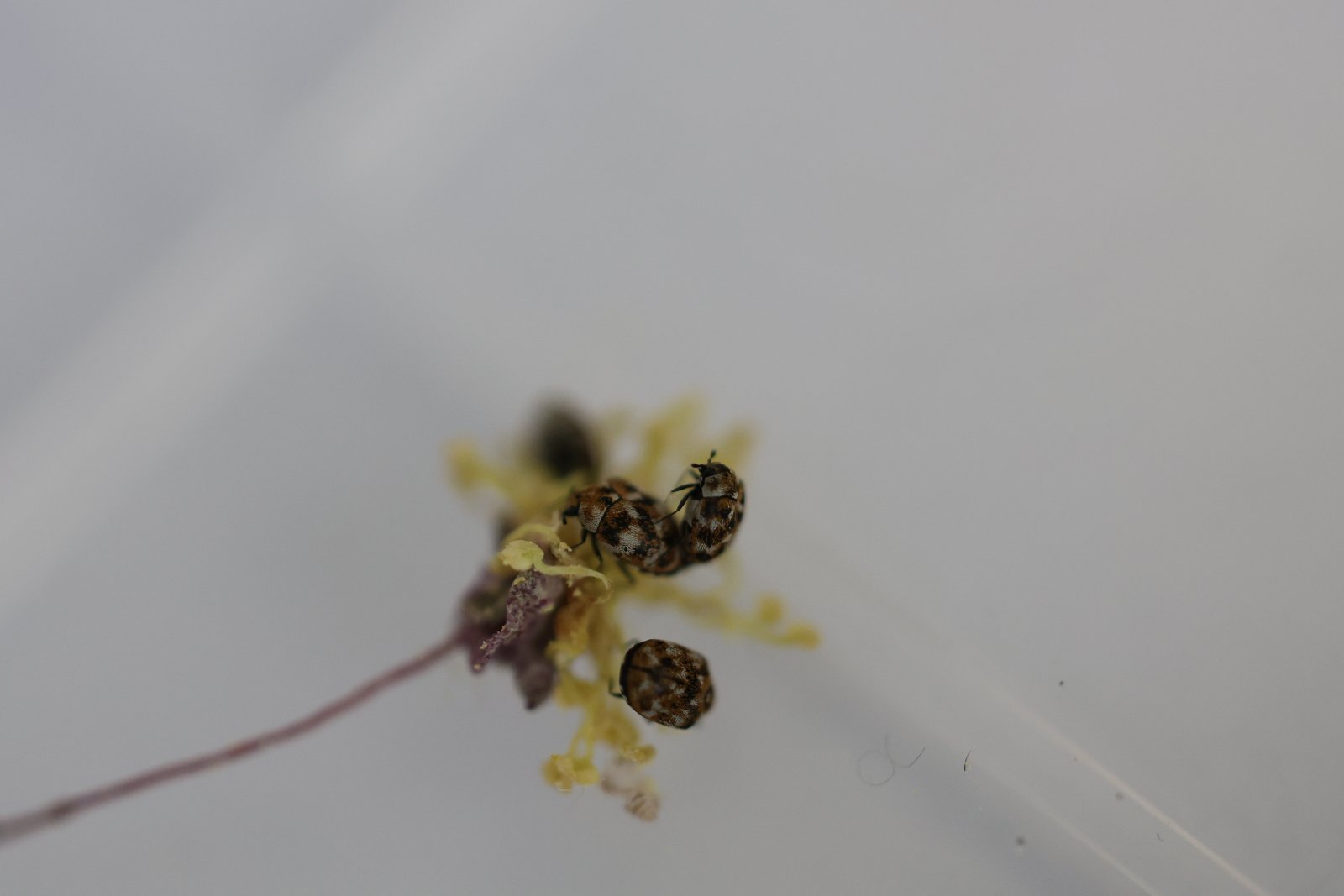
The copulation occurs during the day

=== Egg stage ===
The eggs are laid in dry places, in bird nests in tree hollows where there are dead insects, or in dry dead insects, in dry dead animal parts or plant products, on window sills in houses. The eggs hatch after 15-14 days at 30 °C (86 °F) and up to 28 days at 15 °C (59 °F). They are 0.025 mm in size and white, often stuck together.

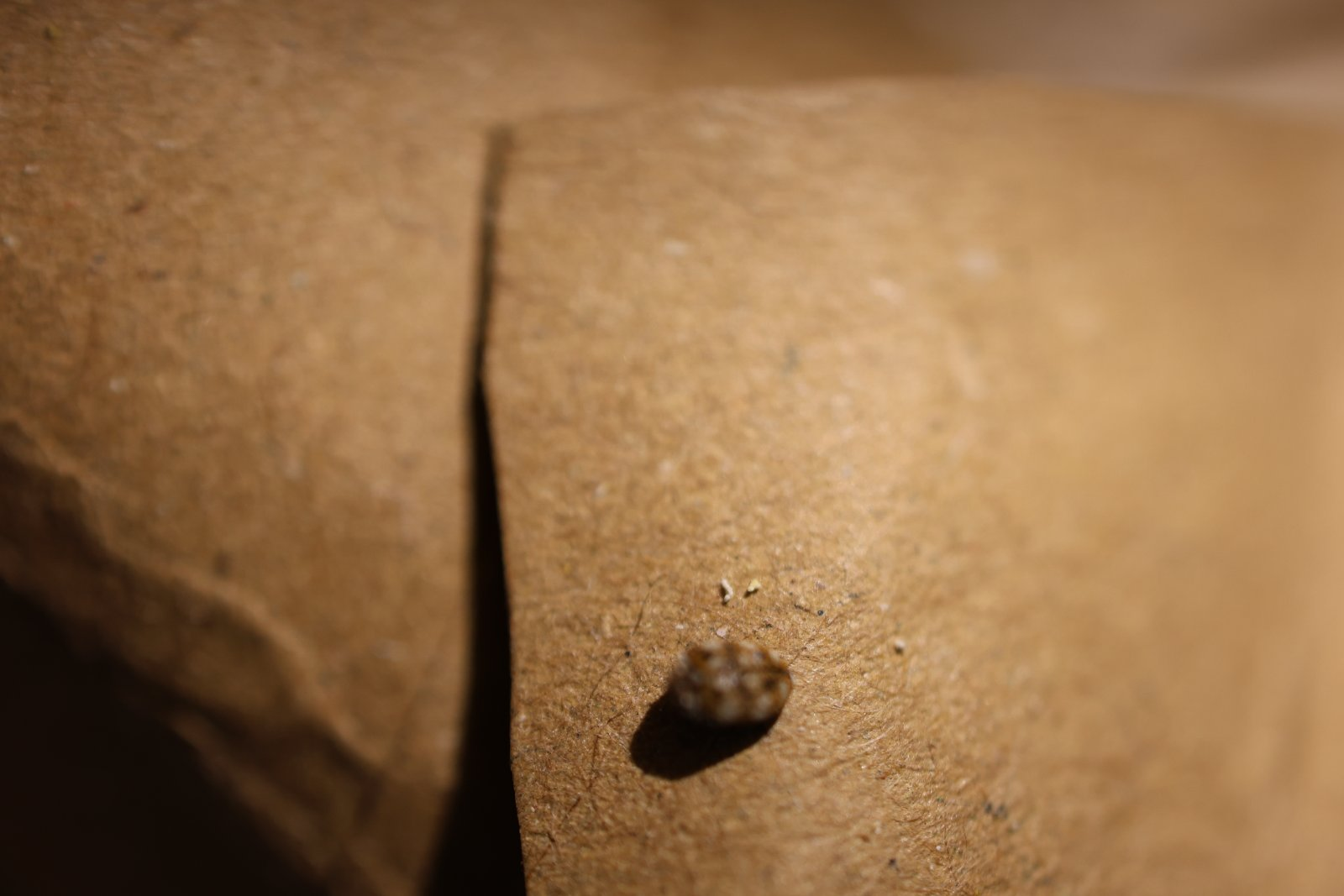
Eggs of the species

=== Larval stage ===
The larval form of A. verbasci, commonly known as 'woolly bears' (a name shared with the larvae of Arctia caja and many other moths of the subfamily Arctiinae), measures up to 4–5 millimetres (0.16–0.20 in) in length. The larvae are elongated and densely covered in large setae (hairs). These hairs are organised into alternating, transverse groups of light and dark-brown patches: the larva appears covered in brown stripes. The body is usually wider at the back than at the front where it also bears 3 pairs of hair tufts along its rear abdomen that can be used for self-defense.

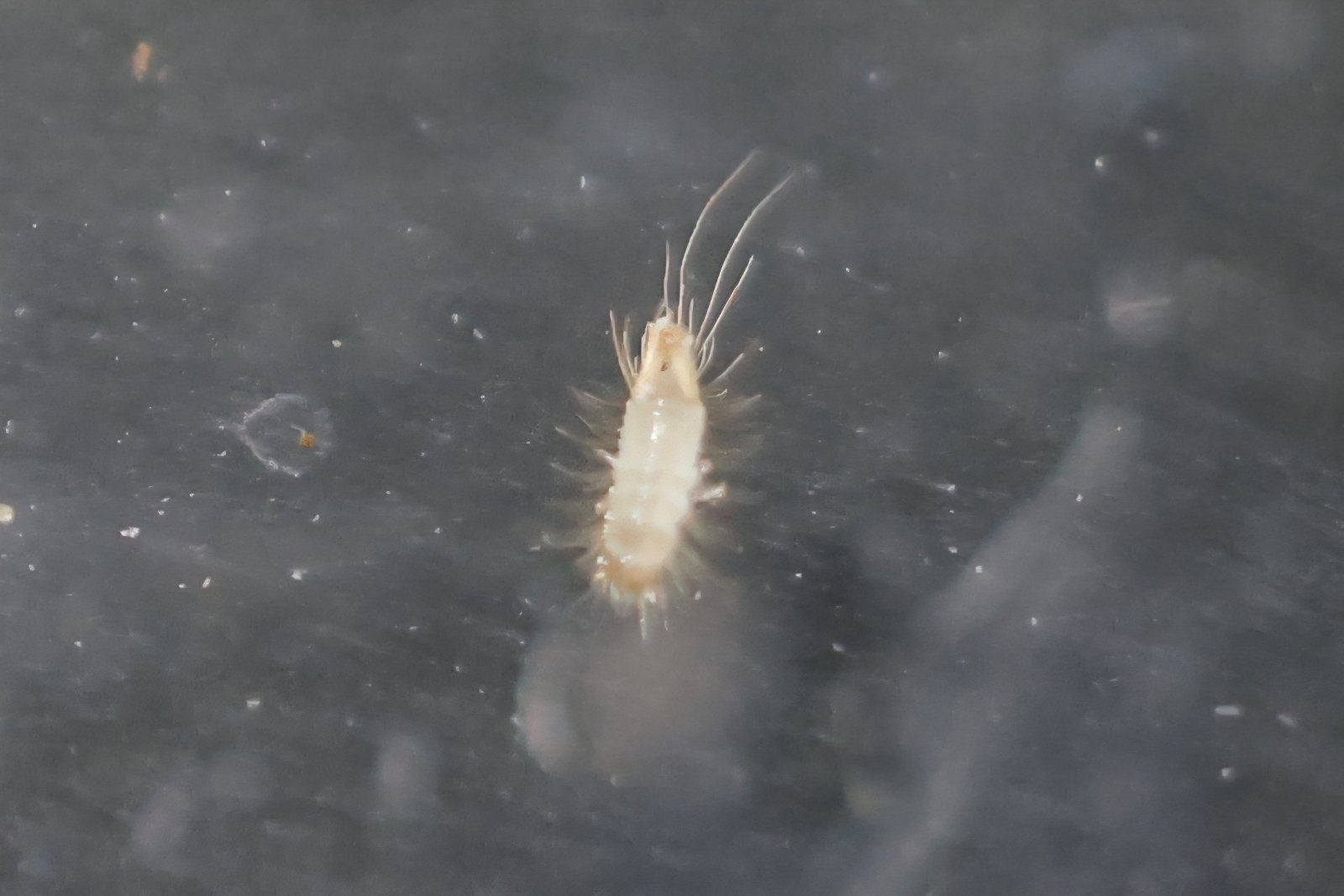
First instar - small and white

The newly-hatched larva is 1 mm long (there are smaller ones). The body is white, somewhat transparent, but after the head the 1st, 2nd and 3rd segments are light brown, and the head is light rusty brown. The last segment is pointed with a small tuft of initially only 5 hairs at the end of the abdomen. They are white and small. The second instar is simply thicker with a wide abdomen slightly after the middle.

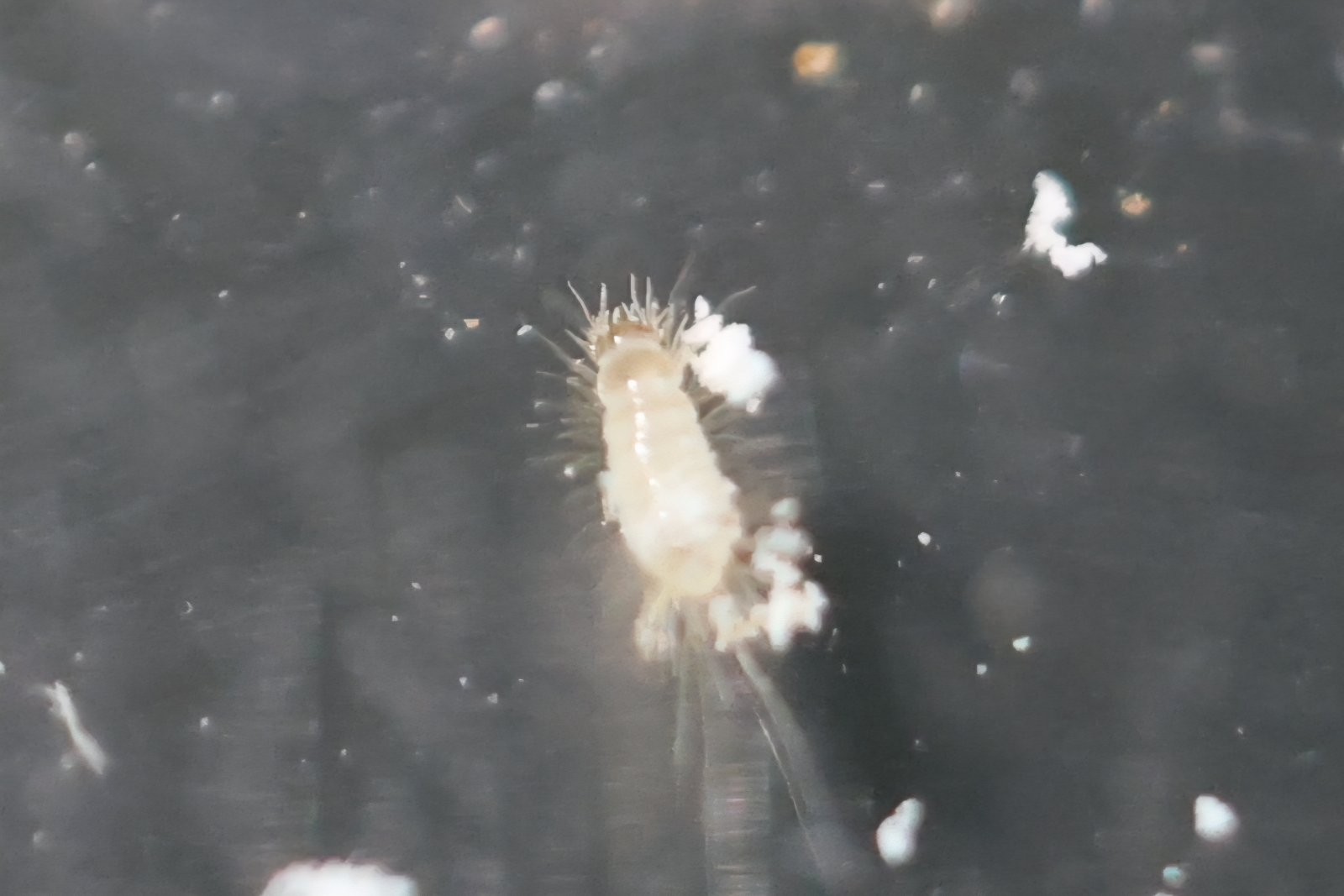
Second instar

The larva in the 3rd instar is already almost with the original colors of the species. Increased number of hairs on the abdominal end in a whole bundle and an orange head. The first three segments are brown.

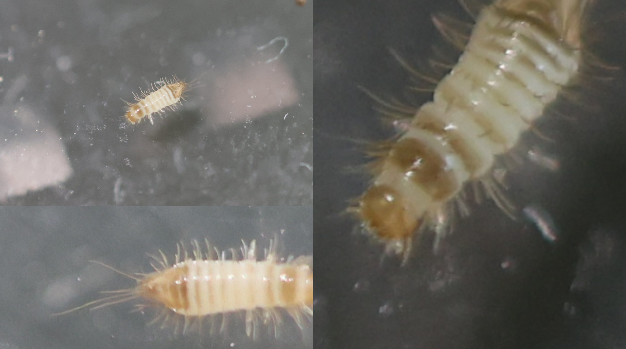
Third instar larva with morphological details

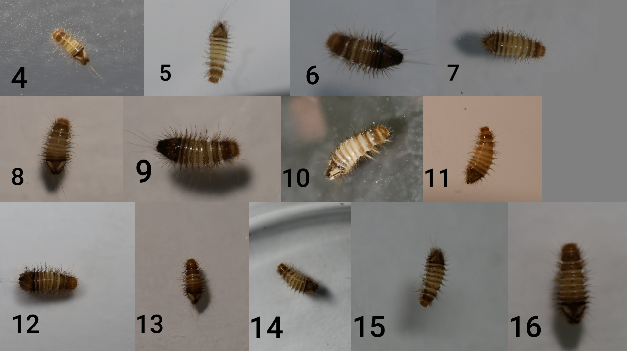
All larval instars of Anthrenus verbasci (4-16)

In the 4th stage, the size becomes 2.5-3 mm, the dark brown 3 segments of the last 4 become more distinct and the hairs change their color to light brown. The tuft of hairs on the last segment is now very clearly visible, and the upper hairs are pale yellowish, darkening towards the end. The head acquires its distinctive orange color for the earlier stages.

In the 5th instar, the length remains 3 mm, which means that the elongation is not particularly significant, unlike in the fourth instar, where the last stripe on the hair bundle is white, in the fifth it is dark. The three brown stripes on the upper part lighten. The head and especially the pronotum acquire a slight orange tint. The hair bundle darkens.

In the 6th instar, the size is already 3.5 mm. The larva has a compact body and has grown a little in width. The head has darkened to dark orange, and the first brown segments have darkened. The tuft of hairs is almost black. This stage is observed 6-7 days after the 5th instar. Most stages last 5 to 7 days in a controlled environment, but this varies depending on temperature and a number of conditions.

Already in the 7th stage they reach 4 mm and are simply a more elongated version of the previous one. There are no new colors. Five or six days after the 6th, this one appears. The 8th is quite stocky and wide. It is still 4 mm. Very dark. The third segment is bleached and blends in with the color of the rest of the body. The body, however, is dark brown. The two white tufts of hair at the back of the body are fading.

In the 9th stage, the 4th and 5th abdominal segments acquire a brown color. The body lightens and acquires a pale yellow color. The hairiness thickens, especially on the pronotum and the head. It, in turn, is already brown. The only thing that makes a difference in the 10th stage is the abdomen, which expends significantly towards the 6th-7th segment. The two white stripes at the end of the abdomen are enlarged and darkened to yellow. In the 11th stage there are not many changes, it is simply longer than the previous one and the coloration of the first segments is more distinct. At these stages, the colors of the larva have already formed and they simply differ in the intensity of the colors. The head looks so small because the abdomen is growing in size.

The 12th instar larva is distinguished by its significantly increased number of hairs. In the 13th stage, the larva is noticeably wider and larger, and its overall darkening is noticeable. It also has a very long hair on its back. In the 14th instar, the penultimate segment has a white stripe that is very clearly visible. The next two segments after the pronotum fade in the middle (a sign of a late stage). The 15th instar is a larger version of the previous one and the 16th is the last with the original larval colors.

== Predators ==
Among the natural predators of A. verbasci, one of the most well-studied is the parasitoid wasp Laelius pedatus (in the family Bethylidae). Upon discovering an A. verbasci larva, a female wasp will land on the larva's dorsal side and attempt to line up its long, stinger-like ovipositor for a paralyzing blow to the thorax. In response, the larva will erect long hairs on their abdomen and attempt to brush these hairs against the encroaching wasp. The hairs detach and stick to the wasp on contact, presumably causing some sort of irritation. Evidently, such irritation is not enough to deter an attack on A. verbasci larvae, as the vast majority of attacks are successful. By comparison, the closely related beetle species Anthrenus flavipes – which has slightly longer hairs than A. verbasci – uses such a defense more effectively.

After a single successful sting, the beetle is permanently paralyzed. The entire process from landing to complete paralysis lasts approximately 40 seconds. L. pedatus does not lay eggs immediately after the beetle is paralyzed, waiting as long as 24 hours before oviposition. During this time, she grooms herself, removing any hairs that might have stuck to her during the attack. During this lengthy process she appears to monitor the larva's state of paralysis by repeatedly biting it and monitoring its reaction. Once sufficiently clear of hairs, the wasp creates a bare patch on the larva's abdomen and lays 2–4 eggs. Eggs hatch in 3–4 days and the larvae feed on the beetle for 3–7 days, eventually killing the host. They then spin cocoons near the empty shell of the host, emerging some time later as adult wasps.

== Interaction with humans ==
=== As a domestic pest ===
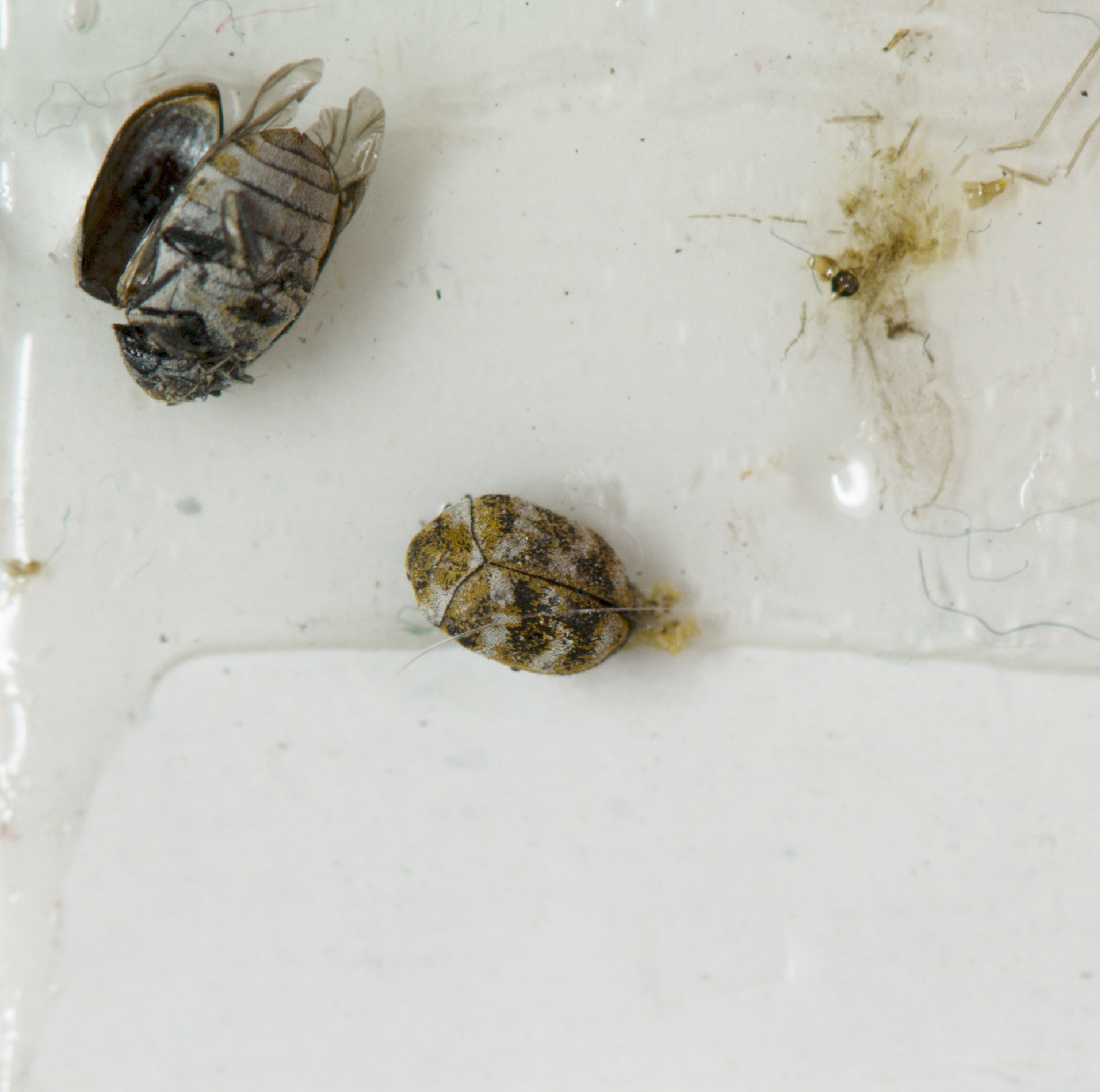
Anthraenus verbasci caught on a sticky blunder trap in a museum.

The larvae of A. verbasci are a common household pest. Adult beetles usually lay their eggs in air ducts, in closets, under furniture, or under baseboards. Once hatched and until they pupate into adults, the larvae hide in dark, undisturbed areas and feed on organic material. The larvae are thus responsible for the damage of various items, such as furniture, clothing, blankets, furs, and carpets. They are commonly found in musical instruments which have been stored for lengthy periods of time, feeding on pads and felts most commonly found in woodwind instruments.

=== As a museum pest ===
Collections of specimens, especially of insects, are also vulnerable to attack, making A. verbasci a common pest in museums. In a 1987 survey of British national history museums, at least five noted that A. verbasci was categorised as a major pest for biological collections. Larvae are often found in the nests of sparrows and wagtails, and so larvae and adults may enter museums at upper levels through windows and roof spaces.

Infestations can be prevented by removing the larvae and adults through regular vacuum cleaning, dry cleaning or airing clothing outside, placing naphthalene balls in closets, and removing abandoned bird and insect nests attached to the building. Signs of an infestation include the presence of damaged articles, moulted larval skins in dark areas, and an abundance of adult beetles near windows. Susceptible people may also find that hairs shed from the larvae cause irritated itchy welts that may be confused with bedbug bites. Deterring or killing A. verbasci can be accomplished using insecticides, oxygen deprivation, freezing, and pheromone and scent traps.
