= Laelius utilis =

Scientific classification
- Kingdom: Animalia
- Phylum: Arthropoda
- Class: Insecta
- Order: Hymenoptera
- Family: Bethylidae
- Genus: Laelius
- Species: L. utilis

Binomial name
- Laelius utilis Cockerell, 1920

Species of insect

Laelius utilis is a hymenopteran parasitoid in the family Bethylidae. It is a gregarious idiobiont larval ectoparasitoid of the larger cabinet beetle, Trogoderma inclusum, a small beetle in the family Dermestidae. It has been reported from the USA (District of Columbia, Maryland, Massachusetts, North Carolina and Virginia) and Canada (Ontario).

Laelius utilis and Laelius centratus look very similar. However, the three central propodeal carinae are complete in L. centratus but only the median carina is complete in L. utilis.
