= Laelius pedatus =

Scientific classification
- Kingdom: Animalia
- Phylum: Arthropoda
- Clade: Pancrustacea
- Class: Insecta
- Order: Hymenoptera
- Family: Bethylidae
- Genus: Laelius
- Species: L. pedatus

Binomial name
- Laelius pedatus (Say, 1836)

Synonyms
- Ateleopterus nubilipennis Ashmead, 1887; Bethylus constrictus Ashmead, 1893; Bethylus pedatus Say, 1836; Laelius ashmeadi Kieffer, 1908; Laelius foersteri Kieffer, 1914; Laelius fumipennis Brues, 1910; Laelius nigripilosus Ashmead, 1893; Laelius rufipes Ashmead, 1893; Laelius tricarinatus Ashmead, 1893; Rhabdepyris areolatus Rosmann & Azevedo, 2005

Species of insect

Laelius pedatus is a hymenopteran parasitoid in the family Bethylidae. It is a gregarious idiobiont larval ectoparasitoid. It is used as a biological control agent against beetle pests in the family Dermestidae.

Known hosts are:

- Anthrenus flavipes LeConte
- Anthrenus sarnicus Mroczkowski
- Anthrenus verbasci L.
- Trogoderma angustum Solier
- Trogoderma glabrum Herbst
- Trogoderma granarium Everts
