= Laelius voracis =

Scientific classification
- Kingdom: Animalia
- Phylum: Arthropoda
- Class: Insecta
- Order: Hymenoptera
- Family: Bethylidae
- Genus: Laelius
- Species: L. voracis

Binomial name
- Laelius voracis Muesebeck, 1939

Species of insect

Laelius voracis is a hymenopteran parasitoid in the family Bethylidae. It is a gregarious idiobiont larval ectoparasitoid of the furniture carpet beetle, Anthrenus flavipes, a small beetle in the family Dermestidae. It has been reported from the USA (Washington, D. C.) and from India.
