= Anthrenus jelineki =

Scientific classification
- Kingdom: Animalia
- Phylum: Arthropoda
- Class: Insecta
- Order: Coleoptera
- Suborder: Polyphaga
- Family: Dermestidae
- Genus: Anthrenus
- Subgenus: Anthrenodes
- Species: A. jelineki

Binomial name
- Anthrenus jelineki Háva, 2009

Species of beetle

Anthrenus (Anthrenodes) jelineki is a species of carpet beetle found in Iran.
