= Anthrenus occultus =

Scientific classification
- Kingdom: Animalia
- Phylum: Arthropoda
- Class: Insecta
- Order: Coleoptera
- Suborder: Polyphaga
- Family: Dermestidae
- Genus: Anthrenus
- Subgenus: Anthrenodes
- Species: A. occultus

Binomial name
- Anthrenus occultus Háva, 2006

Species of beetle

Anthrenus (Anthrenodes) occultus is a species of carpet beetle found in India (Himachal, Kashmir, Uttar Pradesh).
