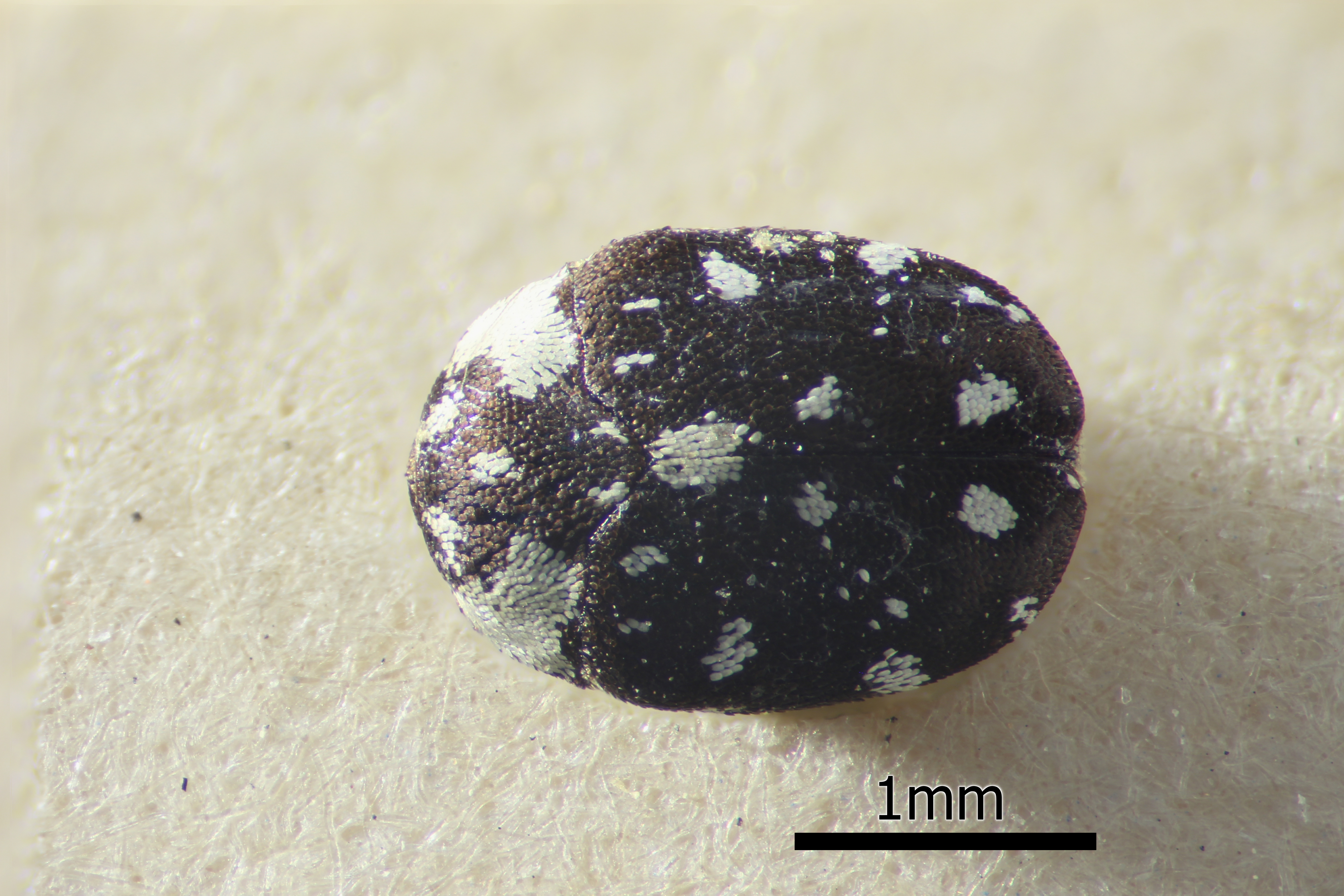

Scientific classification
- Kingdom: Animalia
- Phylum: Arthropoda
- Class: Insecta
- Order: Coleoptera
- Suborder: Polyphaga
- Family: Dermestidae
- Genus: Anthrenus
- Subgenus: Anthrenodes
- Species: A. maculifer

Binomial name
- Anthrenus maculifer Reitter, 1881

= Anthrenus maculifer =

Species of beetle

Anthrenus maculifer is a species of carpet beetle in the family Dermestidae. The species is known from following regions of Asia:

- East Asia: China, Japan, Taiwan
- Southeast Asia: Indonesia, Laos, Malaysia, Myanmar, Philippines, Thailand, Vietnam
- South Asia: India, Nepal
