= Ancylistes transversus =

Scientific classification
- Kingdom: Animalia
- Phylum: Arthropoda
- Clade: Pancrustacea
- Class: Insecta
- Order: Coleoptera
- Suborder: Polyphaga
- Infraorder: Cucujiformia
- Family: Cerambycidae
- Genus: Ancylistes
- Species: A. transversus

Binomial name
- Ancylistes transversus Fairmaire, 1905

Species of beetle

Ancylistes transversus is a species of beetle in the family Cerambycidae. It was described by Fairmaire in 1905.
