= Ancylistes bicuspis =

Scientific classification
- Kingdom: Animalia
- Phylum: Arthropoda
- Clade: Pancrustacea
- Class: Insecta
- Order: Coleoptera
- Suborder: Polyphaga
- Infraorder: Cucujiformia
- Family: Cerambycidae
- Genus: Ancylistes
- Species: A. bicuspis

Binomial name
- Ancylistes bicuspis (Chevrolat, 1857)

Species of beetle

Ancylistes bicuspis is a species of beetle in the family Cerambycidae. It was described by Louis Alexandre Auguste Chevrolat in 1857.
