= Ancylistes obscuricollis =

Scientific classification
- Kingdom: Animalia
- Phylum: Arthropoda
- Clade: Pancrustacea
- Class: Insecta
- Order: Coleoptera
- Suborder: Polyphaga
- Infraorder: Cucujiformia
- Family: Cerambycidae
- Genus: Ancylistes
- Species: A. obscuricollis

Binomial name
- Ancylistes obscuricollis (Fairmaire, 1902)

Species of beetle

Ancylistes obscuricollis is a species of beetle in the family Cerambycidae. It was described by Fairmaire in 1902.
