= Ambonus electus =

Scientific classification
- Kingdom: Animalia
- Phylum: Arthropoda
- Clade: Pancrustacea
- Class: Insecta
- Order: Coleoptera
- Suborder: Polyphaga
- Infraorder: Cucujiformia
- Family: Cerambycidae
- Genus: Ambonus
- Species: A. electus

Binomial name
- Ambonus electus (Gahan in Gahan & Arrow, 1903)

Species of beetle

Ambonus electus is a species of beetle in the family Cerambycidae. It was described by Gahan in 1903. It is found in Honduras, Nicaragua, Panama (Coclé), Colombia, Suriname, Venezuela, Brazil (Rondônia, Mato Grosso, Goiás, Mato Grosso do Sul, Rio Grande do Norte, Paraíba, Alagoas, Pernambuco, Bahia, Minas Gerais, Espírito Santo, Rio de Janeiro, São Paulo, Paraná, Santa Catarina), Bolivia (Santa Cruz, Tarija), Paraguay and Argentina (Salta, Jujuy, Santiago del Estero, Córdoba).
