= Anthrenus guineaensis =

Scientific classification
- Kingdom: Animalia
- Phylum: Arthropoda
- Class: Insecta
- Order: Coleoptera
- Suborder: Polyphaga
- Family: Dermestidae
- Genus: Anthrenus
- Subgenus: Anthrenodes
- Species: A. guineaensis

Binomial name
- Anthrenus guineaensis Háva, 2004

Species of beetle

Anthrenus (Anthrenodes) guineaensis is a species of carpet beetle found in Guinea.
