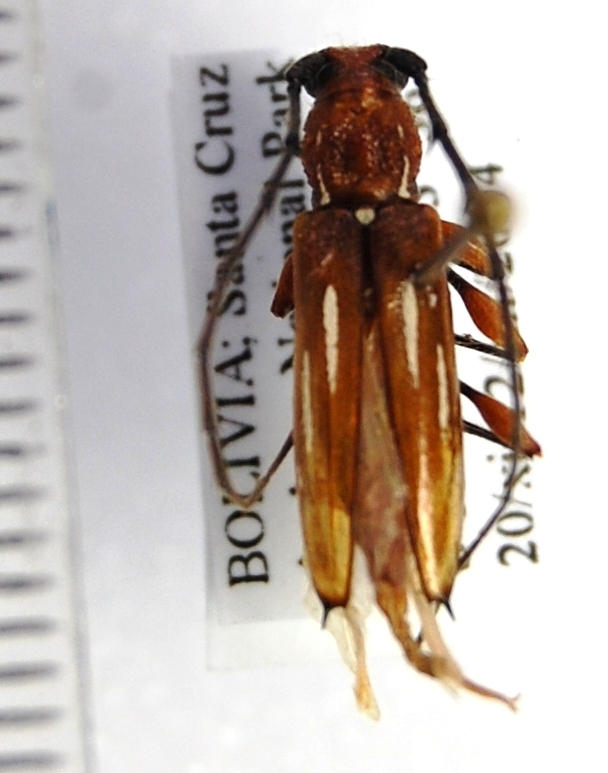

Scientific classification
- Kingdom: Animalia
- Phylum: Arthropoda
- Clade: Pancrustacea
- Class: Insecta
- Order: Coleoptera
- Suborder: Polyphaga
- Infraorder: Cucujiformia
- Family: Cerambycidae
- Genus: Ambonus
- Species: A. lippus

Binomial name
- Ambonus lippus (Germar, 1824)

= Ambonus lippus =

Species of beetle

Ambonus lippus is a species of beetle in the family Cerambycidae. It was described by Ernst Friedrich Germar in 1824. It is found in Brazil (Goiás, Mato Grosso, Distrito Federal, Bahia, Minas Gerais, Espírito Santo, Rio de Janeiro, São Paulo, Paraná, Santa Catarina, Rio Grande do Sul), Bolivia (Santa Cruz), Paraguay and Argentina (Misiones).
