= Ambonus yucatanus =

Scientific classification
- Kingdom: Animalia
- Phylum: Arthropoda
- Class: Insecta
- Order: Coleoptera
- Suborder: Polyphaga
- Infraorder: Cucujiformia
- Family: Cerambycidae
- Genus: Ambonus
- Species: A. yucatanus

Binomial name
- Ambonus yucatanus (E. Fuchs, 1961)

Species of beetle

Ambonus yucatanus is a species of beetle in the family Cerambycidae. It was described by Ernst Fuchs in 1961.
