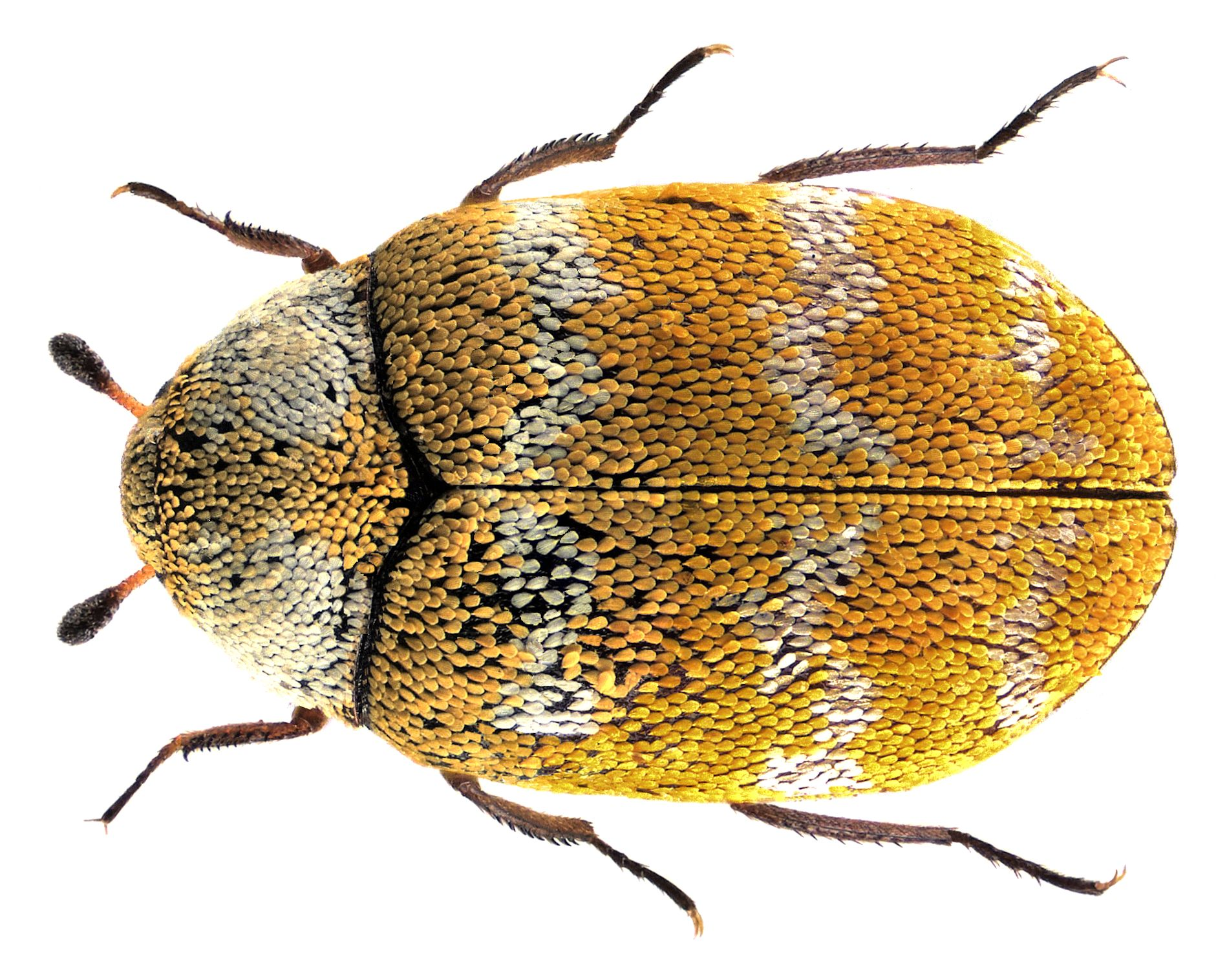

Scientific classification
- Kingdom: Animalia
- Phylum: Arthropoda
- Class: Insecta
- Order: Coleoptera
- Suborder: Polyphaga
- Family: Dermestidae
- Genus: Anthrenus
- Subgenus: Anthrenodes
- Species: A. israelicus

Binomial name
- Anthrenus israelicus Háva, 2004

= Anthrenus israelicus =

Species of beetle

Anthrenus (Anthrenodes) israelicus is a species of carpet beetle found in Algeria, Egypt (Sinai), and Israel.
