= Anthrenus vijaii =

Scientific classification
- Kingdom: Animalia
- Phylum: Arthropoda
- Class: Insecta
- Order: Coleoptera
- Suborder: Polyphaga
- Family: Dermestidae
- Genus: Anthrenus
- Subgenus: Anthrenodes
- Species: A. vijaii

Binomial name
- Anthrenus vijaii Veer, 2011

Species of beetle

Anthrenus (Anthrenodes) vijaii is a species of carpet beetle found in India (Madhya Pradesh and Rajasthan).
