= Anthrenus albonotatus =

Scientific classification
- Kingdom: Animalia
- Phylum: Arthropoda
- Class: Insecta
- Order: Coleoptera
- Suborder: Polyphaga
- Family: Dermestidae
- Genus: Anthrenus
- Subgenus: Anthrenodes
- Species: A. albonotatus

Binomial name
- Anthrenus albonotatus Pic, 1922

Species of beetle

Anthrenus (Anthrenodes) albonotatus is a species of carpet beetle found in India (South) and Vietnam.
