= Ambonus proximus =

Scientific classification
- Kingdom: Animalia
- Phylum: Arthropoda
- Class: Insecta
- Order: Coleoptera
- Suborder: Polyphaga
- Infraorder: Cucujiformia
- Family: Cerambycidae
- Genus: Ambonus
- Species: A. proximus

Binomial name
- Ambonus proximus (Berg, 1889)

Species of beetle

Ambonus proximus is a species of beetle in the family Cerambycidae. It was described by Carlos Berg in 1889.
