= Anthrenus debilis =

Scientific classification
- Kingdom: Animalia
- Phylum: Arthropoda
- Class: Insecta
- Order: Coleoptera
- Suborder: Polyphaga
- Family: Dermestidae
- Genus: Anthrenus
- Subgenus: Anthrenodes
- Species: A. debilis

Binomial name
- Anthrenus debilis Háva, 2005

Species of beetle

Anthrenus (Anthrenodes) debilis is a species of carpet beetle found in China (Sichuan).
