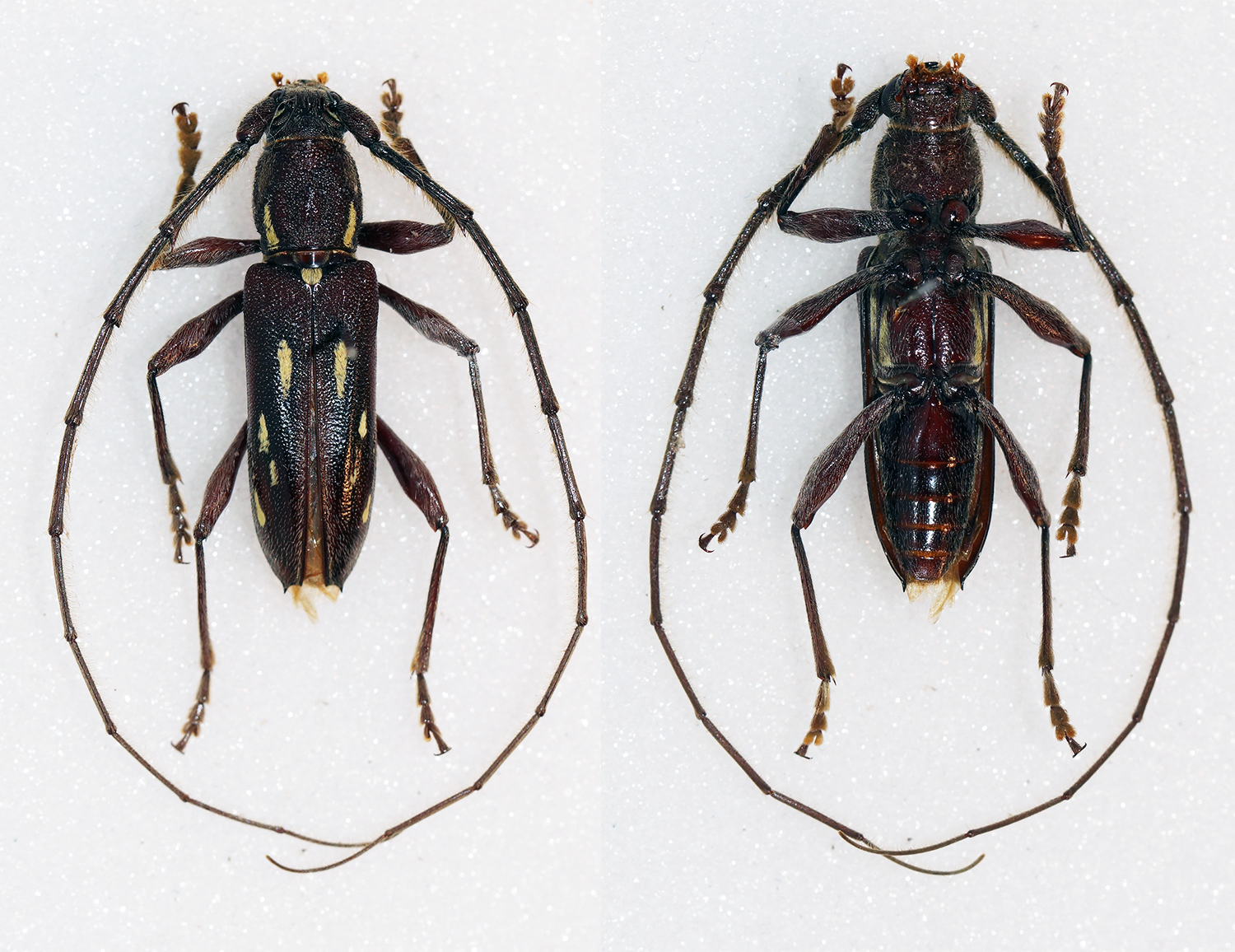
- Ambonus distinctus

Scientific classification
- Kingdom: Animalia
- Phylum: Arthropoda
- Class: Insecta
- Order: Coleoptera
- Suborder: Polyphaga
- Infraorder: Cucujiformia
- Family: Cerambycidae
- Subfamily: Cerambycinae
- Tribe: Elaphidiini
- Genus: Ambonus; Gistel, 1848

= Ambonus =

Genus of beetles

Ambonus is a genus of beetles in the family Cerambycidae, containing the following species:

- Ambonus albomaculatus (Burmeister, 1865)
- Ambonus distinctus (Newman, 1840)
- Ambonus electus (Gahan in Gahan & Arrow, 1903)
- Ambonus interrogationis (Blanchard in Orbigny, 1847)
- Ambonus lippus (Germar, 1824)
- Ambonus proximus (Berg, 1889)
- Ambonus variatus (Newman, 1841)
- Ambonus yucatanus (Fuchs, 1961)
