= Anthrenus amoenulus =

Scientific classification
- Kingdom: Animalia
- Phylum: Arthropoda
- Class: Insecta
- Order: Coleoptera
- Suborder: Polyphaga
- Family: Dermestidae
- Genus: Anthrenus
- Subgenus: Anthrenodes
- Species: A. amoenulus

Binomial name
- Anthrenus amoenulus Reitter, 1896

Species of beetle

Anthrenus (Anthrenodes) amoenulus is a species of carpet beetle found in Caucasus region (Armenia, Azerbaijan, Russia), Afghanistan, Cyprus, Iran, Turkey and Turkmenistan.
