= Ancylistes =

Scientific classification
- Domain: Eukaryota
- Kingdom: Animalia
- Phylum: Arthropoda
- Class: Insecta
- Order: Coleoptera
- Suborder: Polyphaga
- Infraorder: Cucujiformia
- Family: Cerambycidae
- Tribe: Acanthocinini
- Genus: Ancylistes

Genus of beetles

Ancylistes is a genus of beetles in the family Cerambycidae, containing the following species:

subgenus Ancylistes

- Ancylistes bellus Gahan, 1890
- Ancylistes biacutoides Breuning, 1970
- Ancylistes biacutus Breuning, 1957
- Ancylistes bicuspis (Chevrolat, 1857)
- Ancylistes bicuspoides Breuning, 1970
- Ancylistes distinctus Fairmaire, 1901
- Ancylistes gibbicollis Fairmaire, 1897
- Ancylistes impunctatus Fairmaire, 1897
- Ancylistes parabiacutoides Breuning, 1971
- Ancylistes parabiacutus Breuning, 1970
- Ancylistes subtransversus Breuning, 1957
- Ancylistes transversoides Breuning, 1970
- Ancylistes transversus Fairmaire, 1905

subgenus Lactancylistes

- Ancylistes lacteomaculatus Breuning, 1957
- Ancylistes lacteopictus Fairmaire, 1897
- Ancylistes lacteovittatus Breuning, 1957

subgenus Obscurancylistes

- Ancylistes obscuricollis (Fairmaire, 1902)
