= Ancylistes bellus =

Scientific classification
- Kingdom: Animalia
- Phylum: Arthropoda
- Clade: Pancrustacea
- Class: Insecta
- Order: Coleoptera
- Suborder: Polyphaga
- Infraorder: Cucujiformia
- Family: Cerambycidae
- Genus: Ancylistes
- Species: A. bellus

Binomial name
- Ancylistes bellus Gahan, 1890

Species of beetle

Ancylistes bellus is a species of beetle in the family Cerambycidae. It was described by Gahan in 1890.
