= Anthrenus minor =

Scientific classification
- Kingdom: Animalia
- Phylum: Arthropoda
- Class: Insecta
- Order: Coleoptera
- Suborder: Polyphaga
- Family: Dermestidae
- Genus: Anthrenus
- Subgenus: Anthrenodes
- Species: A. minor

Binomial name
- Anthrenus minor Wollaston, 1865

Synonyms
- Anthrenus claviger Wollaston, 1861 (homonym); Anthrenus albidoflavus Reitter, 1881; Anthrenops minutus J. Sahlberg, 1903c (nomen nudum); Anthrenus minor ab. unicolor Uyttenboogaart, 1937; Anthrenus (Nathrenus) canariensis Háva, 2022

Species of beetle

Anthrenus (Anthrenodes) minor is a species of carpet beetle found in the Canary Islands, Greece, Algeria, Egypt, Morocco, Libya, Tunisia, and Saudi Arabia.
