= Anthrenus jordanicus =

Scientific classification
- Kingdom: Animalia
- Phylum: Arthropoda
- Class: Insecta
- Order: Coleoptera
- Suborder: Polyphaga
- Family: Dermestidae
- Genus: Anthrenus
- Subgenus: Anthrenodes
- Species: A. jordanicus

Binomial name
- Anthrenus jordanicus Pic, 1934

Species of beetle

Anthrenus (Anthrenodes) jordanicus is a species of carpet beetle found in Egypt (Sinai), Iran, Israel, Jordan, and Pakistan.
