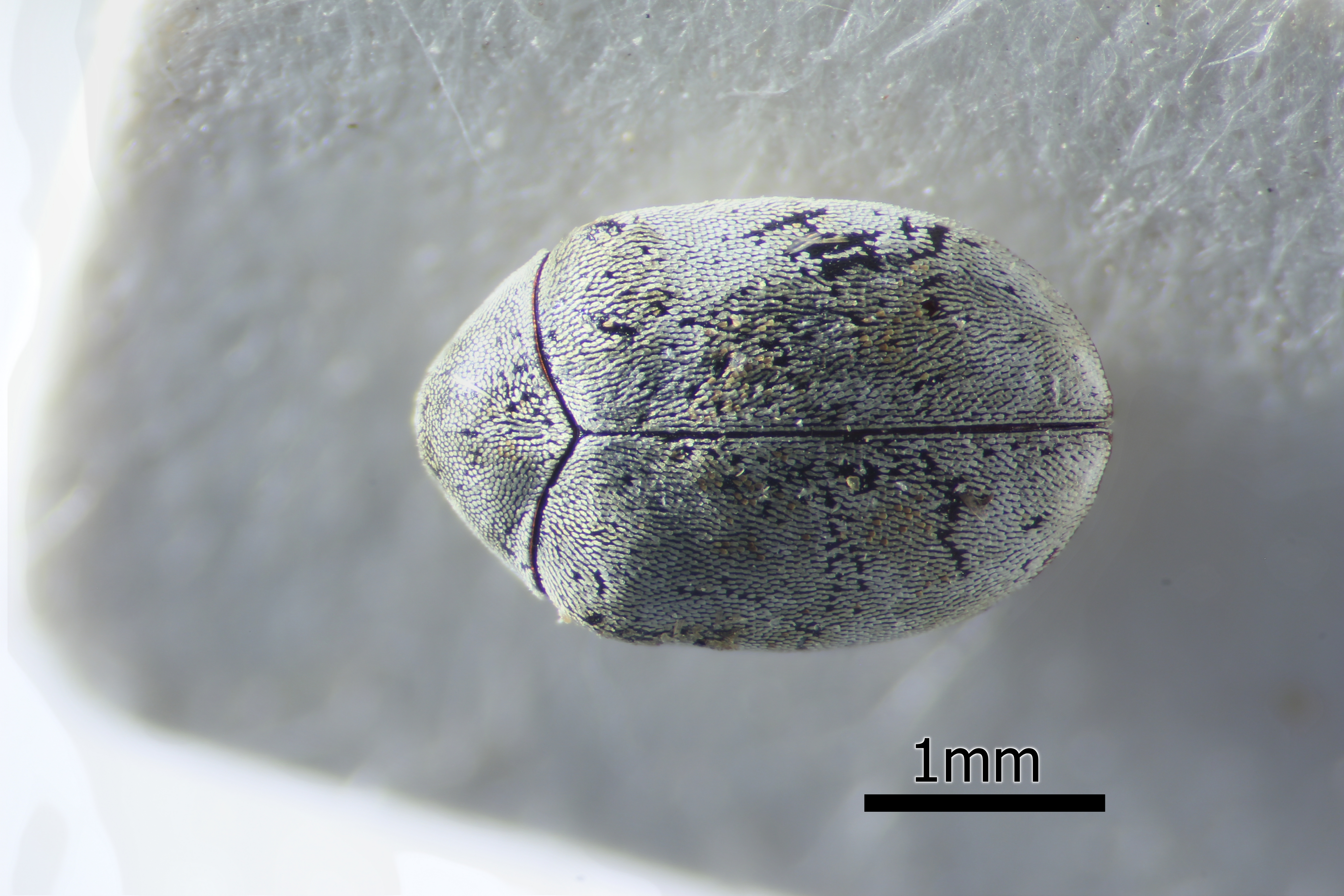

Scientific classification
- Kingdom: Animalia
- Phylum: Arthropoda
- Class: Insecta
- Order: Coleoptera
- Suborder: Polyphaga
- Family: Dermestidae
- Genus: Anthrenus
- Subgenus: Anthrenodes
- Species: A. semenovi

Binomial name
- Anthrenus semenovi Zhantiev, 1976

= Anthrenus semenovi =

Species of beetle

Anthrenus semenovi is a species of carpet beetle in the subgenus Anthrenodes of the genus Anthrenus, family Dermestidae. It is known from India (North), Pakistan, and Tajikistan.
