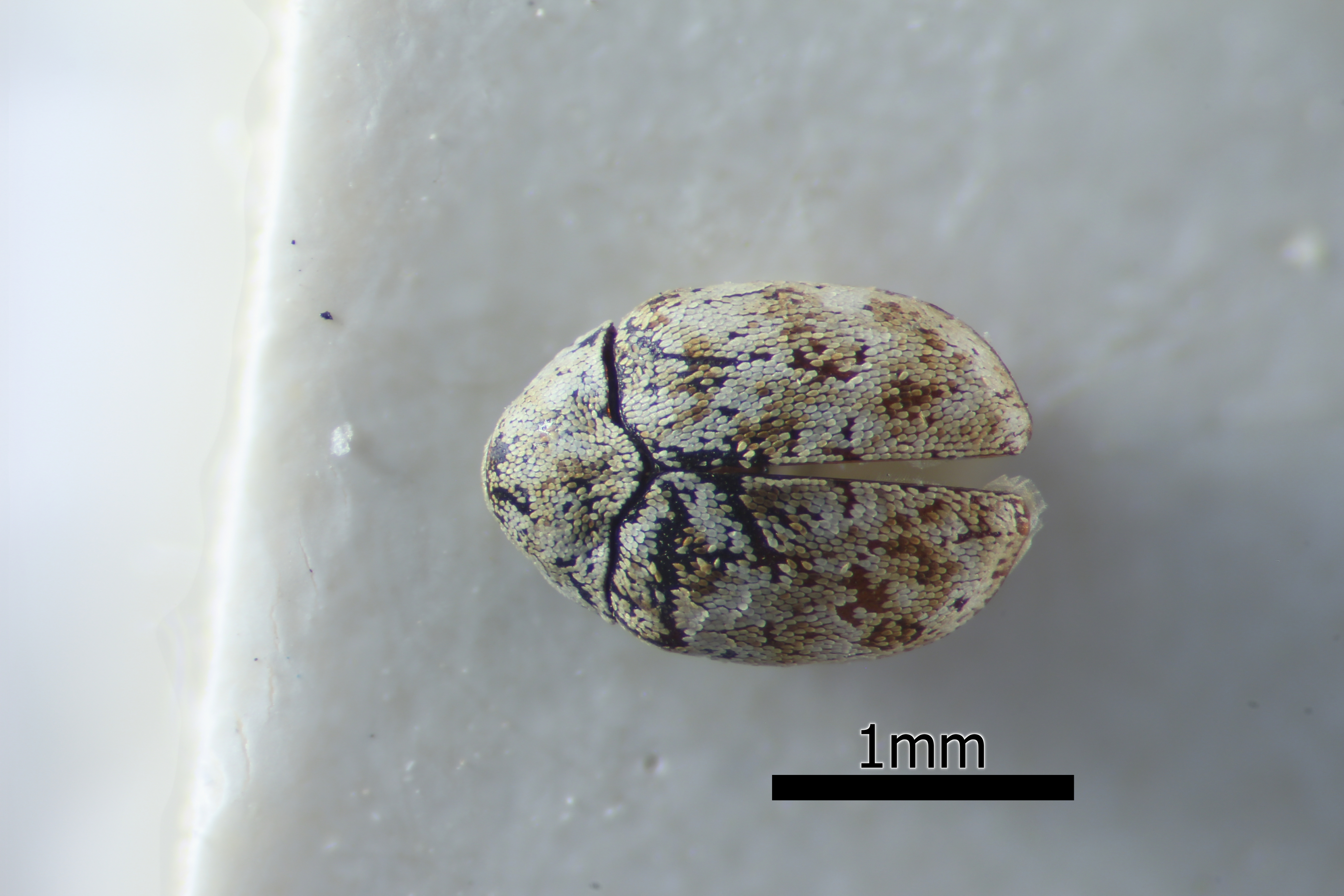

Scientific classification
- Kingdom: Animalia
- Phylum: Arthropoda
- Class: Insecta
- Order: Coleoptera
- Suborder: Polyphaga
- Family: Dermestidae
- Genus: Anthrenus
- Subgenus: Anthrenodes
- Species: A. aegyptiacus

Binomial name
- Anthrenus aegyptiacus Pic, 1899

= Anthrenus aegyptiacus =

Species of beetle

Anthrenus aegyptiacus is a species of carpet beetle in the family Dermestidae. It is known from Algeria and Egypt.
