= Anthrenus ceylonicus =

Scientific classification
- Kingdom: Animalia
- Phylum: Arthropoda
- Class: Insecta
- Order: Coleoptera
- Suborder: Polyphaga
- Family: Dermestidae
- Genus: Anthrenus
- Subgenus: Anthrenodes
- Species: A. ceylonicus

Binomial name
- Anthrenus ceylonicus Kadej & Háva, 2006

Species of beetle

Anthrenus ceylonicus, is a species of skin beetle found in Sri Lanka.

== Description ==
Body length is about 2.15 to 2.7 mm.
