= Anthrenus wittmeri =

Scientific classification
- Kingdom: Animalia
- Phylum: Arthropoda
- Class: Insecta
- Order: Coleoptera
- Suborder: Polyphaga
- Family: Dermestidae
- Genus: Anthrenus
- Subgenus: Anthrenodes
- Species: A. wittmeri

Binomial name
- Anthrenus wittmeri Mroczkowski, 1980

Species of beetle

Anthrenus (Anthrenodes) wittmeri is a species of carpet beetle found in Eritrea, Sudan, and Saudi Arabia.
