= Anthrenus umbellatarum =

Scientific classification
- Kingdom: Animalia
- Phylum: Arthropoda
- Class: Insecta
- Order: Coleoptera
- Suborder: Polyphaga
- Family: Dermestidae
- Genus: Anthrenus
- Subgenus: Anthrenodes
- Species: A. umbellatarum

Binomial name
- Anthrenus umbellatarum Chobaut, 1898

Species of beetle

Anthrenus (Anthrenodes) umbellatarum is a species of carpet beetle found in Algeria, Egypt, Libya, Morocco, and Israel.
