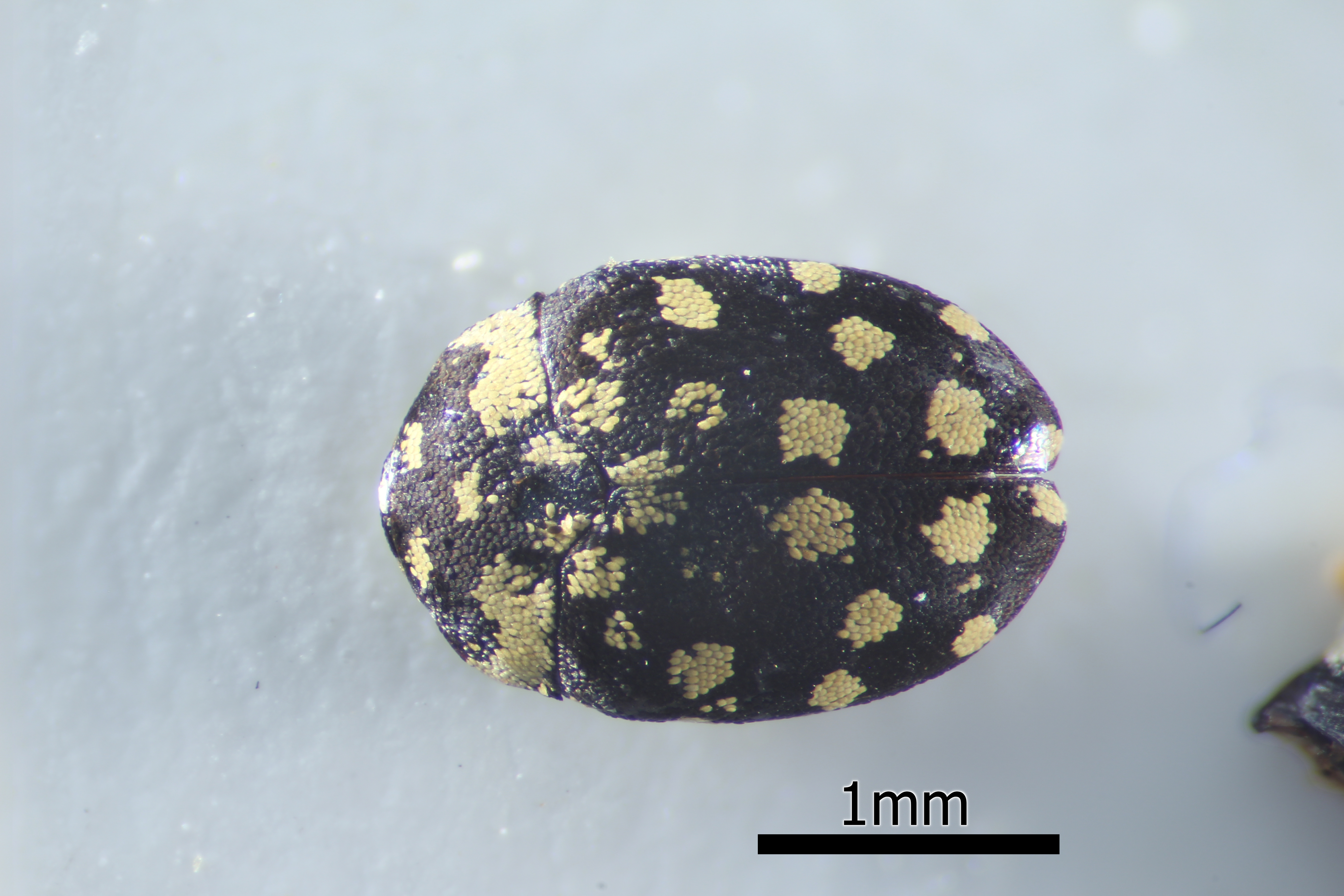

Scientific classification
- Kingdom: Animalia
- Phylum: Arthropoda
- Class: Insecta
- Order: Coleoptera
- Suborder: Polyphaga
- Family: Dermestidae
- Genus: Anthrenus
- Subgenus: Anthrenodes
- Species: A. difficilis

Binomial name
- Anthrenus difficilis Háva, 2005

= Anthrenus difficilis =

Species of beetle

Anthrenus difficilis is a species of carpet beetle in the family Dermestidae. The species is only known from Thailand.
