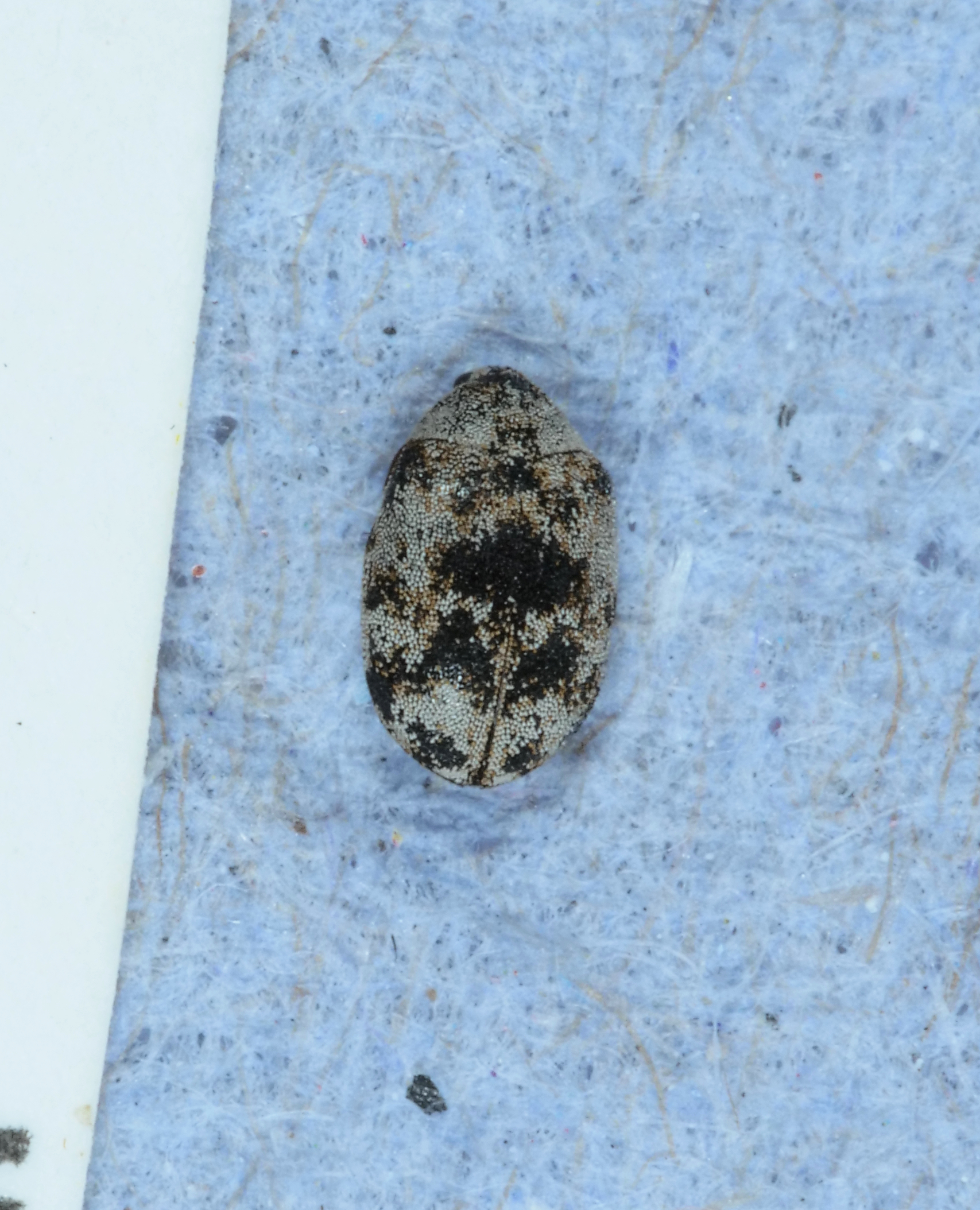
- Anthrenus sarnicus, a beetle from subgenus Anthrenodes known in the United Kingdom and Guernsey

Scientific classification
- Domain: Eukaryota
- Kingdom: Animalia
- Phylum: Arthropoda
- Class: Insecta
- Order: Coleoptera
- Suborder: Polyphaga
- Family: Dermestidae
- Genus: Anthrenus
- Subgenus: Anthrenodes; Chobaut, 1898

Species
- See text.

= Anthrenodes =

Subgenus of beetles

Anthrenodes is a subgenus of the genus Anthrenus of the subfamily Megatominae within the family of skin beetles. Subgenus is distinguished by antennae with 10 segments.

== Species ==
According to World Dermestidae catalogue, these species currently belong to subgenus Anthrenodes:

- Anthrenus aegyptiacus (Pic, 1899) – Algeria; Egypt
- Anthrenus albonotatus (Pic, 1922) – India (South); Vietnam
- Anthrenus amoenulus (Reitter, 1896) – Caucasus region (Armenia, Azerbaijan, Russia); Afghanistan; Cyprus; Iran; Turkey; Turkmenistan
- Anthrenus araraticus (Herrmann & Háva, 2022) – Armenia
- Anthrenus buettikeri (Mroczkowski, 1980) – Saudi Arabia
- Anthrenus ceylonicus (Kadej & Háva, 2006) – Sri Lanka
- Anthrenus debilis (Háva, 2005) – China (Sichuan)
- Anthrenus difficilis (Háva, 2005) – Thailand
- Anthrenus distinctus (Kadej & Háva, 2006) – Afghanistan
- Anthrenus fernandezi (Háva, 2003) – Burkina Faso; Cameroon; Nigeria; Chad
- Anthrenus guineaensis (Háva, 2004) – Guinea
- Anthrenus himalayensis (Háva, Wachkoo & Maqbool, 2019) – India (Kashmir)
- Anthrenus hulai (Háva, 2017) – Yemen
- Anthrenus ineptus (Háva & Tezcan, 2004) – Turkey; Iran; Iraq
- Anthrenus israelicus (Háva, 2004) – Algeria; Egypt (Sinai); Israel
- Anthrenus jelineki (Háva, 2009) – Iran
- Anthrenus jordanicus (Pic, 1934) – Egypt (Sinai); Iran; Israel; Jordan; Pakistan
- Anthrenus katrinkrauseae (Háva, 2018) – India (Kashmir)
- Anthrenus kejvali (Háva, 2000) – India (Nilgiri Hills)
- Anthrenus klapperichi (Kadej & Háva, 2006) – Afghanistan
- Anthrenus maculifer (Reitter, 1881) – China; India; Indonesia; Japan; Laos; Malaysia; Myanmar; Nepal; Philippines; Taiwan; Thailand; Vietnam
- Anthrenus malkini (Mroczkowski, 1980) – Oman; Qatar; Saudi Arabia; United Arab Emirates; Yemen
- Anthrenus minor (Wollaston, 1865) – Canary Islands; Greece; Algeria; Egypt; Morocco; Libya; Tunisia; Saudi Arabia
- Anthrenus occultus (Háva, 2006) – India (Himachal, Kashmir, Uttarpradesh)
- Anthrenus omoi (Beal, 1998) – Mexico (Sonora); United States (Arizona)
- Anthrenus poggii (Háva, 2002) – Ethiopia; Somalia
- Anthrenus pulchellus (Gestro, 1889) – Saudi Arabia; Yemen
- Anthrenus reconditus (Háva, 2023) – India (Tamil Nadu)
- Anthrenus sarnicus (Mroczkowski, 1963) – United Kingdom; Channel Islands (originating in Guernsey). Introduced in Finland and Netherlands
- Anthrenus semenovi (Zhantiev, 1976) – India (North); Pakistan; Tajikistan
- Anthrenus umbellatarum (Chobaut, 1898) – Algeria; Egypt; Libya; Morocco; Israel
- Anthrenus vijaii (Veer, 2011) – India (Madhya Pradesh, Rajasthan)
- Anthrenus wittmeri (Mroczkowski, 1980) – Eritrea; Sudan; Saudi Arabia
