= Laelius (wasp) =

Scientific classification
- Kingdom: Animalia
- Phylum: Arthropoda
- Class: Insecta
- Order: Hymenoptera
- Family: Bethylidae
- Subfamily: Epyrinae
- Genus: Laelius; Ashmead, 1893

Genus of wasps

Laelius is a genus of hymenopteran parasitoids in the family Bethylidae. Laelius species are ectoparasitoids of immature stages of beetles, such as Dermestidae, and thus are commonly taken indoors. There are 57 extant species worldwide, and four additional species known from fossil records in amber. A number of species have recently been moved from the genus Rhabdepyris to Laelius.

Living species and their distribution:

- Laelius agraensis Kurian, 1955 - India
- Laelius akares Barbosa & Azevedo, 2009 - Madagascar
- Laelius anfractuosus Benoit, 1952 - Algeria
- Laelius anthrenivorus Trani, 1909 - France, Italy, Romania
- Laelius antropovi Gorbatovsky, 1955 - Russia
- Laelius arryni Barbosa & Azevedo, 2014 - Brazil
- Laelius baratheoni Barbosa & Azevedo, 2014 - Brazil
- Laelius billi Barbosa & Azevedo, 2014 - Brazil, Mexico, Nicaragua, USA
- Laelius bipartitus Kieff er, 1906 - France
- Laelius borealis Vikberg, 2005 - Finland, Sweden
- Laelius brachistos Barbosa & Azevedo, 2010 - United Arab Emirtates
- Laelius canchinensis (Azevedo, 1992) - Brazil
- Laelius centratus (Say, 1836) - Canada, Mexico, USA
- Laelius elisae Russo, 1938 - Italy
- Laelius femoralis (Förster, 1860) - Finland, Germany, Sweden
- Laelius firmipennis (Cameron, 1905) - South Africa
- Laelius fulvipes Kieffer, 1906 - Israel, Italy, Romania, Spain
- Laelius fumimarginalis Vikberg, 2005 - Sweden
- Laelius glossinae (Turner & Waterston, 1916) - Malawi
- Laelius gracilis (Evans, 1965) - Mexico, USA
- Laelius haplos Barbosa & Azevedo, 2011 - Australia
- Laelius hirticulus (Evans, 1965) - Brazil, Panama
- Laelius huachucae (Evans, 1965) - USA
- Laelius lannisteri Barbosa & Azevedo, 2014 - Brazil
- Laelius maboya (Snelling, 1996) - British Virgin Island
- Laelius martelli Barbosa & Azevedo, 2014 - Brazil
- Laelius mekes Barbosa & Azevedo, 2009 - Madagascar
- Laelius mellipes (Evans, 1965) - USA
- Laelius mesitioides (Duchaussoy, 1916) - Canary Islands
- Laelius microneurus (Kieff er, 1906) - Belgium, France, Japan
- Laelius minutulus (Evans, 1965) - Peru
- Laelius muesebecki (Evans, 1965) - Bolivia, Costa Rica, Ecuador, Honduras, Mexico, USA
- Laelius multilineatus (Evans, 1966) - Ecuador
- Laelius naniwaensis Terayama, 2006 - Japan
- Laelius nigriscapus (Evans, 1965) - Argentina
- Laelius nigrofemoratus Terayama, 2006 - Japan
- Laelius ogmos Barbosa & Azevedo, 2011 - Thailand
- Laelius parcepilosus Vikberg, 2005 - Finland
- Laelius pedatus (Say, 1836) - Brazil, Canada, Germany, Mexico, The Netherlands, UAE, USA
- Laelius perrisi Kieffer, 1906 - France
- Laelius quadrangulus Barbosa & Azevedo, 2011 - Australia
- Laelius ruficrus Kieffer, 1906 - Italy
- Laelius rufipes (Förster, 1860) - France, Germany
- Laelius seticornis (Duchaussoy, 1916) - Canary Islands
- Laelius simplex Evans, 1978 - USA
- Laelius sinicus Xu, He & Terayama, 2003 - China
- Laelius starki Barbosa & Azevedo, 2014 - Brazil
- Laelius targaryeni Barbosa & Azevedo, 2014 - Brazil
- Laelius tibialis Kieffer, 1906 - France
- Laelius titanokkos Barbosa & Azevedo, 2011 - Thailand
- Laelius tullyi Barbosa & Azevedo, 2014 - Brazil
- Laelius utilis Cockcrell, 1920 - Canada, Sweden, USA
- Laelius versicolor (Evans, 1970) - Virgin Islands
- Laelius virilis Vikberg, 2005 - Finland
- Laelius voracis Muesebeck, 1939 - India, USA
- Laelius yamatonis Terayama, 2006 - Japan
- Laelius yokohamensis Terayama, 2006 - Japan

Extinct species:

- Laelius rovnensis Barbosa & Azevedo, 2012
- Laelius preteritus Barbosa & Azevedo, 2012
- Laelius pallidus Brues, 1933
- Laelius nudipennis Brues, 1933
