= Anthrenus fernandezi =

Scientific classification
- Kingdom: Animalia
- Phylum: Arthropoda
- Class: Insecta
- Order: Coleoptera
- Suborder: Polyphaga
- Family: Dermestidae
- Genus: Anthrenus
- Subgenus: Anthrenodes
- Species: A. fernandezi

Binomial name
- Anthrenus fernandezi Háva, 2003

Species of beetle

Anthrenus (Anthrenodes) fernandezi is a species of carpet beetle found in Burkina Faso, Cameroon, Nigeria, and Chad.
