= Anthrenus kejvali =

Scientific classification
- Kingdom: Animalia
- Phylum: Arthropoda
- Class: Insecta
- Order: Coleoptera
- Suborder: Polyphaga
- Family: Dermestidae
- Genus: Anthrenus
- Subgenus: Anthrenodes
- Species: A. kejvali

Binomial name
- Anthrenus kejvali Háva, 2000

Species of beetle

Anthrenus (Anthrenodes) kejvali is a species of carpet beetle found in India (Nilgiri Hills).
