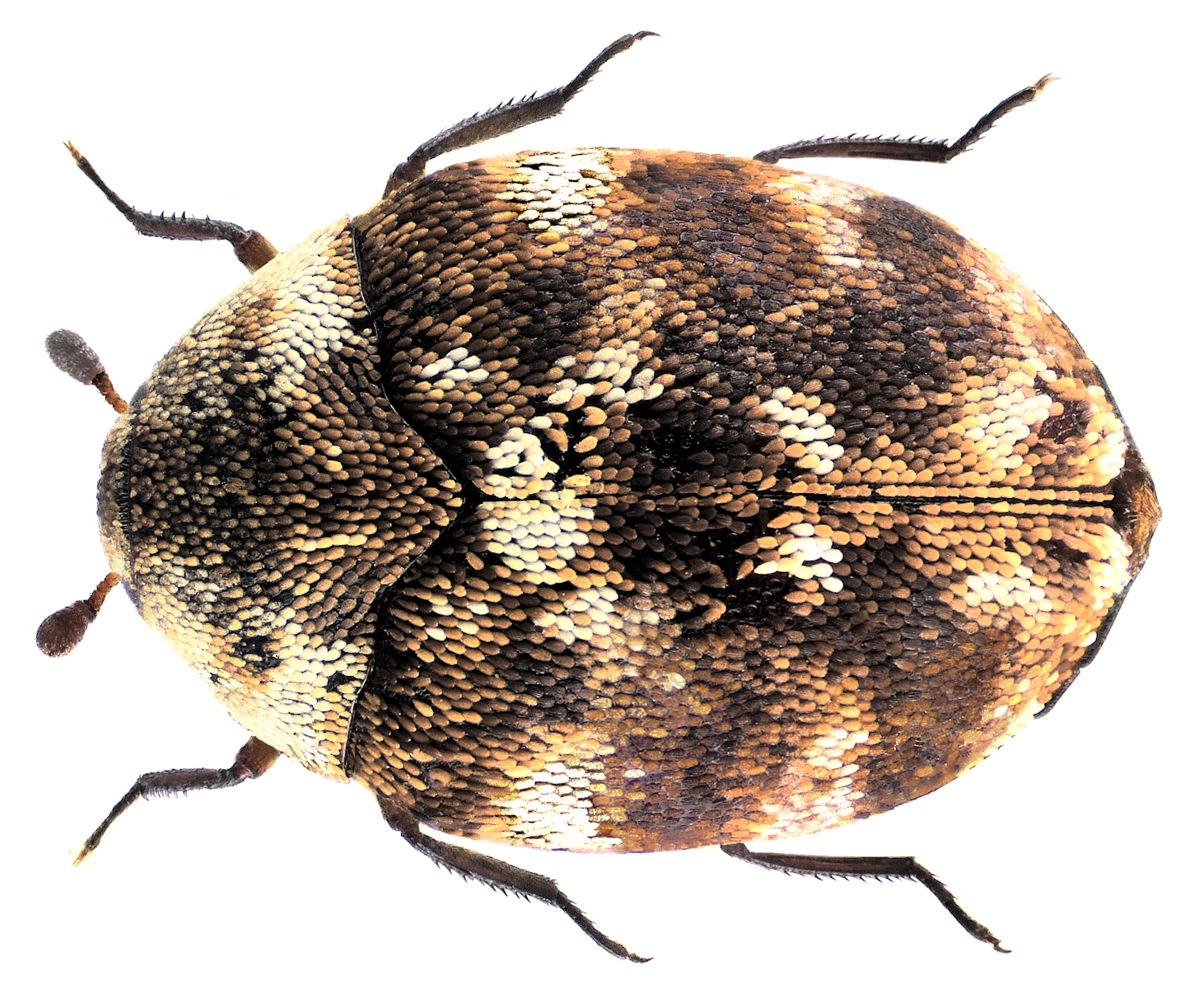

Scientific classification
- Kingdom: Animalia
- Phylum: Arthropoda
- Class: Insecta
- Order: Coleoptera
- Suborder: Polyphaga
- Family: Dermestidae
- Genus: Anthrenus
- Subgenus: Anthrenodes
- Species: A. malkini

Binomial name
- Anthrenus malkini Mroczkowski, 1980

= Anthrenus malkini =

Species of beetle

Anthrenus malkini is a species of carpet beetle in the subgenus Anthrenodes of the genus Anthrenus, family Dermestidae. It is known from Oman, Qatar, Saudi Arabia, United Arab Emirates, and Yemen.
