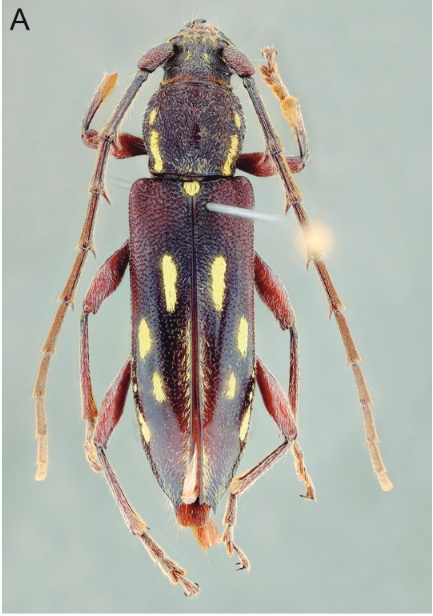

Scientific classification
- Kingdom: Animalia
- Phylum: Arthropoda
- Clade: Pancrustacea
- Class: Insecta
- Order: Coleoptera
- Suborder: Polyphaga
- Infraorder: Cucujiformia
- Family: Cerambycidae
- Genus: Ambonus
- Species: A. distinctus

Binomial name
- Ambonus distinctus (Newman, 1840)

Synonyms
- Trichophorus distinctus Newman, 1840

= Ambonus distinctus =

Species of beetle

Ambonus distinctus is a species of beetle in the family Cerambycidae. It was described by Newman in 1840. It is found in Bolivia, French Guiana, Brazil, Paraguay and Argentina.
