= Acanthocephaloides =

Scientific classification
- Kingdom: Animalia
- Phylum: Acanthocephala
- Class: Palaeacanthocephala
- Order: Echinorhynchida
- Family: Arhythmacanthidae
- Genus: Acanthocephaloides; Meyer, 1932

Synonyms
- Neoacanthocephaloides Cable & Quick, 1954

Genus of worms

Acanthocephaloides is a genus of parasitic worms belonging to the family Arhythmacanthidae.

== Taxonomy ==
A phylogenetic study has been conducted on Acanthocephaloides propinquus.

== Description ==
Acanthocephaloides species consist of a proboscis covered in hooks and a long trunk.

== Species ==
Species:

- Acanthocephaloides claviformis Araki & Machida, 1987
- Acanthocephaloides cyrusi Bray, Spencer-Jones & Lewis, 1988
- Acanthocephaloides delamuri (Parukhin, 1989) Amin, 2013
- Acanthocephaloides distinctus Golvan, 1969
- Acanthocephaloides geneticus Buron, Renaud & Euzet, 1985
- Acanthocephaloides ichiharai Araki & Machida, 1987
- Acanthocephaloides irregularis Amin, Oğuz, Heckman, Tepe & Kvach, 2011
- Acanthocephaloides neobythitis Yamaguti, 1939
- Acanthocephaloides nicoli (Kumar, 1992) Amin, 2013
- Acanthocephaloides plagiusae Santana-Pineros, Cruz-Quintana, Centeno-Chale & Vidal-Martinez, 2013
- Acanthocephaloides rhinoplagusiae Yamaguti, 1935
- Acanthocephaloides spinicaudatus (Cable & Quick, 1954) Pichelin & Cribb, 1999

== Distribution ==
The distribution of Acanthocephaloides is determined by that of its hosts. The species of this genus are found in Europe.

== Hosts ==
Life cycle of Acanthocephala. (Note: There are no known aberrant human infections for Acanthocephaloides species.)

The life cycle of an acanthocephalan consists of three stages beginning when an infective acanthor (development of an egg) is released from the intestines of the definitive host and then ingested by an arthropod, the intermediate host. Although the intermediate hosts of Acanthocephaloides are arthropods. When the acanthor molts, the second stage called the acanthella begins. This stage involves penetrating the wall of the mesenteron or the intestine of the intermediate host and growing. The final stage is the infective cystacanth which is the larval or juvenile state of an Acanthocephalan, differing from the adult only in size and stage of sexual development. The cystacanths within the intermediate hosts are consumed by the definitive host, usually attaching to the walls of the intestines, and as adults they reproduce sexually in the intestines. The acanthor is passed in the feces of the definitive host and the cycle repeats. There may be paratenic hosts (hosts where parasites infest but do not undergo larval development or sexual reproduction) for Acanthocephaloides.

Acanthocephaloides parasitizes animals. There are no reported cases of Acanthocephaloides infesting humans in the English language medical literature.
