= Laelius centratus =

Scientific classification
- Kingdom: Animalia
- Phylum: Arthropoda
- Class: Insecta
- Order: Hymenoptera
- Family: Bethylidae
- Genus: Laelius
- Species: L. centratus

Binomial name
- Laelius centratus (Say, 1836)

Synonyms
- Bethylus centratus Say, 1836; Laelius occidentalis Whittaker, 1929; Laelius trogodermatis Ashmead, 1893; Paralaelius centratus (Say, 1836)

Species of insect

Laelius centratus is a hymenopteran parasitoid in the family Bethylidae. It is a gregarious idiobiont larval ectoparasitoid of the larvae of small dermestid beetles. It has been reported from Canada, Mexico, and the USA.

Known hosts are:

- Trogoderma parabile Beal
- Trogoderma simplex Jayne
- Trogoderma versicolor Creutz
