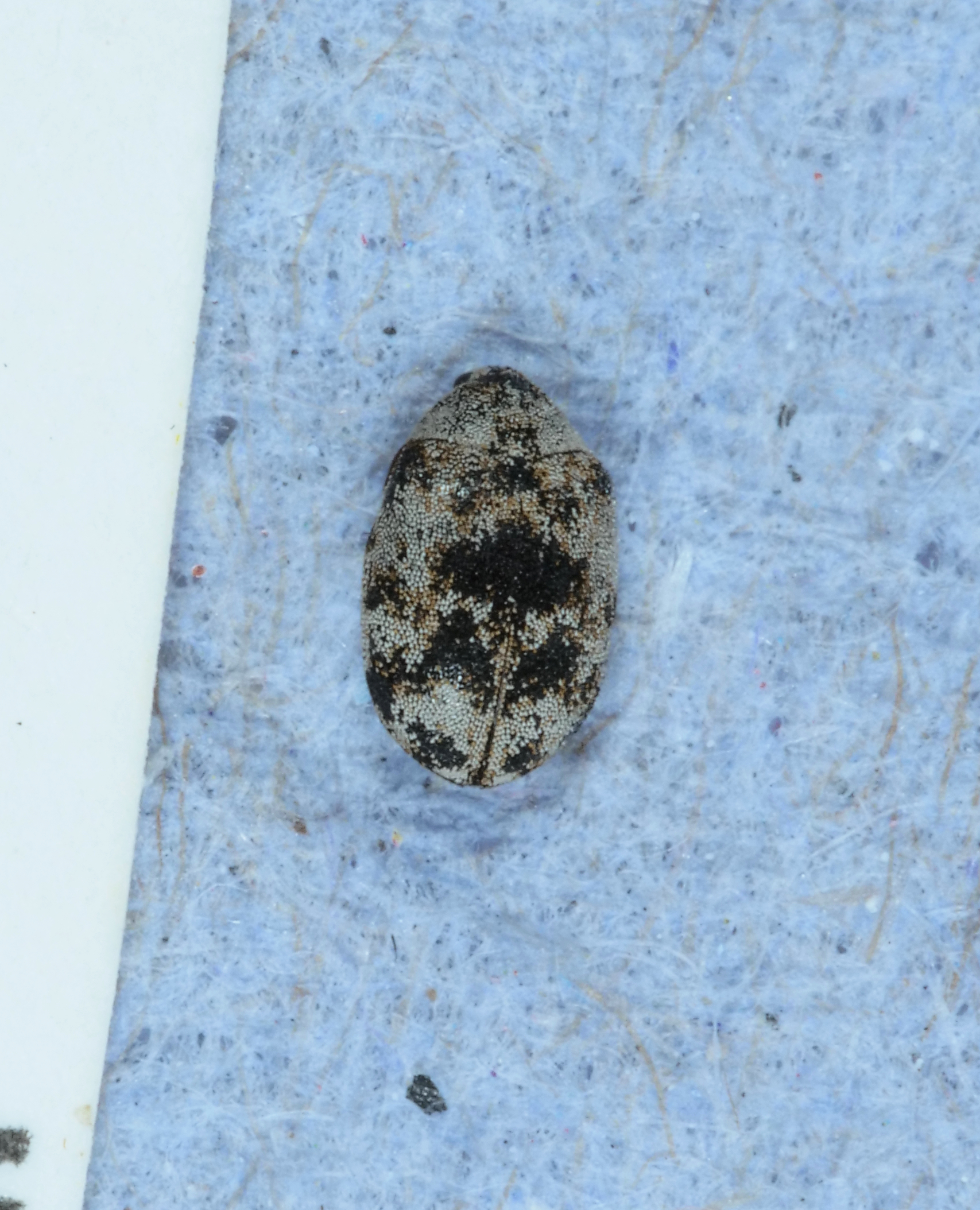
- Dorsal view

Scientific classification
- Domain: Eukaryota
- Kingdom: Animalia
- Phylum: Arthropoda
- Class: Insecta
- Order: Coleoptera
- Suborder: Polyphaga
- Family: Dermestidae
- Genus: Anthrenus
- Subgenus: Anthrenodes
- Species: A. sarnicus

Binomial name
- Anthrenus sarnicus Mroczkowski, 1963

= Anthrenus sarnicus =

Species of beetle

Anthrenus sarnicus, the Guernsey carpet beetle, is a type of carpet beetle ('Sarnia' is the Latin name for Guernsey). It can be generally found in Great Britain. Its suborder is Polyphaga, the infraorder is Bostrichiformia, the superfamily is Bostrichoidea, and the family is Dermestidae. The carpet beetle is shaped like an oval and about the size of a pin.

== Description ==
=== Diet ===
Carpet beetles are known for eating away at carpets and rugs. Their diet consists of feathers, furs, insects, dead animals, processed human food, skins, cotton, silk, and wool.

=== Predators ===
A variety of predators like ants and spiders will feed on carpet beetle larvae. No predators will exclusively eat carpet beetles and the larvae will hide in dark places to avoid them.

=== Life cycle ===
All carpet beetles will go through metamorphism during their lives. They will pass through the egg, larval, and pupal points to reach full maturity. This can take two months to many years. Female carpet beetles can lay over 100 eggs which can hatch after 10–44 days at temperatures between 15 °C (59 °F) and 32.5 °C (90.5 °F), ideally at 25 °C (77 °F). Four generations of carpet beetles can develop every year. It can take 9 months to 2 years for a carpet beetle to become a full adult. However, adults only survive for a couple of weeks. The adults are skillful fliers and can live for many weeks without food. In the UK, it was found that between June and September, the beetles mostly stay outdoors, migrating indoors during the rest of the year.

=== As a pest ===
Signs of an infestation are spotting their pellets and skin. One should also expect to see the adult beetles and their larvae. Adult guernsey carpet beetles have patches of brown, white, and black. They move slowly and when touched they will roll over. The source of the infestations can be identified by looking for where there are more beetles, skins, and feces.
