= Abacetus distinctus =

Scientific classification
- Domain: Eukaryota
- Kingdom: Animalia
- Phylum: Arthropoda
- Class: Insecta
- Order: Coleoptera
- Suborder: Adephaga
- Family: Carabidae
- Genus: Abacetus
- Species: A. distinctus

Binomial name
- Abacetus distinctus Chaudoir, 1878

Species of insect

Abacetus distinctus is a species of ground beetle in the subfamily Pterostichinae. It was described by Maximilien Chaudoir in 1878.
