= Anthrenus distinctus =

Scientific classification
- Kingdom: Animalia
- Phylum: Arthropoda
- Class: Insecta
- Order: Coleoptera
- Suborder: Polyphaga
- Family: Dermestidae
- Genus: Anthrenus
- Subgenus: Anthrenodes
- Species: A. distinctus

Binomial name
- Anthrenus distinctus Kadej & Háva, 2006

Species of beetle

Anthrenus (Anthrenodes) distinctus is a species of carpet beetle found in Afghanistan.
