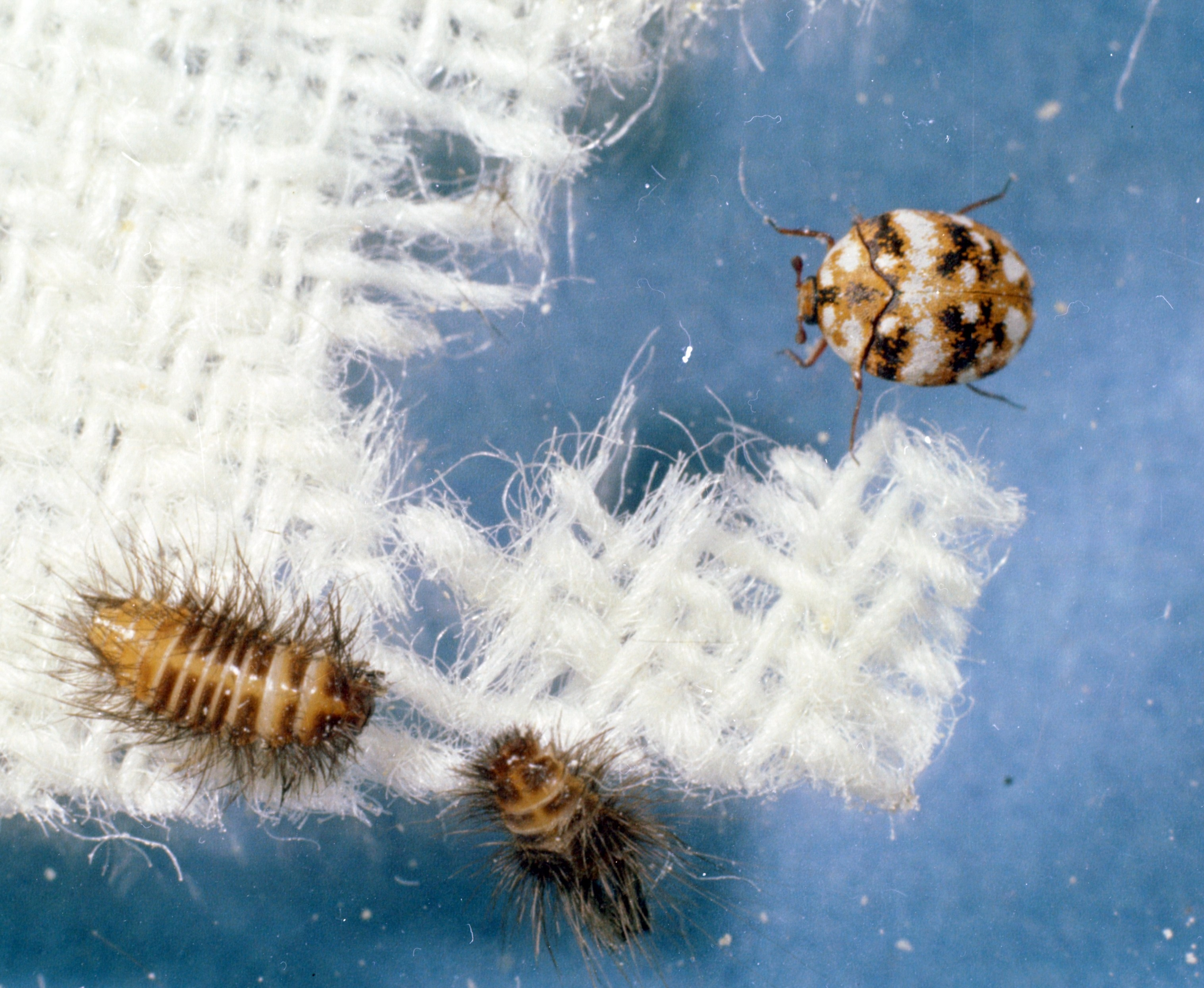
- larvae and adult

Scientific classification
- Kingdom: Animalia
- Phylum: Arthropoda
- Clade: Pancrustacea
- Class: Insecta
- Order: Coleoptera
- Suborder: Polyphaga
- Family: Dermestidae
- Genus: Anthrenus
- Species: A. flavipes

Binomial name
- Anthrenus flavipes (LeConte, 1854)

= Anthrenus flavipes =

Species of beetle

Anthrenus flavipes is a species of beetle in the family Dermestidae known by the common name furniture carpet beetle. It has a cosmopolitan distribution, occurring throughout the world, being most active in warmer climates. It is a pest that damages household materials such as textiles.

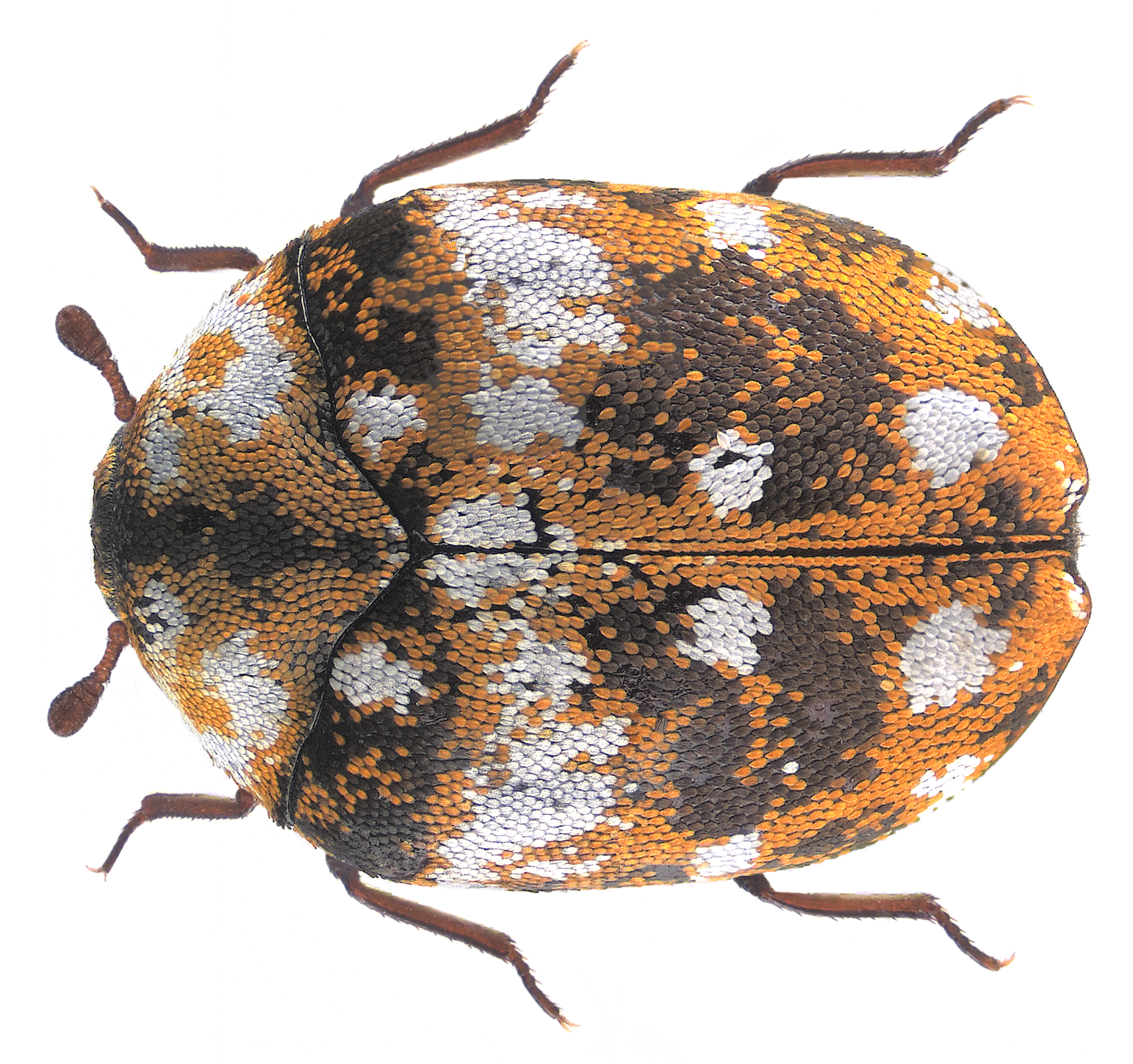
Anthrenus flavipes ssp. flavipes

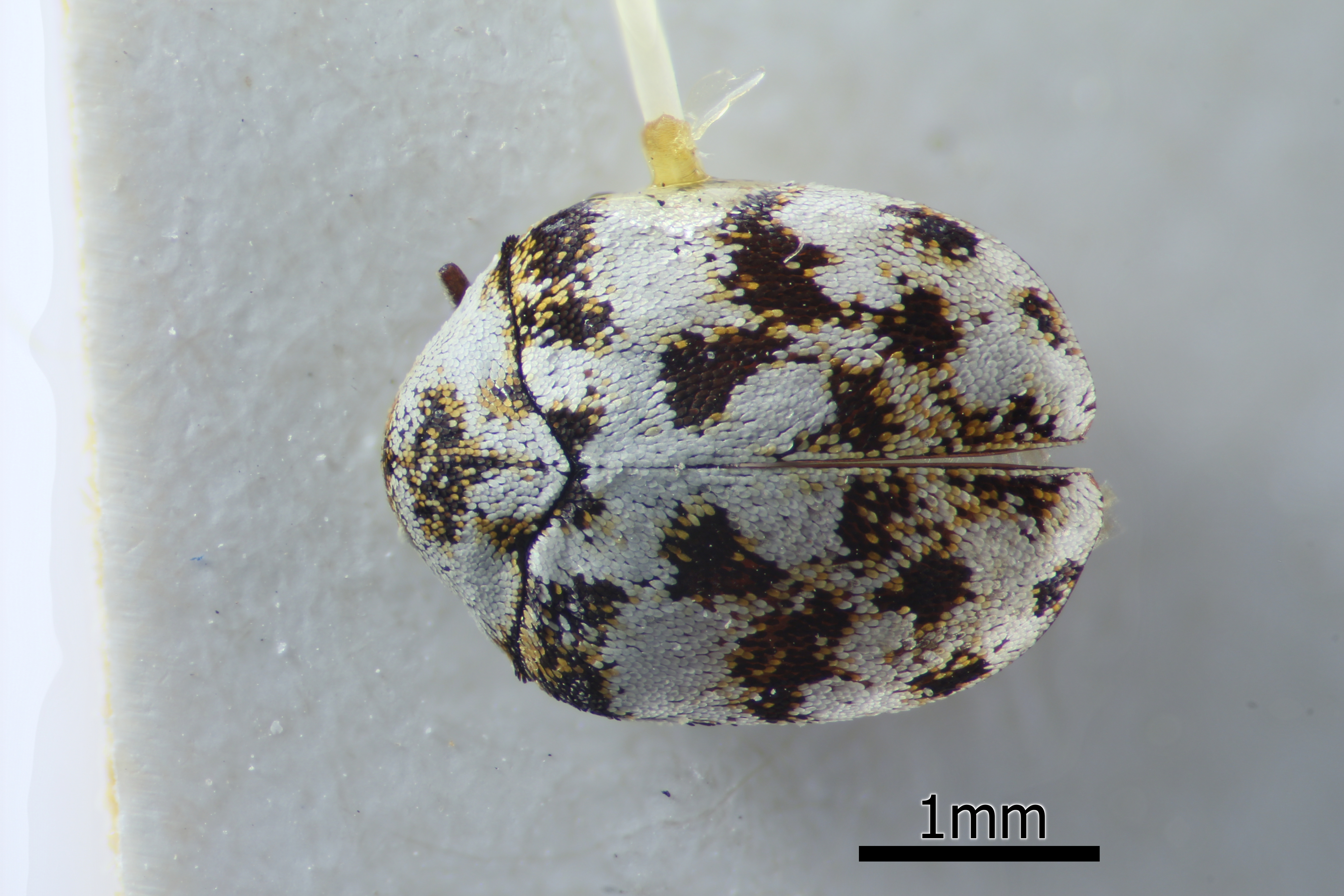
Anthrenus flavipes var. seminiveus

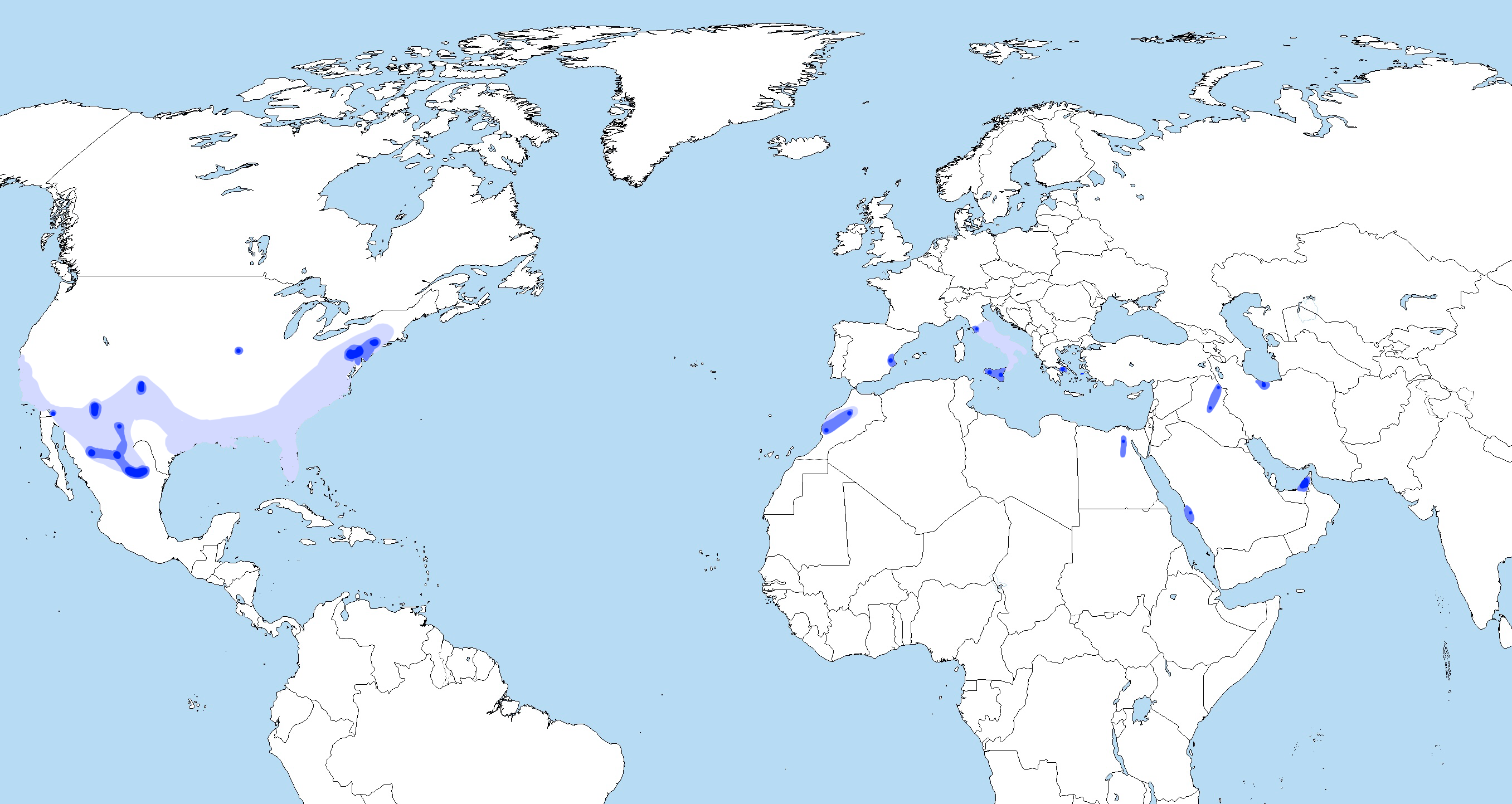
Habitat map

== Description ==
This beetle is 2 to 3.5 millimeters long and round in shape. It is black with variable patterns of white and yellow mottling. The legs are covered in yellow scales. It looks similar to other carpet beetles, but its tiny body scales are rounded or oval, while those of other carpet beetles are longer and narrower. Each antenna is tipped with a club.

During its adult lifespan of 30 to 60 days, the female beetle lays up to 100 white eggs. The eggs are visible but less than one millimeter long. The larvae emerge in one to three weeks. The larva is oval or "carrot-shaped" and about 5 millimeters long at its final stage. It varies in color according to diet and it is coated in long, brown hairs. The larva of this species can be distinguished from that of its relative, the common carpet beetle (Anthrenus scrophulariae), by the presence of a bundle of hairs on the posterior end which is constantly vibrating. This bundle, located just above the anus, is called the supra-anal organ. All instar stages of the larva have the organ, and there is a specific number of hairs in it at each instar. The vibration of the organ is an antipredator adaptation that helps to repel predators such as pseudoscorpions (Chelifer sp.) and the parasitoid wasp Laelius pedatus.

After progressing through six to thirty instars over 2 to 3 months, the larva pupates for 2 or 3 weeks.

== Biology ==
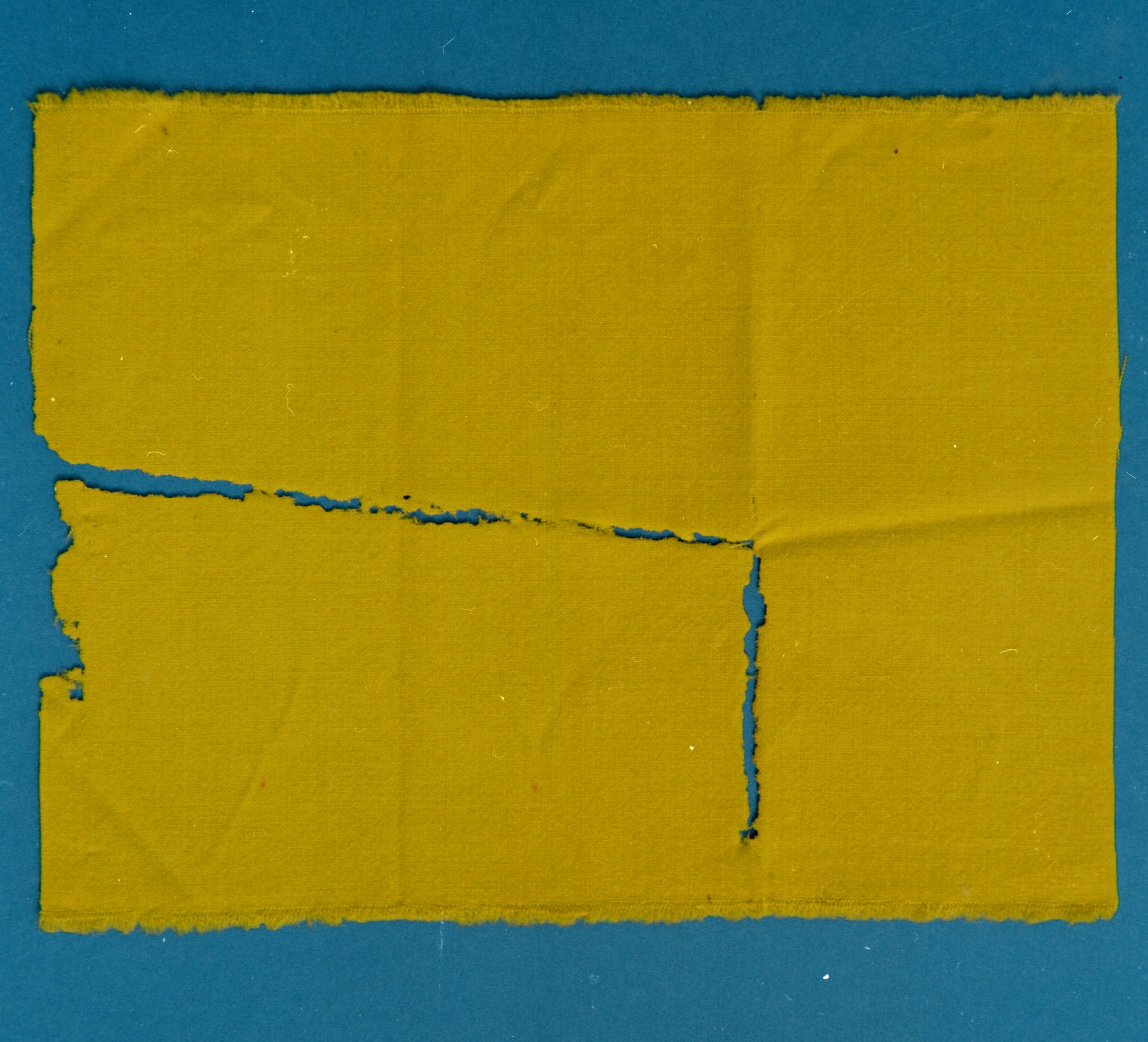
Damage to cloth

=== Reproduction ===
Sexual behavior includes a "characteristic headstand posture" assumed by the female beetle when she releases her sex pheromone, which has been identified as (Z)-3-decenoic acid.

=== Diet and impacts ===
This beetle is more common in warm regions, but it can inhabit heated buildings in cooler areas. The adult beetle feeds on pollen and nectar, often from plants of the parsley family. The larva is responsible for the damage that makes the species notorious. It can digest keratin, and its diet is made up largely of a variety of animal tissues and products constructed from them. It feeds on hair and fur, horns, silk, wool, bristles, feathers, skin, bone, and tortoise shell. In nature, carpet beetles live and feed in the nests of birds, rodents, insects, and spiders. This species also readily attacks plant-based and synthetic materials if they have animal fibers integrated into them or are stained with blood, feces, or animal-derived oils. It does significant damage to upholstered furniture, carpets, and fabrics of cotton, linen, rayon, and jute.

It is also a pest of museums and collections when it attacks biological specimens such as dried insects and taxidermy. In libraries and archives it consumes materials derived from leather and skins, such as book bindings and parchment.

The larva has also been noted to feed on mold, dry cheese, and casein, and it can damage wood and cardboard.

== Management ==
Infestations in the home can be identified by the presence of larvae, their molted cuticula, and their damage, which can be obvious. The tiny adult beetles are present in warmer months. Furniture and other susceptible objects should be vacuumed to remove hairs and loose fibers. Some objects require steam cleaning or dry cleaning. Materials should be kept clean of animal oils. Furs can be protected in cold storage, and museum specimens may be frozen. An insecticide is sometimes used, mainly around carpets and rugs, as a dust such as diatomaceous earth or silica aerogel, a spray, or an emulsion. Fumigation is used in severe cases. It has been noted that mothballs are ineffective.
