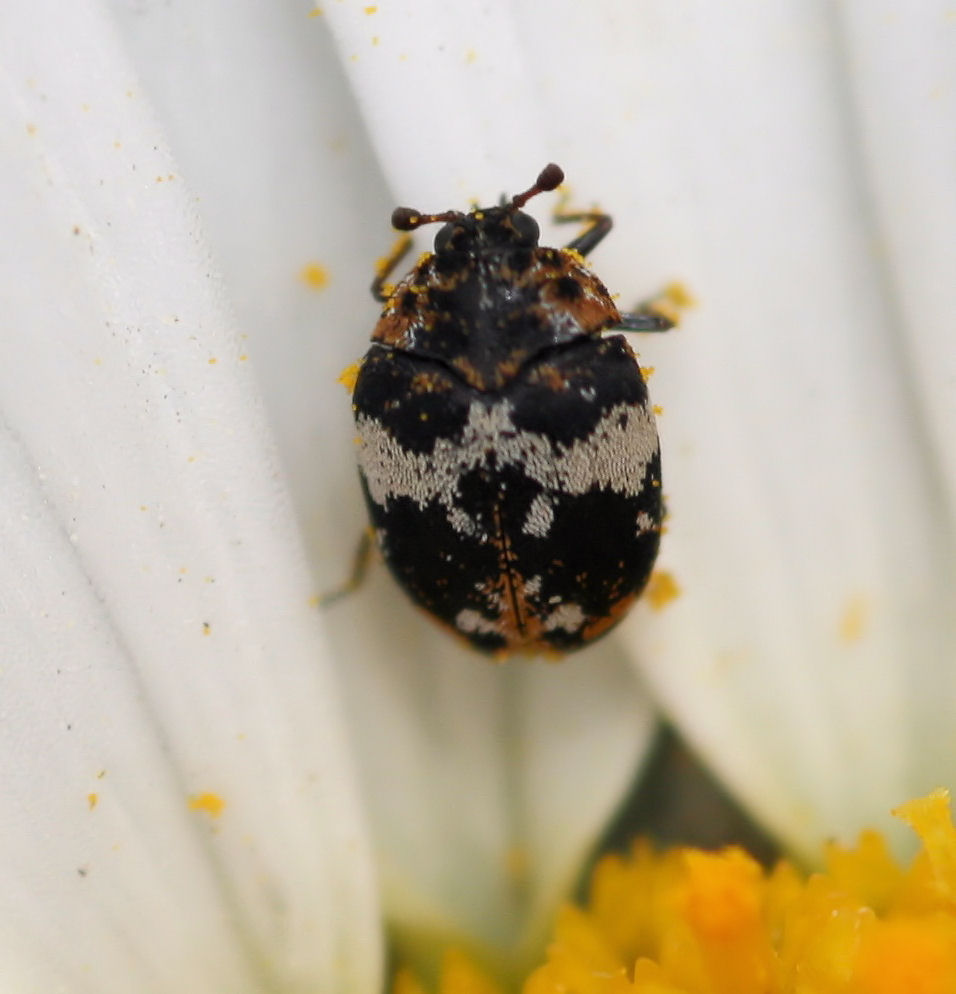
- Anthrenus pimpinellae
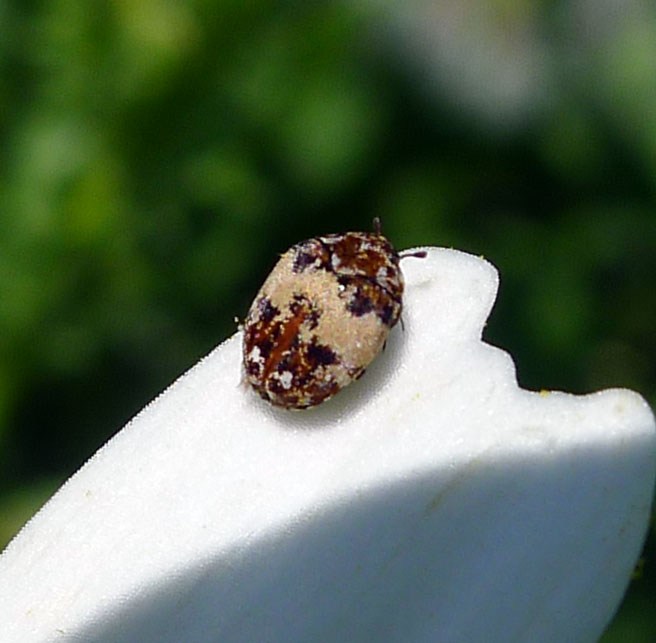
- Anthrenus isabellinus

Scientific classification
- Kingdom: Animalia
- Phylum: Arthropoda
- Clade: Pancrustacea
- Class: Insecta
- Order: Coleoptera
- Suborder: Polyphaga
- Family: Dermestidae
- Genus: Anthrenus
- Subgenus: Anthrenus
- Species group: Anthrenus pimpinellae complex

Species
- See text

= Anthrenus pimpinellae complex =

Species group of beetles

Anthrenus pimpinellae complex is a group of closely related species from subgenus Anthrenus. Most species that currently belong to the group were previously assigned as subspecies of Anthrenus pimpinellae.

== Species ==
According to various sources, such as World Dermestidae catalogue and new research, these species currently belong to the group:

- Anthrenus almatyensis (Háva, 2018) – Kazakhstan
- Anthrenus amandae (Holloway, 2019) – Spain (Mallorca)
- Anthrenus angustefasciatus (Ganglbauer, 1904) – Europe (Belgium, Bosnia and Herzegovina, Croatia, Czech Republic, United Kingdom, France, Germany, Italy, Monaco, Portugal, Serbia, Spain, Switzerland); Turkey; Algeria; Morocco; Tunisia
- Anthrenus corona (Holloway, 2021) – Armenia; Austria; Bosnia; Bulgaria; Croatia; Georgia; Greece; Hungary; Italy; Macedonia; Montenegro; Portugal; Romania; Serbia; Sicily; Spain; Turkey; Iran; Jordan; Syria
- Anthrenus delicatus (Kiesenwetter, 1851) – Europe: Albania, Andorra, Bosnia and Herzegovina, Bulgaria, Croatia, Cyprus, France, Greece (with Crete), Italy, Macedonia, Montenegro, Portugal, Romania, Serbia, Spain; Caucasus region (Armenia, Azerbaijan, Georgia); North Africa (Algeria, Egypt, Morocco, Tunisia); Middle East (Turkey, Israel, Jordan, Syria, Iran)
- Anthrenus farsicus (Kadej & Háva, 2011) – Iran (Fars, Kerman)
- Anthrenus festivus (Erichson, 1846) – Europe: Austria, France, Germany, Portugal, Italy (only Sardinia and Sicily), Spain (with Balearic Islands), Switzerland; North Africa (Morocco, Tunisia) and Israel. Possibly in Cyprus
- Anthrenus flavidulus (Reitter, 1889) - Caucasus region (including Armenia); Middle East (Turkey, Iran, Syria, Jordan)
  - Anthrenus miniatulus (Reitter, 1899) (junior synonym) – Turkey; Jordan; Syria
- Anthrenus goliath (Saulcy in Mulsant & Rey, 1868) - North Africa (Algeria, Egypt, Morocco, Tunisia). Possibly in Libya and Syria
- Anthrenus hoberlandti (Kadej, Háva & Kalík, 2007) – Iran
- Anthrenus indicus (Kadej, Háva & Kalík, 2007) – India (Himachal Pradesh, Kashmir, Ladakh); Pakistan
- Anthrenus isabellinus (Küster, 1848) – France; Greece; Italy; Mallorca; Malta; Portugal, Spain; Algeria; Libya; Morocco; Tunisia; Israel. Introduced to United States (East)
- Anthrenus kafkai (Kadej & Háva, 2011) – Iran
- Anthrenus latefasciatus (Reitter, 1892) – Russia (South-West and Far East); China (North); Turkey; Afghanistan; Caucasus region; Iran; Mongolia; North Korea; Pakistan; Syria; Central Asia (Kazakhstan, Kyrgyzstan, Tajikistan, Turkmenistan, Uzbekistan)
- Anthrenus mesopotamicus (Háva, 2001) – Iran; Iraq; Syria
- Anthrenus mroczkowskii (Kalík, 1954) – Albania; Bosnia and Herzegovina; Bulgaria; Corsica; Crete; Croatia; Greece; Italy; Macedonia; Slovenia; Turkey; Lebanon
- Anthrenus munroi (Hinton, 1943) – Bulgaria; Corsica; Cyprus; France; Greece; Italy; Macedonia; Portugal; Sardinia; Spain; Turkey; Ukraine (Crimea); Algeria; Libya; Morocco; Tunisia; Israel; Jordan; Lebanon; Syria
- Anthrenus nipponensis (Kalík & Ohbayashi, 1985) – Northern China and bordering territories in Russia; Japan; North Korea;
- Anthrenus oceanicus (Fauvel, 1903) – China (Guangdong, Jiangsu); India (Andhra Pradesh, Tamil Nadu); Indonesia (Java, Madura); Malaysia; Pakistan; Singapore; Sri Lanka; Taiwan; Australia; Cook Islands; French Polynesia (Tahiti); New Caledonia; Papua New Guinea, United States (Hawaiian Islands). Introduced to parts of Europe and Africa: Czech Republic; United Kingdom; Malta; Egypt; Congo; Mauritius; Nigeria; Reunion; Tanzania
- Anthrenus pfefferi (Kalík, 1954) – Croatia; Greece (with Crete); Italy
- Anthrenus pimpinellae (Fabricius, 1775) - Europe (from France to Southwest Russia). The species is still noted in other parts of the world: Asia, North Africa, Australia, United States. However, these additional records are disputed and do not provide reliable information on the distribution of the species, as they come from historical misidentification of related species within the complex, rather than accurate records of A. pimpinellae
- Anthrenus similaris (Kadej, Háva & Kalík, 2007) – Iran; Turkmenistan
- Anthrenus smetanai (Kadej & Háva, 2011) – Algeria; Morocco; Tunisia
- Anthrenus warchalowskii (Kadej, Háva & Kalík, 2007) – Iran
- Anthrenus chikatunovi (Holloway, 2020) – Southern France, Spain
- Anthrenus bakaloudisi (Holloway, Thanasoulias & Herrmann, 2024) – Greece (Macedonia)
- Anthrenus muehlei (Holloway & Herrmann, 2024) – Iran
