= A. aterrimus =

A. aterrimus may refer to:

- Abacetus aterrimus, a ground beetle found in South Africa
- Afreumenes aterrimus, a wasp
- Anthrenus aterrimus, a carpet beetle found in Kenya and Tanzania
