= A. aethiopicus =

A. aethiopicus may refer to:

- Acteon aethiopicus, a sea snail
- Afreumenes aethiopicus, a wasp
- Allogaster aethiopicus, a longhorned beetle
- Allurjapyx aethiopicus, a bristletail
- Asparagus aethiopicus, known as Sprenger's asparagus
- Australopithecus aethiopicus, a synonym of Paranthropus aethiopicus, an extinct hominin
