= Anthrenus pushkini =

Scientific classification
- Kingdom: Animalia
- Phylum: Arthropoda
- Class: Insecta
- Order: Coleoptera
- Suborder: Polyphaga
- Family: Dermestidae
- Genus: Anthrenus
- Subgenus: Anthrenus
- Species: A. pushkini

Binomial name
- Anthrenus pushkini Herrmann, Kadej & Háva, 2016

Species of beetle

Anthrenus (Anthrenus) pushkini is a species of carpet beetle found in Russia (Dagestan). The species is closely related to Anthrenus crustaceus.

== Etymology ==
The name of the species is dedicated to Sergey Viktorovich Pushkin (Stavropol, Russia), a researcher from North-Caucasus Federal University and also the collector of type specimens.
