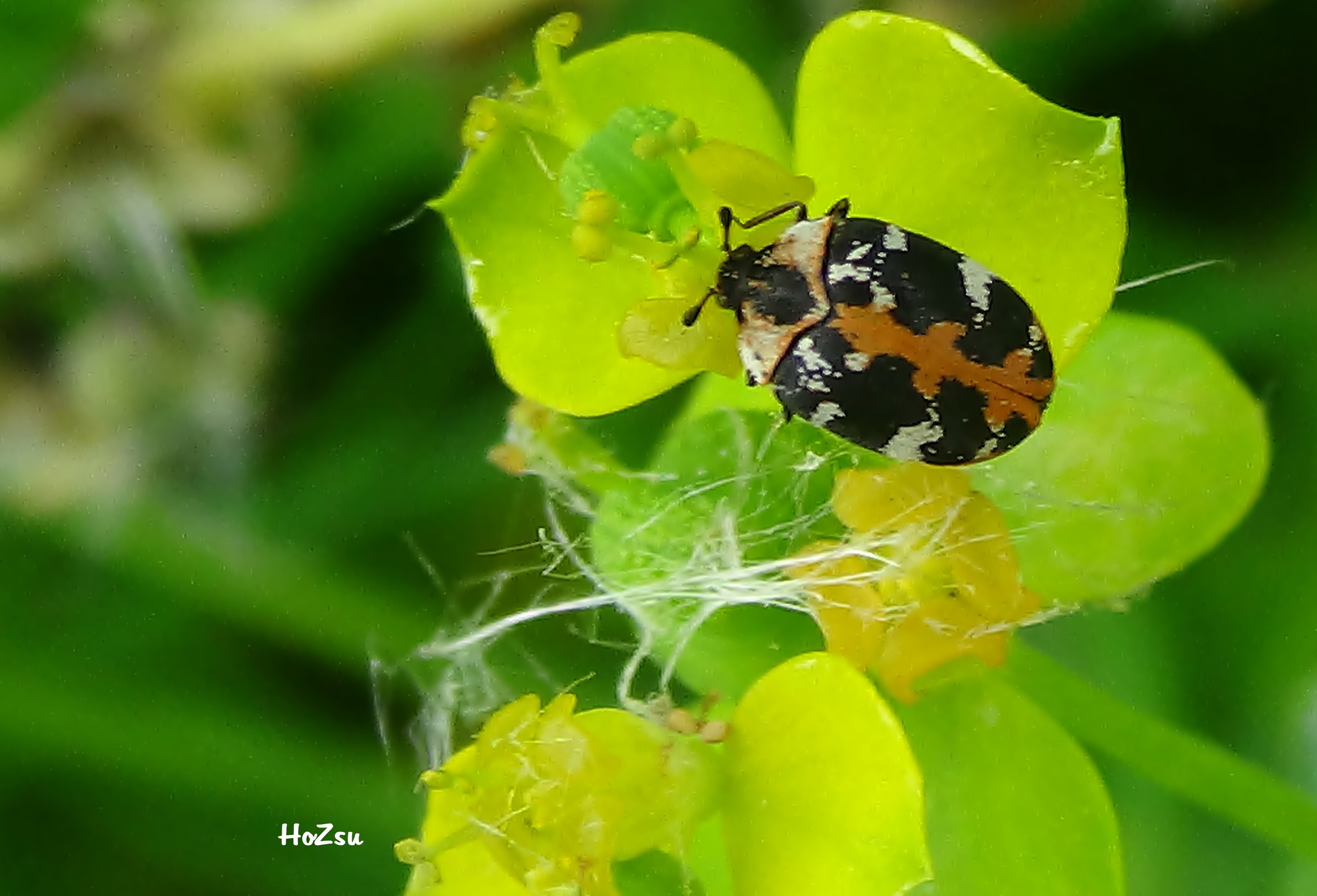
- Anthrenus (Anthrenus) scrophulariae
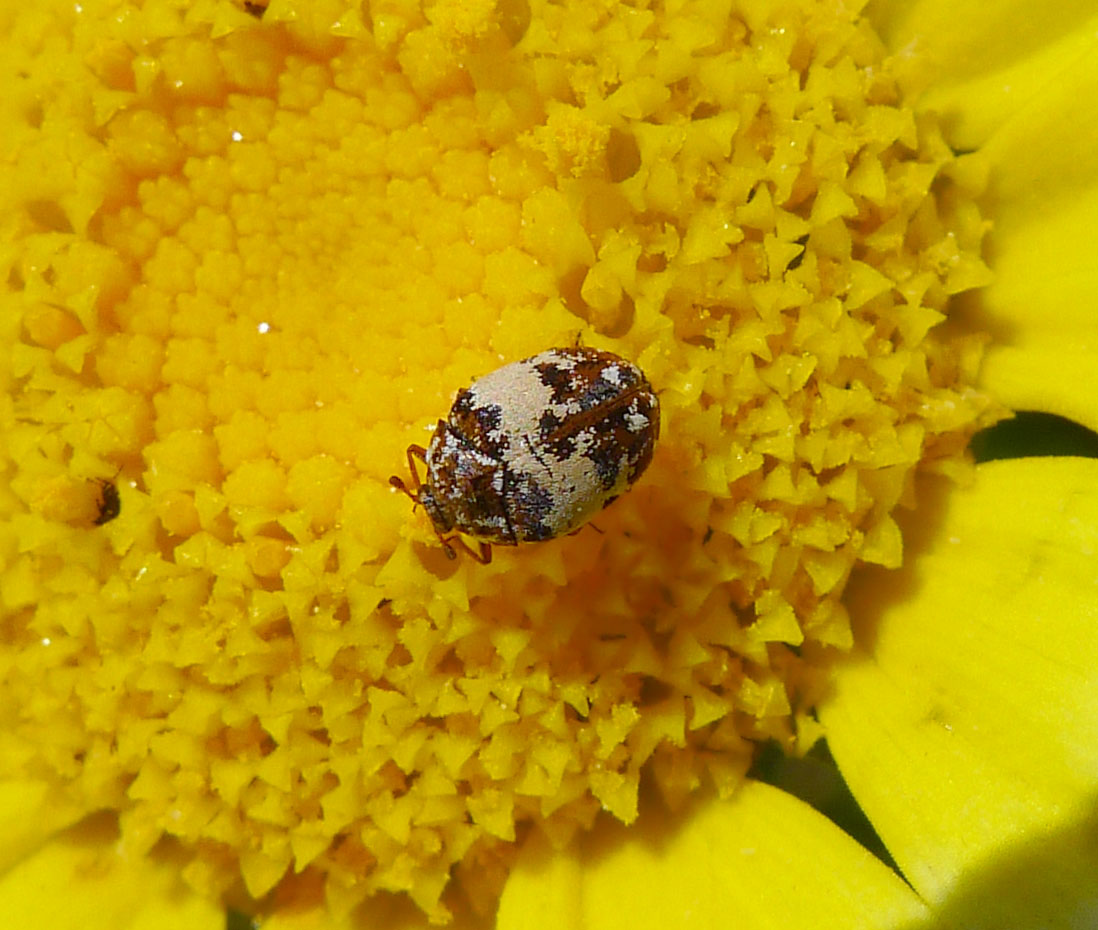
- Anthrenus (Anthrenus) isabellinus, a species from Anthrenus pimpinellae complex

Scientific classification
- Domain: Eukaryota
- Kingdom: Animalia
- Phylum: Arthropoda
- Class: Insecta
- Order: Coleoptera
- Suborder: Polyphaga
- Family: Dermestidae
- Genus: Anthrenus
- Subgenus: Anthrenus; Geoffroy, 1762

Species
- See text.

= Anthrenus (subgenus) =

Subgenus of beetles

Anthrenus is a subgenus of the genus Anthrenus of the subfamily Megatominae within the family of skin beetles.

Subgenus is distinguished by antennae with 11 segments. Occasionally, male specimen appear with 10 antennae segments, having one less "filler" segment in the middle. Inner edge of eye is indented, as opposed to subgenus Nathrenus.

== Species ==
These species currently belong to the subgenus Anthrenus, with several mostly informal species groups recognized by researchers. The further division into groups mostly follows the definitions provided in the World Catalogue of Dermestidae by Jirí Háva:

=== Species group "crustaceus" ===
- Anthrenus crustaceus (Reitter, 1881) – Middle East (Turkey, Israel, Saudi Arabia, Syria, Yemen), Africa (Egypt, Eritrea), India (Gujarat)
- Anthrenus kaliki (Pic, 1952) – Algeria
- Anthrenus kabateki (Háva, 2014) – Western Sahara
- Anthrenus kubistai (Háva & Votruba, 2005) – Sudan
- Anthrenus linnavuorii (Háva, 2014) – Sudan (Blue Nile)
- Anthrenus paulyi (Háva, 2003) – West Africa (Burkina Faso, Ivory Coast)
- Anthrenus pushkini (Herrmann, Kadej & Háva, 2016) – Russia (Dagestan)
- Anthrenus senegalensis (Pic, 1927) – Africa: Benin, Gambia, Guinea Bissau, Senegal, Sierra Leone, Togo
- Anthrenus socotranus (Háva, 2017) – Yemen (Socotra Islands)

=== Species group "flavipes" ===
- Anthrenus ardoi (Kadej & Háva, 2011) – Oman, United Arab Emirates
- Anthrenus aterrimus (Gerstäcker, 1871) – Kenya; Tanzania
- Anthrenus bartolozzii (Háva, 2003) – Ethiopia; Kenya; Malawi; Tanzania
- Anthrenus botswaniensis (Háva & Kadej, 2006) – Botswana
- Anthrenus coacheorum (Háva, 2022) – Senegal
- Anthrenus cornelli (Háva & Herrmann, 2008) – Tanzania
- Anthrenus flavipes
  - Anthrenus flavipes flavipes (LeConte, 1854) – Cosmopolitan
  - Anthrenus flavipes albopunctatus (Pic, 1894) – Afghanistan; Iran; Russia (Tatarstan); Syria; Turkmenistan; Uzbekistan
- Anthrenus kantneri (Háva, 2003) – Malawi; Mozambique; Tanzania; Zambia; Zimbabwe
- Anthrenus katerinae (Háva & Kadej, 2006) – Angola; Namibia
- Anthrenus klichai (Herrmann, Kadej & Háva, 2016) – Zambia
- Anthrenus lilligi (Háva & Herrmann, 2008) – Zimbabwe
- Anthrenus lindbergi (Mroczkowski, 1959) – Afghanistan; Pakistan
- Anthrenus lopatini (Zhantiev, 1976) – Pakistan; Tajikistan; Turkmenistan
- Anthrenus maharashtranus (Háva, 2002) – India (Maharashtra)
- Anthrenus merkli (Háva, 2003) – Kenya; Somalia; Tanzania
- Anthrenus namibicus (Háva, 2000) – Namibia
- Anthrenus rauterbergi (Reitter, 1908) – Egypt
- Anthrenus rotundulus (Reitter, 1889) – Turkey; Egypt; Afghanistan; Caucasus region (Armenia included); Iran; Pakistan; Turkmenistan
- Anthrenus safad (Háva, 2013) – United Arab Emirates
- Anthrenus seideli (Háva, 2021) – Namibia
- Anthrenus simonis (Reitter, 1881) – Turkey; Egypt; Libya; Tunisia; Iran; Iraq; Israel; Syria
- Anthrenus x-signum (Reitter, 1881) – Corsica; Algeria; Egypt; Eritrea; Libya; Morocco; Tunisia; Israel; Jordan

=== Species group "maculatus" ===
- Anthrenus maculatus (Fabricius, 1798) – Mexico (Baja California, Sonora); United States (Arizona, California, Colorado, Nevada, New Mexico, Texas, Utah)
- Anthrenus pueblanus (Háva, 2021) – Mexico (Puebla)
- Anthrenus pulaskii (Kadej, 2011) – United States (California)
- Anthrenus umbra (Beal, 1998) – Mexico (Sonora); United States (Arizona)

=== Species group "pimpinellae" ===
Species belonging to Anthrenus pimpinellae complex could be hard to distinguish in field conditions due to often only minor differences in visual appearance between most species

- Anthrenus almatyensis (Háva, 2018) – Kazakhstan
- Anthrenus amandae (Holloway, 2019) – Spain (Mallorca)
- Anthrenus angustefasciatus (Ganglbauer, 1904) – Europe (Belgium, Bosnia and Herzegovina, Croatia, Czech Republic, United Kingdom, France, Germany, Italy, Monaco, Portugal, Serbia, Spain, Switzerland); Turkey; Algeria; Morocco; Tunisia
- Anthrenus corona (Holloway, 2021) – Armenia; Austria; Bosnia; Bulgaria; Croatia; Georgia; Greece; Hungary; Italy; Macedonia; Montenegro; Portugal; Romania; Serbia; Sicily; Spain; Turkey; Iran; Jordan; Syria
- Anthrenus delicatus (Kiesenwetter, 1851) – Europe: Albania, Andorra, Bosnia and Herzegovina, Bulgaria, Croatia, Cyprus, France, Greece (with Crete), Italy, Macedonia, Montenegro, Portugal, Romania, Serbia, Spain; Caucasus region (Armenia, Azerbaijan, Georgia); North Africa (Algeria, Egypt, Morocco, Tunisia); Middle East (Turkey, Israel, Jordan, Syria, Iran)
- Anthrenus farsicus (Kadej & Háva, 2011) – Iran (Fars, Kerman)
- Anthrenus festivus (Erichson, 1846) – Europe: Austria, France, Germany, Portugal, Italy (only Sardinia and Sicily), Spain (with Balearic Islands), Switzerland; North Africa (Morocco, Tunisia) and Israel. Possibly in Cyprus
- Anthrenus flavidulus (Reitter, 1889) - Caucasus region (including Armenia); Middle East (Turkey, Iran, Syria, Jordan)
  - Anthrenus miniatulus (Reitter, 1899) (junior synonym) – Turkey; Jordan; Syria
- Anthrenus goliath (Saulcy in Mulsant & Rey, 1868) - North Africa (Algeria, Egypt, Morocco, Tunisia). Possibly in Libya and Syria
- Anthrenus hoberlandti (Kadej, Háva & Kalík, 2007) – Iran
- Anthrenus indicus (Kadej, Háva & Kalík, 2007) – India (Himachal Pradesh, Kashmir, Ladakh); Pakistan
- Anthrenus isabellinus (Küster, 1848) – France; Greece; Italy; Mallorca; Malta; Portugal, Spain; Algeria; Libya; Morocco; Tunisia; Israel. Introduced to United States (East)
- Anthrenus kafkai (Kadej & Háva, 2011) – Iran
- Anthrenus latefasciatus (Reitter, 1892) – Russia (South-West and Far East); China (North); Turkey; Afghanistan; Caucasus region; Iran; Mongolia; North Korea; Pakistan; Syria; Central Asia (Kazakhstan, Kyrgyzstan, Tajikistan, Turkmenistan, Uzbekistan)
- Anthrenus mesopotamicus (Háva, 2001) – Iran; Iraq; Syria
- Anthrenus mroczkowskii (Kalík, 1954) – Albania; Bosnia and Herzegovina; Bulgaria; Corsica; Crete; Croatia; Greece; Italy; Macedonia; Slovenia; Turkey; Lebanon
- Anthrenus munroi (Hinton, 1943) – Bulgaria; Corsica; Cyprus; France; Greece; Italy; Macedonia; Portugal; Sardinia; Spain; Turkey; Ukraine (Crimea); Algeria; Libya; Morocco; Tunisia; Israel; Jordan; Lebanon; Syria
- Anthrenus nipponensis (Kalík & Ohbayashi, 1985) – Northern China and bordering territories in Russia; Japan; North Korea;
- Anthrenus oceanicus (Fauvel, 1903) – China (Guangdong, Jiangsu); India (Andhra Pradesh, Tamil Nadu); Indonesia (Java, Madura); Malaysia; Pakistan; Singapore; Sri Lanka; Taiwan; Australia; Cook Islands; French Polynesia (Tahiti); New Caledonia; Papua New Guinea, United States (Hawaiian Islands). Introduced to parts of Europe and Africa: Czech Republic; United Kingdom; Malta; Egypt; Congo; Mauritius; Nigeria; Reunion; Tanzania
- Anthrenus pfefferi (Kalík, 1954) – Croatia; Greece (with Crete); Italy
- Anthrenus pimpinellae (Fabricius, 1775) - Europe (from France to Southwest Russia). The species is still noted in other parts of the world: Asia, North Africa, Australia, United States. However, these additional records are disputed and do not provide reliable information on the distribution of the species, as they come from historical misidentification of related species within the complex, rather than accurate records of A. pimpinellae
- Anthrenus similaris (Kadej, Háva & Kalík, 2007) – Iran; Turkmenistan
- Anthrenus smetanai (Kadej & Háva, 2011) – Algeria; Morocco; Tunisia
- Anthrenus warchalowskii (Kadej, Háva & Kalík, 2007) – Iran
- Anthrenus chikatunovi (Holloway, 2020) – Southern France, Spain
- Anthrenus bakaloudisi (Holloway, Thanasoulias & Herrmann, 2024) – Greece (Macedonia)
- Anthrenus muehlei (Holloway & Herrmann, 2024) – Iran

=== Species group "scrophulariae" ===
- Anthrenus bilyi (Háva, 2000) – Armenia; Kyrgyzstan; Uzbekistan
- Anthrenus chiton (Beal, 1998) – United States (Arizona, California, Colorado, Texas)
- Anthrenus ethiopicus (Háva, 2004) – Ethiopia; Kenya; South Africa
- Anthrenus fucosus (Beal, 1998) – United States (Arizona)
- Anthrenus kenyaensis (Háva, 2004) – Kenya; Namibia; Tanzania, Zimbabwe; South Africa (Transvaal);
- Anthrenus lepidus (LeConte, 1854) – Canada (British Columbia); Mexico (Baja California); United States
- Anthrenus miniopictus (Bedel, 1884) – Spain; Algeria; Morocco; Tunisia
- Anthrenus picturatus
  - Anthrenus picturatus picturatus (Solsky, 1876) – Azerbaijan, Belarus, Georgia, Poland, Romania, Slovakia, Turkey; Afghanistan, Caucasus region, Iran, Kyrgyzstan, Kazakhstan, Russia, Tajikistan, Turkmenistan, Uzbekistan. Introduced to Corsica and South Africa (Pretoria)
  - Anthrenus picturatus arabicus (Háva & Herrmann, 2006) – Yemen
  - Anthrenus picturatus hintoni (Mroczkowski, 1952) – China (Beijing, Fujian, Inner Mongolia, Hebei, Hunan, Jiangxi, Liaoning, Qinghai, Shaanxi, Shangdong, Sichuan, Xinjiang); Mongolia; Russia (Stavropol)
  - Anthrenus picturatus melanoleucus (Solsky, 1876) – Afghanistan, Kazakhstan, Kyrgyzstan, Tajikistan, Uzbekistan
- Anthrenus scrophulariae
  - Anthrenus scrophulariae scrophulariae (Linnaeus, 1758) – Europe, Asia, North America, Africa (Northern). Introduced to Australia (including Tasmania) and Chile.
  - Anthrenus scrophulariae albidus (Brullé, 1832) – Southeast Europe, Turkey, Caucasus region, Syria, Uzbekistan
- Anthrenus sophonisba (Beal, 1998) – United States (Arizona, California, Idaho, Nevada, Utah)
- Anthrenus thoracicus (Melsheimer, 1844) – United States (Arkansas, Illinois, Minnesota, Mississippi, Missouri, Montana, Oklahoma, Pennsylvania, South Carolina, Texas)

=== Species group "seminulum" ===
- Anthrenus seminulum (Arrow, 1915) – Kenya; South Africa
- Anthrenus tarnawskii (Kadej & Háva, 2006) – Botswana; Namibia; Zimbabwe; South Africa (Transvaal)

=== Other (no grouping) ===
- Anthrenus pacificus (Fairmaire, 1850) – French Polynesia (Tahiti)
- Anthrenus sparsutus (Fairmaire, 1850) – French Polynesia (Tahiti)
- Anthrenus semipallens (Holloway & Herrmann, 2023) – Spain
- Anthrenus mumbaiensis (Holloway, 2023) – India
