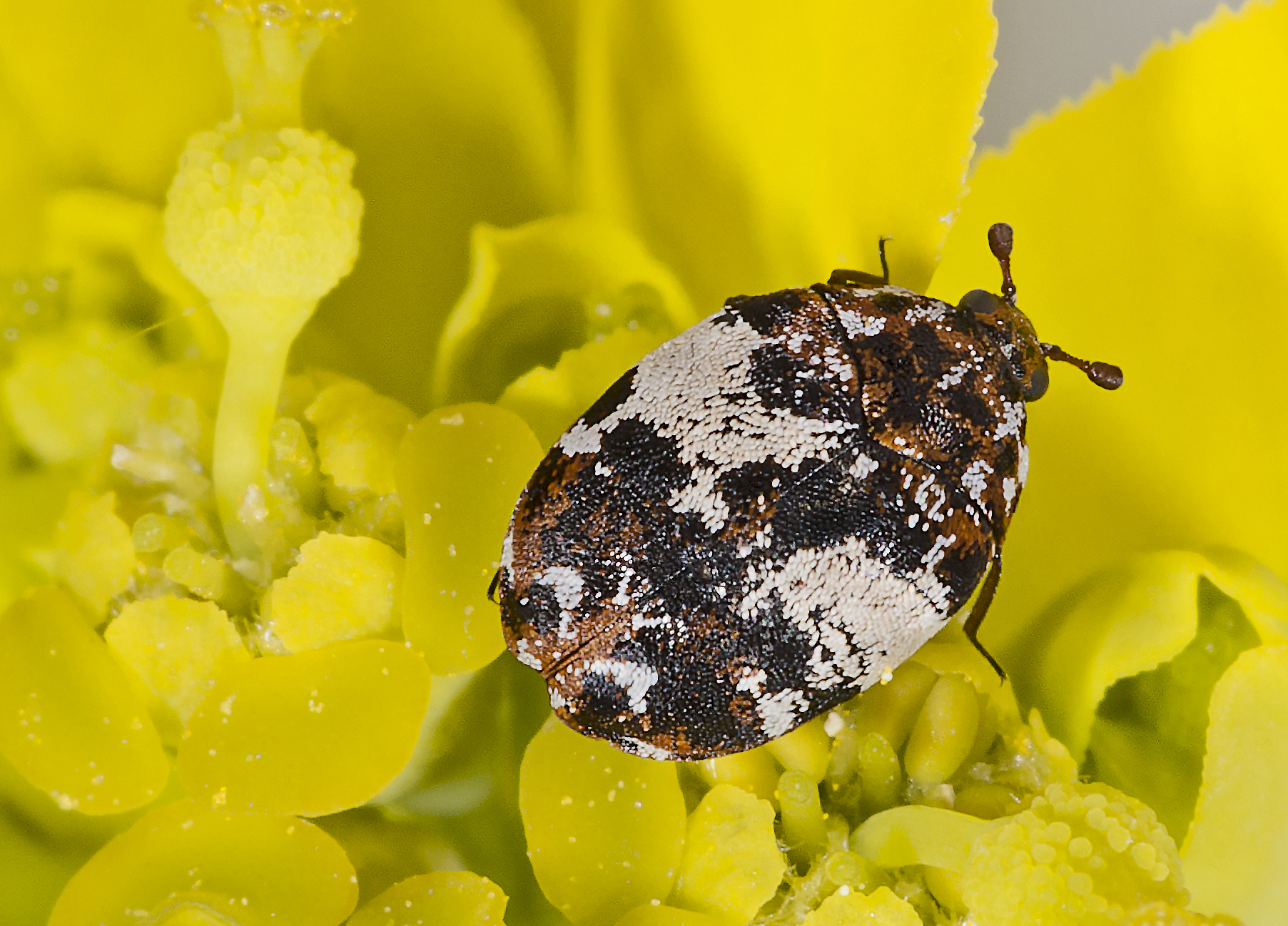

Scientific classification
- Kingdom: Animalia
- Phylum: Arthropoda
- Clade: Pancrustacea
- Class: Insecta
- Order: Coleoptera
- Suborder: Polyphaga
- Family: Dermestidae
- Genus: Anthrenus
- Subgenus: Anthrenus
- Species: A. pimpinellae

Binomial name
- Anthrenus pimpinellae Fabricius, 1775

Synonyms
- Byrrhus pimpinellae (Fabricius, 1775)

= Anthrenus pimpinellae =

Species of beetle

Anthrenus pimpinellae is a species group of beetle found natively in Europe, northern Africa, Asia and portions of the Oriental region; it has also been introduced to parts of North America. Former studies on Nearctic and Palearctic Anthrenus, authors distinguished three informal groups, lepidus, pimpinellae and schropuslariae holding different beetle taxa. This was made on the base of the dorsal patterns.

== Description ==
Size of about 3–4 mm. Elytra black with white and brown scales.

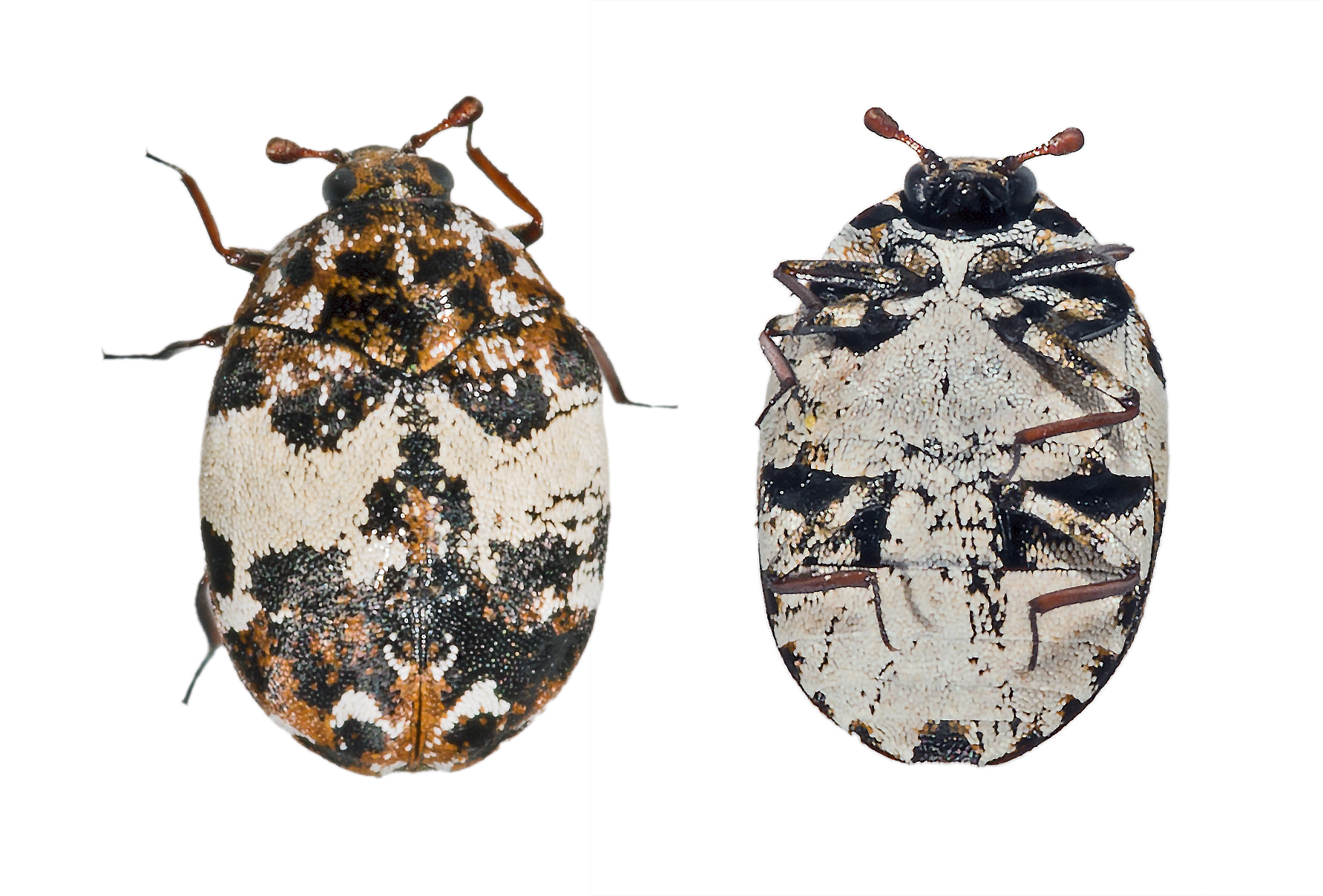
Both sides

== See also ==
- Anthrenus pimpinellae complex
- Anthrenus isabellinus
- Anthrenus delicatus
