= Anthrenus miniopictus =

Scientific classification
- Kingdom: Animalia
- Phylum: Arthropoda
- Class: Insecta
- Order: Coleoptera
- Suborder: Polyphaga
- Family: Dermestidae
- Genus: Anthrenus
- Subgenus: Anthrenus
- Species: A. miniopictus

Binomial name
- Anthrenus miniopictus Bedel, 1884

Species of beetle

Anthrenus miniopictus is a species of carpet beetle in the family Dermestidae. It is known from Spain, Algeria, Morocco, and Tunisia.

== See also ==
- Anthrenus scrophulariae species group

Similar species:

- Anthrenus scrophulariae, cosmopolitan
- Possibly Anthrenus angustefasciatus, known from Europe
