= Anthrenus sparsutus =

Scientific classification
- Kingdom: Animalia
- Phylum: Arthropoda
- Class: Insecta
- Order: Coleoptera
- Suborder: Polyphaga
- Family: Dermestidae
- Genus: Anthrenus
- Subgenus: Anthrenus
- Species: A. sparsutus

Binomial name
- Anthrenus sparsutus Fairmaire, 1850

Species of beetle

Anthrenus (Anthrenus) sparsutus is a species of carpet beetle found in French Polynesia (Tahiti).

== See also ==
Anthrenus species present in French Polynesia:

- Anthrenus pacificus
- Anthrenus oceanicus
