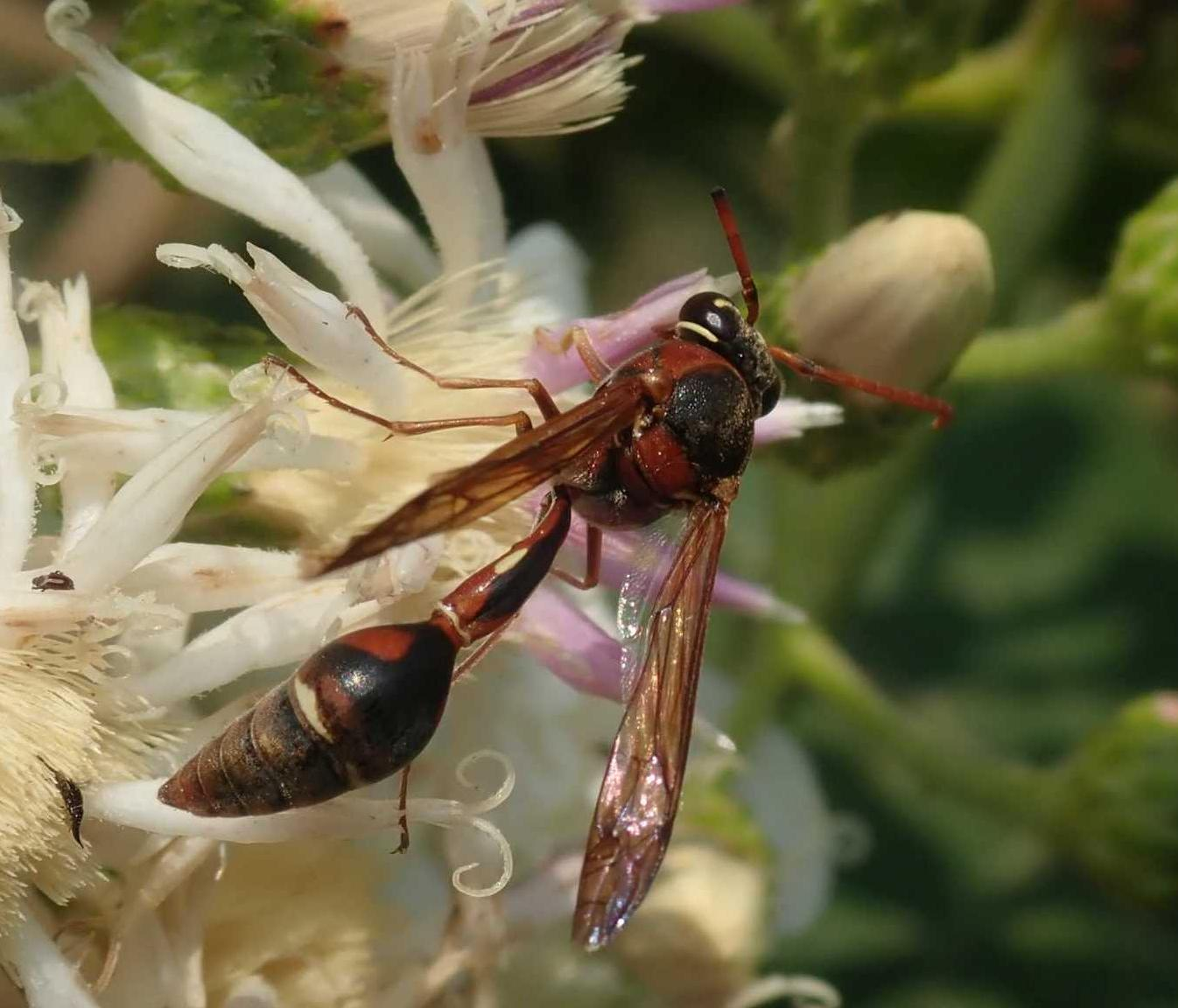
- Afreumenes aethiopicus

Scientific classification
- Domain: Eukaryota
- Kingdom: Animalia
- Phylum: Arthropoda
- Class: Insecta
- Order: Hymenoptera
- Family: Vespidae
- Subfamily: Eumeninae
- Genus: Afreumenes; Bequaert, 1926

Species
- Afreumenes aethiopicus; Afreumenes aterrimus; Afreumenes erythrosoma; Afreumenes melanosoma; Afreumenes moseri; Afreumenes nigrorufus; Afreumenes violaceus

= Afreumenes =

Genus of wasps

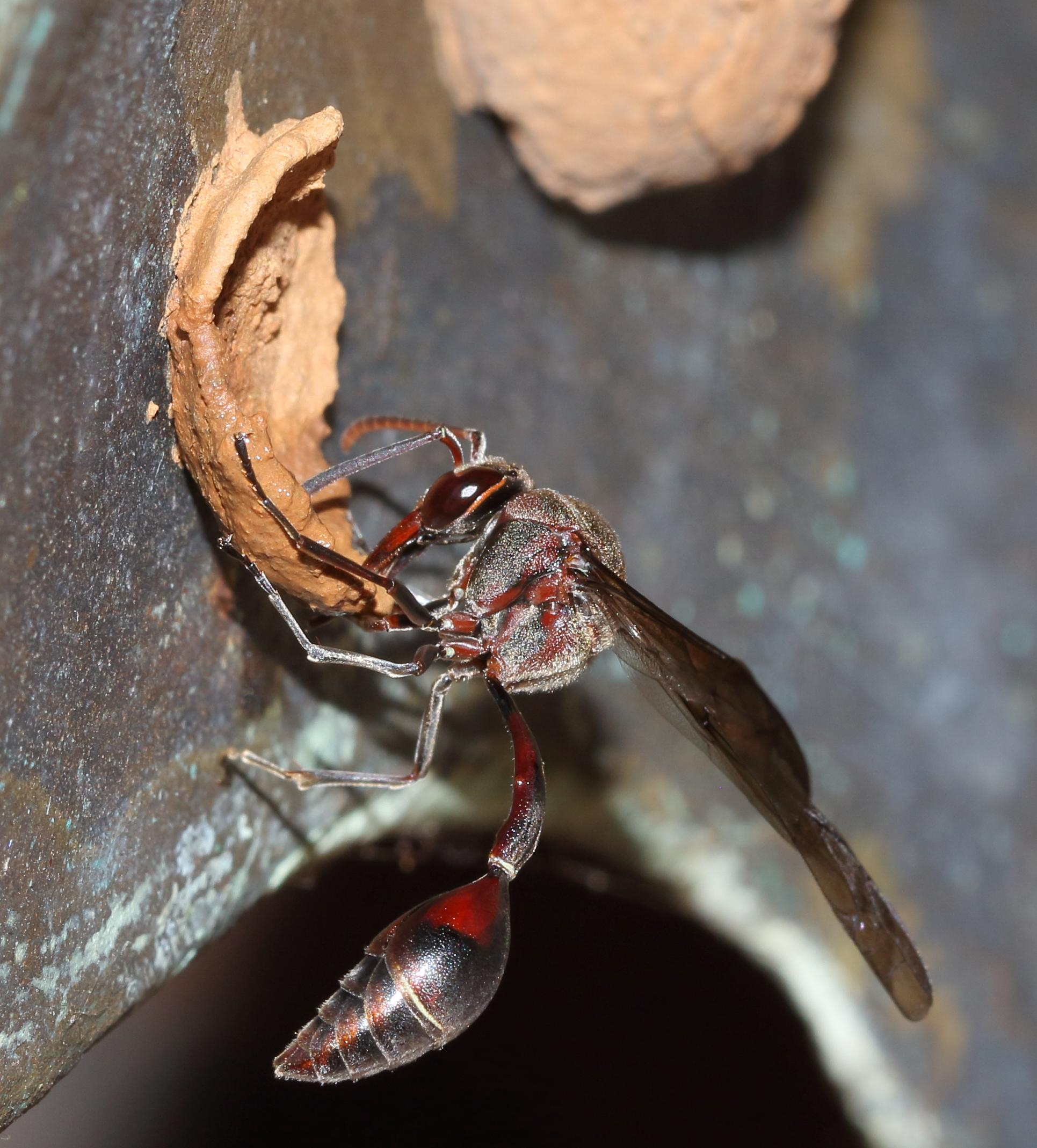
An Afreumenes potter wasp building a nest

Afreumenes is an Afrotropical genus of potter wasps.

== Taxonomy and distribution ==
Species and subspecies:

- Afreumenes aethiopicus
  - Afreumenes aethiopicus aethiopicus (de Saussure, 1852) - Benin, Burkina Faso, Cameroon, Central African Republic, Democratic Republic of Congo, Gabon, Gambia, Ghana, Guinea Bissau, Ivory Coast, Kenya, Liberia, Mali, Niger, Nigeria, Senegal, Sierra Leone, South Africa, Tanzania, Togo, Uganda, Zambia
  - Afreumenes aethiopicus affinis (von Schulthess, Rechberg, 1910) - Angola, Ethiopia, Kenya, Tanzania
  - Afreumenes aethiopicus longirostris (Gerstäcker,1857) - Angola, Democratic Republic of Congo, Eritrea, Ethiopia, Kenya, Malawi, Mozambique, South Africa, Tanzania, Yemen, Zambia, Zimbabwe
  - Afreumenes aethiopicus longitudinalis Giordani Soika, 1968 - Malawi, South Africa, Zimbabwe
- Afreumenes aterrimus
  - Afreumenes aterrimus aterrimus (von Schulthess, Rechberg, 1910) - Cameroon, Democratic Republic of Congo, Kenya, Malawi, Nigeria, Tanzania, Togo, Uganda, Zimbabwe
  - Afreumenes aterrimus bicoloratus Giordani Soika, 1987 - Kenya
  - Afreumenes aterrimus pseudomelanosoma Giordani Soika, 1968 - Democratic Republic of Congo, Tanzania, Uganda, Zambia
- Afreumenes erythrosoma (Giordani Soika, 1940) - Democratic Republic of Congo, Ethiopia, Kenya, Rwanda, Uganda, Zambia
- Afreumenes melanosoma
  - Afreumenes melanosoma melanosoma (de Saussure, 1852) - Cameroon, Central African Republic, Democratic Republic of Congo, Equatorial Guinea, Ethiopia, Equatorial Guinea (Bioko), Gabon, Gambia, Ghana, Guinea, Ivory Coast, Kenya, Senegal, Sierra Leone, South Africa, Uganda
  - Afreumenes melanosoma ealensis Giordani Soika, 1968 - Democratic Republic of Congo
- Afreumenes moseri
  - Afreumenes moseri moseri (Schulz, 1906) - Cameroon, Democratic Republic of Congo, Equatorial Guinea (Bioko), Togo, Uganda
  - Afreumenes moseri bimidiatus Giordani Soika, 1968 (Democratic Republic of Congo
- Afreumenes nigrorufus Giordani Soika, 1968 - Kenya, Malawi, Tanzania, Yemen, Zambia
- Afreumenes violaceus
  - Afreumenes violaceus violaceus (Giordani Soika, 1941) - Democratic Republic of Congo, Ethiopia, Kenya, Malawi, Mozambique, South Africa, Tanzania, Zimbabwe
  - Afreumenes violaceus paramelanosoma Giordani Soika, 1968 - Democratic Republic of Congo, Equatorial Guinea (Bioko), Gabon, Uganda
  - Afreumenes violaceus rugosopunctatus Giordani Soika, 1968 - Democratic Republic of Congo, Kenya, Malawi, Uganda, Zimbabwe
  - Afreumenes violaceus trifasciatus Giordani Soika, 1987 - South Africa
