= Anthrenus pueblanus =

Scientific classification
- Kingdom: Animalia
- Phylum: Arthropoda
- Class: Insecta
- Order: Coleoptera
- Suborder: Polyphaga
- Family: Dermestidae
- Genus: Anthrenus
- Subgenus: Anthrenus
- Species: A. pueblanus

Binomial name
- Anthrenus pueblanus Háva, 2021

Species of beetle

Anthrenus (Anthrenus) pueblanus is a species of carpet beetle found in Puebla, Mexico.
