= Anthrenus lopatini =

Scientific classification
- Kingdom: Animalia
- Phylum: Arthropoda
- Class: Insecta
- Order: Coleoptera
- Suborder: Polyphaga
- Family: Dermestidae
- Genus: Anthrenus
- Subgenus: Anthrenus
- Species: A. lopatini

Binomial name
- Anthrenus lopatini Zhantiev, 1976

Species of beetle

Anthrenus (Anthrenus) lopatini is a species of carpet beetle found in Pakistan, Tajikistan, and Turkmenistan.
