= Afreumenes nigrorufus =

Scientific classification
- Domain: Eukaryota
- Kingdom: Animalia
- Phylum: Arthropoda
- Class: Insecta
- Order: Hymenoptera
- Family: Vespidae
- Genus: Afreumenes
- Species: A. nigrorufus

Binomial name
- Afreumenes nigrorufus Giordani Soika, 1968

Species of wasp

Afreumenes nigrorufus is a species of wasp in the family Vespidae. It was described by Giordani Soika in 1968.
