= Afreumenes erythrosoma =

Scientific classification
- Domain: Eukaryota
- Kingdom: Animalia
- Phylum: Arthropoda
- Class: Insecta
- Order: Hymenoptera
- Family: Vespidae
- Genus: Afreumenes
- Species: A. erythrosoma

Binomial name
- Afreumenes erythrosoma (Giordani Soika, 1940)

Species of wasp

Afreumenes erythrosoma is a species of wasp in the family Vespidae. It was described by Giordani Soika in 1940.
