= Anthrenus klichai =

Scientific classification
- Kingdom: Animalia
- Phylum: Arthropoda
- Clade: Pancrustacea
- Class: Insecta
- Order: Coleoptera
- Suborder: Polyphaga
- Family: Dermestidae
- Genus: Anthrenus
- Subgenus: Anthrenus
- Species: A. klichai

Binomial name
- Anthrenus klichai Herrmann, Kadej & Háva, 2016

Species of beetle

Anthrenus (Anthrenus) klichai is a species of carpet beetle found in Zambia.
