= Anthrenus paulyi =

Scientific classification
- Kingdom: Animalia
- Phylum: Arthropoda
- Class: Insecta
- Order: Coleoptera
- Suborder: Polyphaga
- Family: Dermestidae
- Genus: Anthrenus
- Subgenus: Anthrenus
- Species: A. paulyi

Binomial name
- Anthrenus paulyi Háva, 2003

Species of beetle

Anthrenus (Anthrenus) paulyi is a species of carpet beetle found in West Africa (Burkina Faso and Ivory Coast).
