= Anthrenus simonis =

Scientific classification
- Kingdom: Animalia
- Phylum: Arthropoda
- Class: Insecta
- Order: Coleoptera
- Suborder: Polyphaga
- Family: Dermestidae
- Genus: Anthrenus
- Subgenus: Anthrenus
- Species: A. simonis

Binomial name
- Anthrenus simonis Reitter, 1881

Species of beetle

Anthrenus (Anthrenus) simonis is a species of carpet beetle found in Turkey, Egypt, Libya, Tunisia, Iran, Iraq, Israel, and Syria.
