= Anthrenus kaliki =

Scientific classification
- Kingdom: Animalia
- Phylum: Arthropoda
- Class: Insecta
- Order: Coleoptera
- Suborder: Polyphaga
- Family: Dermestidae
- Genus: Anthrenus
- Subgenus: Anthrenus
- Species: A. kaliki

Binomial name
- Anthrenus kaliki Pic, 1952

Species of beetle

Anthrenus (Anthrenus) kaliki is a species of carpet beetle found in Algeria.
