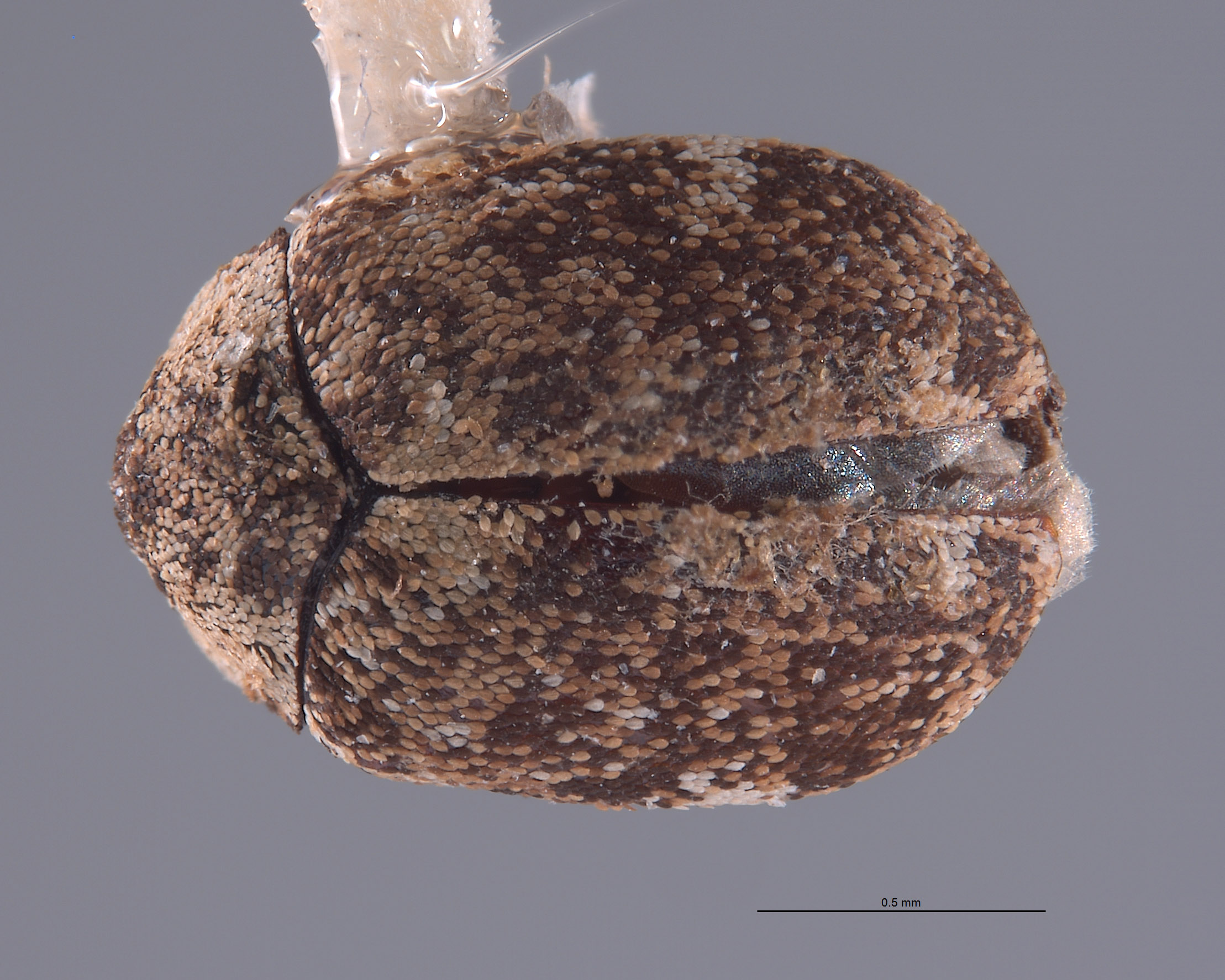
- Dorsal view
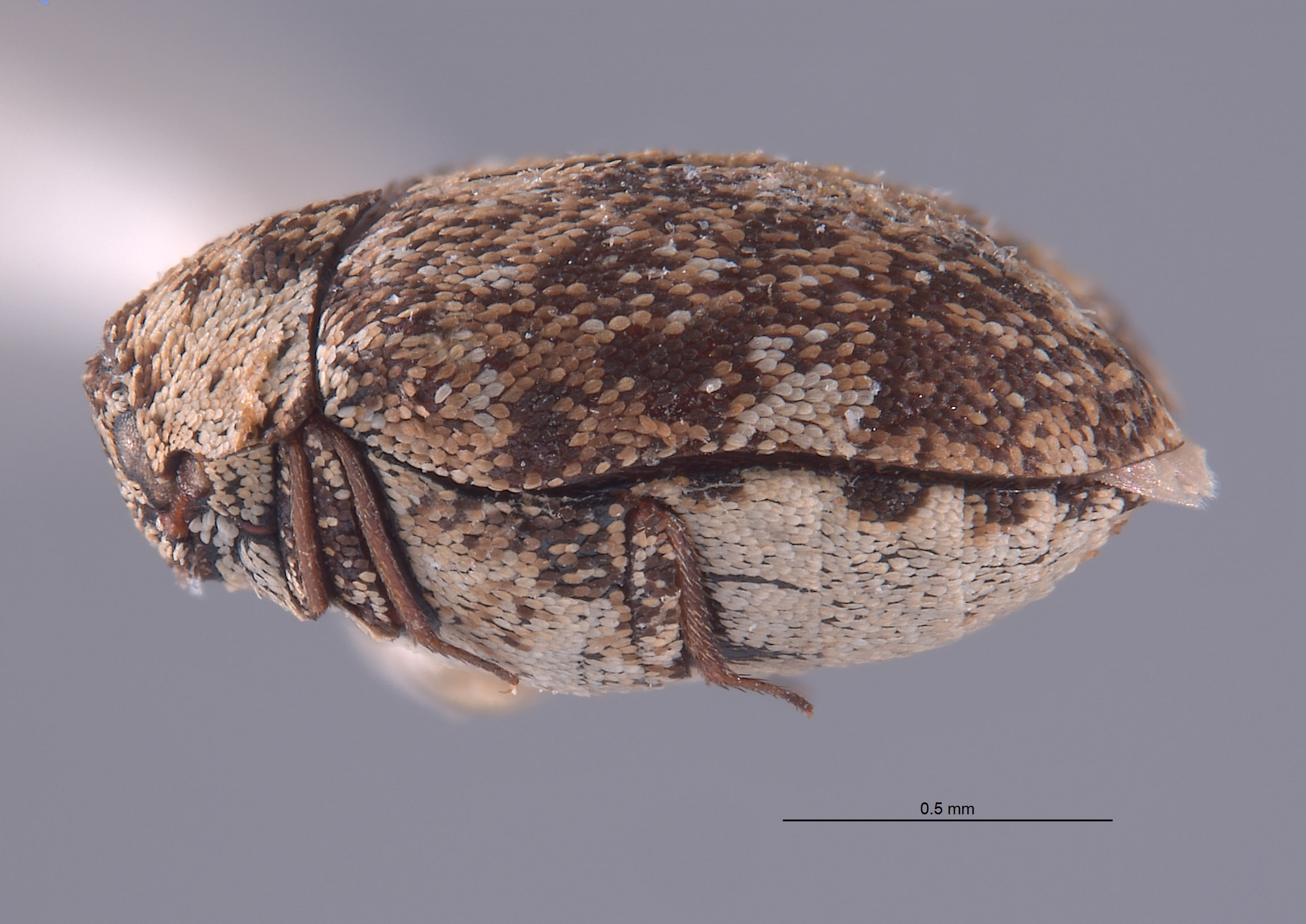
- Side view

Scientific classification
- Kingdom: Animalia
- Phylum: Arthropoda
- Class: Insecta
- Order: Coleoptera
- Suborder: Polyphaga
- Family: Dermestidae
- Genus: Anthrenus
- Subgenus: Anthrenus
- Species: A. fucosus

Binomial name
- Anthrenus fucosus Beal, 1998

= Anthrenus fucosus =

Species of beetle

Anthrenus fucosus is a species of carpet beetle in the family Dermestidae present in United States (in the state of Arizona).

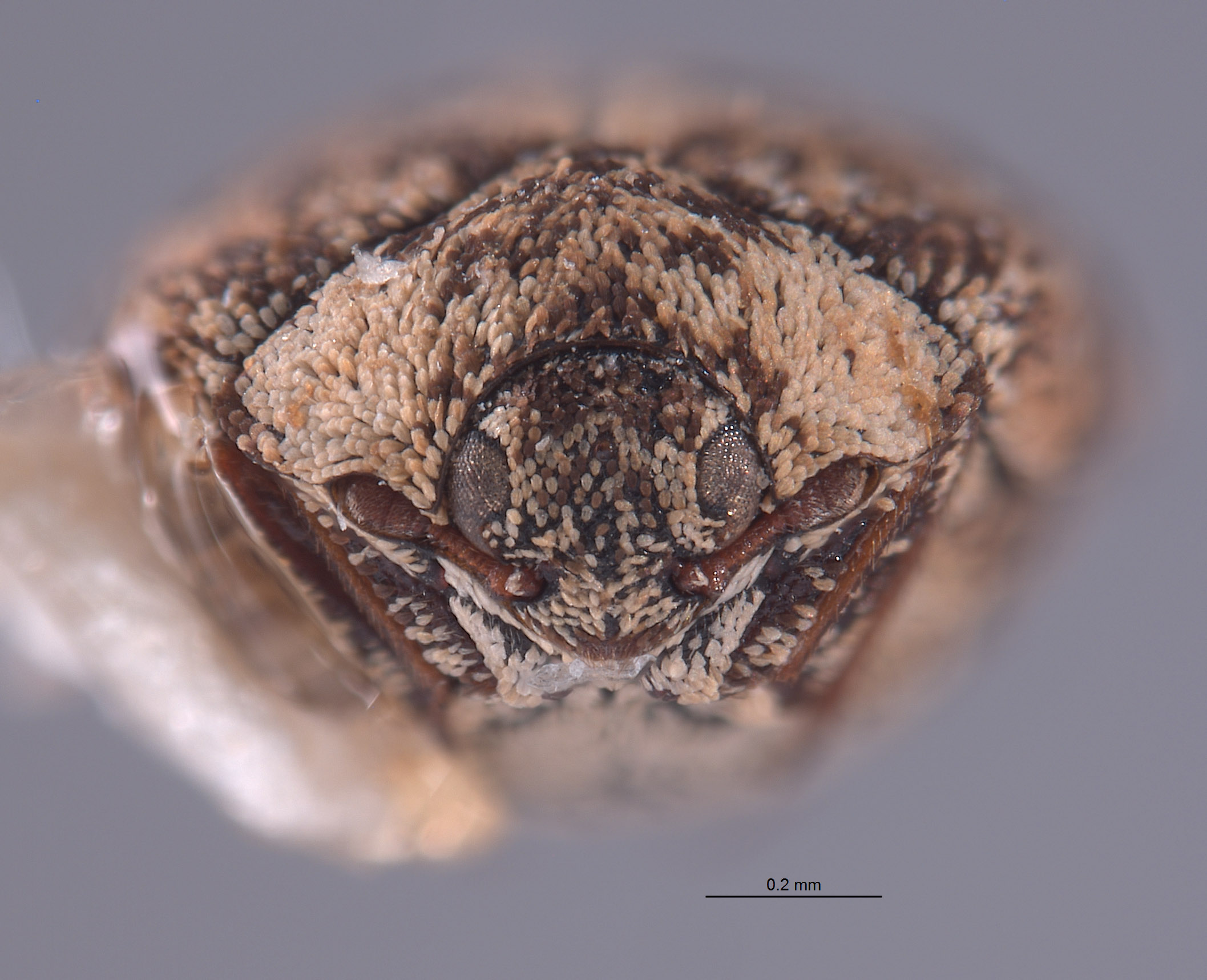
Adult A. fucosus. Head view
