= Anthrenus maculatus =

Scientific classification
- Kingdom: Animalia
- Phylum: Arthropoda
- Clade: Pancrustacea
- Class: Insecta
- Order: Coleoptera
- Suborder: Polyphaga
- Family: Dermestidae
- Tribe: Anthrenini
- Genus: Anthrenus
- Species: A. maculatus

Binomial name
- Anthrenus maculatus Fabricius, 1798

Synonyms
- Anthrenus parvus Casey, 1900

Species of beetle

Anthrenus maculatus is a species of carpet beetle in the family Dermestidae. It is found in North America.

== See also ==
- Anthrenus maculatus species group

Similar species:

- Anthrenus pulaskii, present on the east of United States
- Anthrenus omoi, present in North America
