= Anthrenus cornelli =

Scientific classification
- Kingdom: Animalia
- Phylum: Arthropoda
- Class: Insecta
- Order: Coleoptera
- Suborder: Polyphaga
- Family: Dermestidae
- Genus: Anthrenus
- Subgenus: Anthrenus
- Species: A. cornelli

Binomial name
- Anthrenus cornelli Háva & Herrmann, 2008

Species of beetle

Anthrenus (Anthrenus) cornelli is a species of carpet beetle found in Tanzania.
