= Afreumenes violaceus =

Scientific classification
- Domain: Eukaryota
- Kingdom: Animalia
- Phylum: Arthropoda
- Class: Insecta
- Order: Hymenoptera
- Family: Vespidae
- Genus: Afreumenes
- Species: A. violaceus

Binomial name
- Afreumenes violaceus (Giordani Soika, 1941)

Species of wasp

Afreumenes violaceus is a species of wasp in the family Vespidae. It was described by Giordani Soika in 1941.

== Subspecies ==
- Afreumenes violaceus violaceus (Giordani Soika, 1941)
- Afreumenes violaceus paramelanosoma Giordani Soika, 1968
- Afreumenes violaceus trifasciatus Giordani Soika, 1987
- Afreumenes violaceus rugosopunctatus Giordani Soika, 1968
