= Anthrenus bartolozzii =

Scientific classification
- Kingdom: Animalia
- Phylum: Arthropoda
- Class: Insecta
- Order: Coleoptera
- Suborder: Polyphaga
- Family: Dermestidae
- Genus: Anthrenus
- Subgenus: Anthrenus
- Species: A. bartolozzii

Binomial name
- Anthrenus bartolozzii Háva, 2003

Species of beetle

Anthrenus (Anthrenus) bartolozzii is a species of carpet beetle found in Ethiopia, Kenya, Malawi, and Tanzania.
