= Afreumenes melanosoma =

Scientific classification
- Domain: Eukaryota
- Kingdom: Animalia
- Phylum: Arthropoda
- Class: Insecta
- Order: Hymenoptera
- Family: Vespidae
- Genus: Afreumenes
- Species: A. melanosoma

Binomial name
- Afreumenes melanosoma (Saussure, 1852)

Synonyms
- Eumenes melanosoma Saussure, 1852; Eumenes sulcigastra Gribodo, 1884; Eumenes decipiens Kirby, 1896; Eumenes gracillima Tullgren, 1904; Eumenes melanosoma ealensis Giordani Soika 1968; Eumenes melanosoma yemenensis Giordani Soika 1996

Species of wasp

Afreumenes melanosoma is a species of wasp in the family Vespidae. It was described by Henri de Saussure in 1852.

== Subspecies ==
- Afreumenes melanosoma melanosoma (Saussure, 1852)
- Afreumenes melanosoma ealensis Giordani Soika, 1968
- Afreumenes melanosoma yemenensis Giordani Soika, 1996
