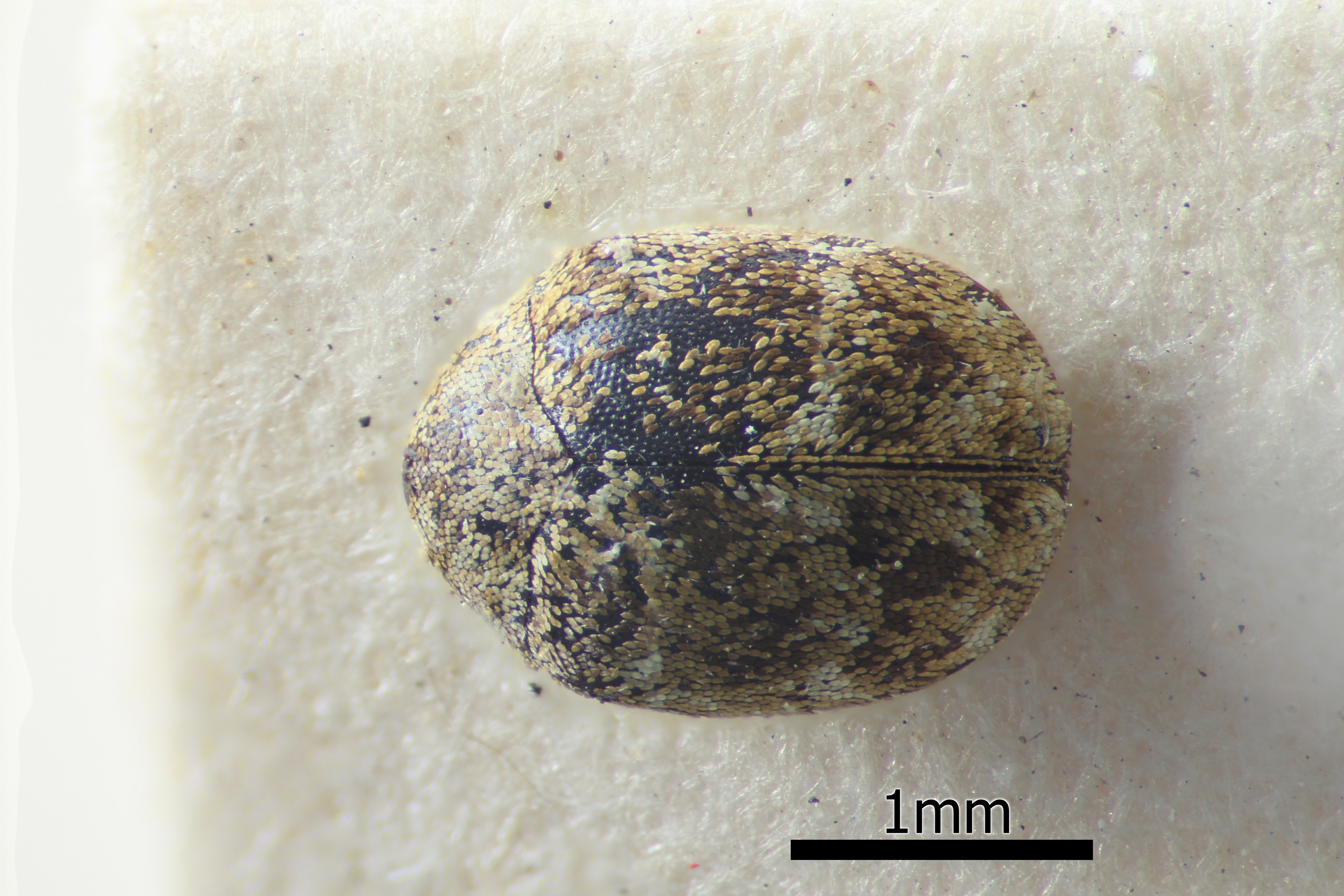

Scientific classification
- Kingdom: Animalia
- Phylum: Arthropoda
- Class: Insecta
- Order: Coleoptera
- Suborder: Polyphaga
- Family: Dermestidae
- Genus: Anthrenus
- Subgenus: Anthrenus
- Species: A. rauterbergi

Binomial name
- Anthrenus rauterbergi Reitter, 1908

= Anthrenus rauterbergi =

Species of beetle

Anthrenus rauterbergi is a species of carpet beetle in the family Dermestidae. It is known from Egypt.
