= Anthrenus ardoi =

Scientific classification
- Kingdom: Animalia
- Phylum: Arthropoda
- Clade: Pancrustacea
- Class: Insecta
- Order: Coleoptera
- Suborder: Polyphaga
- Family: Dermestidae
- Genus: Anthrenus
- Subgenus: Anthrenus
- Species: A. ardoi

Binomial name
- Anthrenus ardoi Kadej & Háva, 2011

Species of beetle

Anthrenus (Anthrenus) ardoi is a species of carpet beetle found in Oman, the United Arab Emirates and Yemen.

== Taxonomy ==
Marcin Kadej and Jiří Háva described the species in 2011. The male holotype was collected by Paul Ardö at Ghuzayn on the Al Khaburah–Ibri road, Oman, on 10 April 1985, and is held in the Lund University zoological collections (MZLU). The species is named after Ardö, who collected the type series.

== Description ==
The body is about 2.0 mm long, convex and rounded, with brown integument. The antennae have eleven antennomeres with a three-segmented club. Each elytron bears an oval white patch beside the suture at its base, followed by three irregularly interrupted white transverse patches. The pronotum has a mixture of light brown, dark brown and white scales. The tibiae lack spines.

It differs from A. cervenkai and A. coloratus (nine antennomeres) and from A. malkini (ten) by its eleven antennomeres. It resembles some forms of A. namibicus and A. flavipes.

== Distribution ==
It was first recorded in the United Arab Emirates from Wadi Heyl in 2010. It was later recorded in Yemen, near Sheikh Othman and 20 km south of Taiz.
