= Anthrenus katerinae =

Scientific classification
- Kingdom: Animalia
- Phylum: Arthropoda
- Clade: Pancrustacea
- Class: Insecta
- Order: Coleoptera
- Suborder: Polyphaga
- Family: Dermestidae
- Genus: Anthrenus
- Subgenus: Anthrenus
- Species: A. katerinae

Binomial name
- Anthrenus katerinae Háva & Kadej, 2006

Species of beetle

Anthrenus (Anthrenus) katerinae is a species of carpet beetle found in Angola and Namibia.
