= Anthrenus mroczkowskii =

Scientific classification
- Kingdom: Animalia
- Phylum: Arthropoda
- Class: Insecta
- Order: Coleoptera
- Suborder: Polyphaga
- Family: Dermestidae
- Genus: Anthrenus
- Subgenus: Anthrenus
- Species: A. mroczkowskii

Binomial name
- Anthrenus mroczkowskii Kalík, 1954

Species of beetle

Anthrenus mroczkowskii is a species of carpet beetle in the family Dermestidae. It is known from Albania, Bosnia and Herzegovina, Bulgaria, Corsica, Crete, Croatia, Greece, Italy, Macedonia, Slovenia, Turkey, and Lebanon.

== See also ==
- Anthrenus pimpinellae complex - complex of similar species
- Anthrenus pfefferi
