= Anthrenus pfefferi =

Scientific classification
- Kingdom: Animalia
- Phylum: Arthropoda
- Class: Insecta
- Order: Coleoptera
- Suborder: Polyphaga
- Family: Dermestidae
- Genus: Anthrenus
- Subgenus: Anthrenus
- Species: A. pfefferi

Binomial name
- Anthrenus pfefferi Kalík, 1954

Species of beetle

Anthrenus pfefferi is a species of carpet beetle in the family Dermestidae. It is known from Croatia, Greece (including Crete), and Italy.

== See also ==
- Anthrenus pimpinellae complex - complex of similar species
- Anthrenus mroczkowskii
