= Anthrenus tarnawskii =

Scientific classification
- Kingdom: Animalia
- Phylum: Arthropoda
- Class: Insecta
- Order: Coleoptera
- Suborder: Polyphaga
- Family: Dermestidae
- Genus: Anthrenus
- Subgenus: Anthrenus
- Species: A. tarnawskii

Binomial name
- Anthrenus tarnawskii Kadej & Háva, 2006

Species of beetle

Anthrenus (Anthrenus) tarnawskii is a species of carpet beetle found in Botswana, Namibia, Zimbabwe, and South Africa (Transvaal).
