= Afreumenes moseri =

Scientific classification
- Domain: Eukaryota
- Kingdom: Animalia
- Phylum: Arthropoda
- Class: Insecta
- Order: Hymenoptera
- Family: Vespidae
- Genus: Afreumenes
- Species: A. moseri

Binomial name
- Afreumenes moseri (Schulz, 1906)

Synonyms
- Eumenes moseri Schulz, 1906; Afreumenes moseri bidimidiatus Giordani Soika, 1968; Afreumenes moseri bimidiatus Carpenter et al. 2009 (Lapsus)

Species of wasp

Afreumenes moseri is a species of potter wasp in the family Vespidae. It was described by Schulz and 1906.

== Subspecies ==
- Afreumenes moseri moseri (Schulz, 1906)
- Afreumenes moseri bidimidiatus Giordani Soika, 1968
