= Anthrenus safad =

Scientific classification
- Kingdom: Animalia
- Phylum: Arthropoda
- Class: Insecta
- Order: Coleoptera
- Suborder: Polyphaga
- Family: Dermestidae
- Genus: Anthrenus
- Subgenus: Anthrenus
- Species: A. safad

Binomial name
- Anthrenus safad Háva, 2013

Species of beetle

Anthrenus (Anthrenus) safad is a species of carpet beetle found in the United Arab Emirates.
