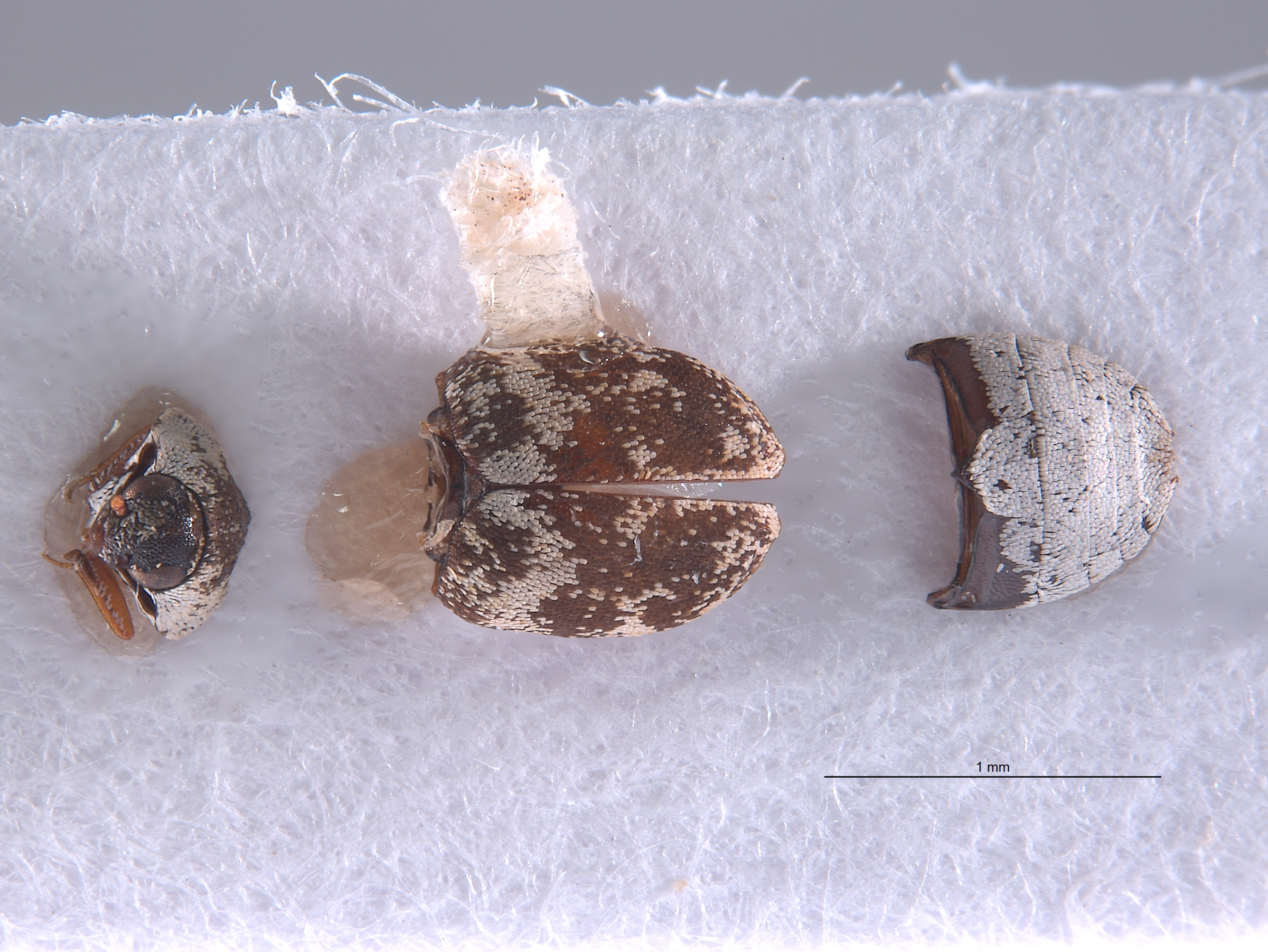
- Dorsal image
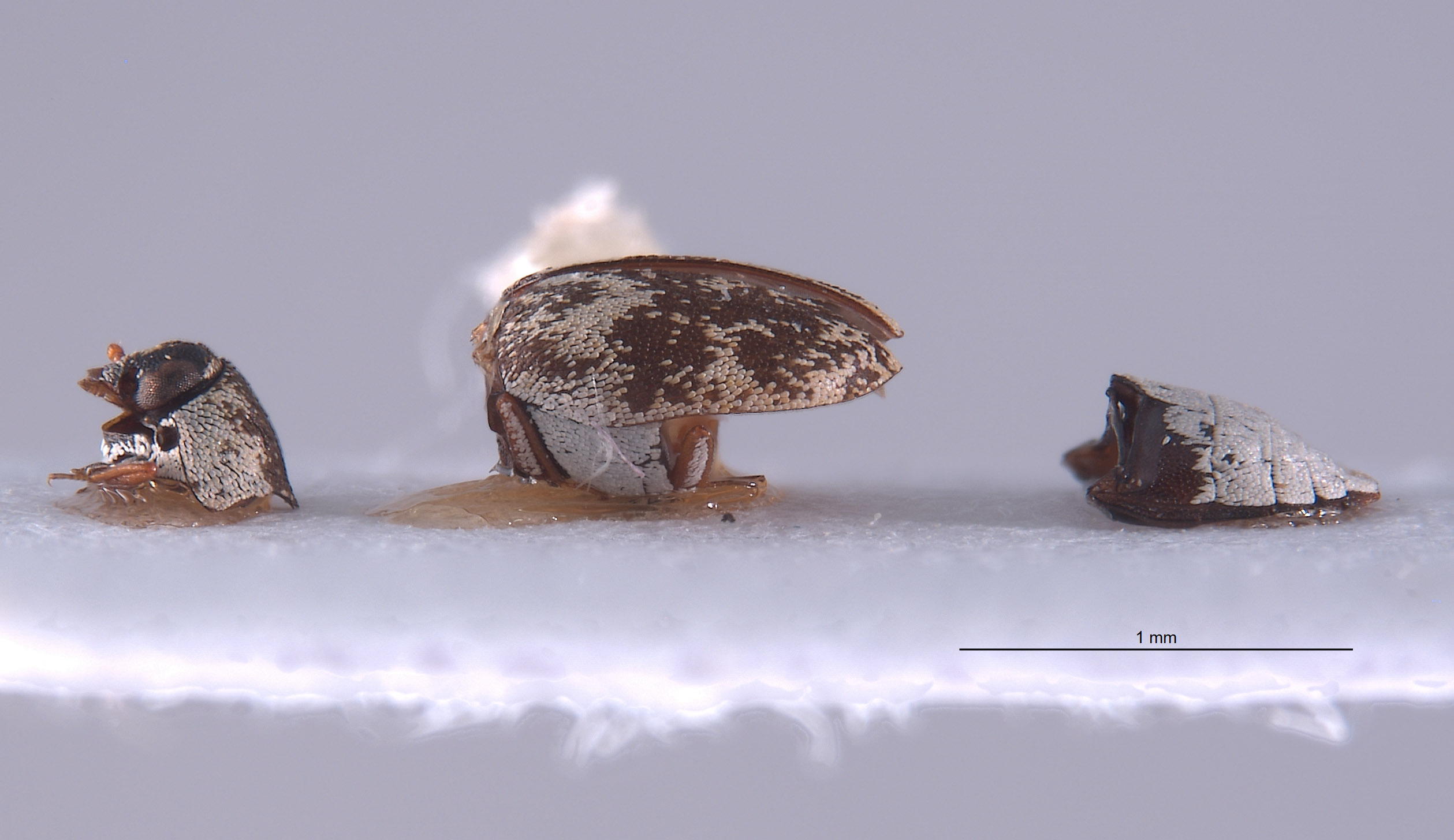
- Lateral image

Scientific classification
- Kingdom: Animalia
- Phylum: Arthropoda
- Class: Insecta
- Order: Coleoptera
- Suborder: Polyphaga
- Family: Dermestidae
- Genus: Anthrenus
- Subgenus: Anthrenus
- Species: A. pulaskii

Binomial name
- Anthrenus pulaskii Kadej, 2011

= Anthrenus pulaskii =

Species of beetle

Anthrenus pulaskii is a species of carpet beetle in the subgenus Anthrenus of the genus Anthrenus, family Dermestidae. It is known from the United States (California).

== See also ==
- Anthrenus maculatus species group

Similar species:

- Anthrenus maculatus, present on the east of United States
