= Anthrenus x-signum =

Scientific classification
- Kingdom: Animalia
- Phylum: Arthropoda
- Clade: Pancrustacea
- Class: Insecta
- Order: Coleoptera
- Suborder: Polyphaga
- Family: Dermestidae
- Genus: Anthrenus
- Subgenus: Anthrenus
- Species: A. x-signum

Binomial name
- Anthrenus x-signum Reitter, 1881

Species of beetle

Anthrenus (Anthrenus) x-signum is a species of carpet beetle found in Corsica (France), Algeria, Egypt, Eritrea, Libya, Morocco, Tunisia, Israel, and Jordan.
