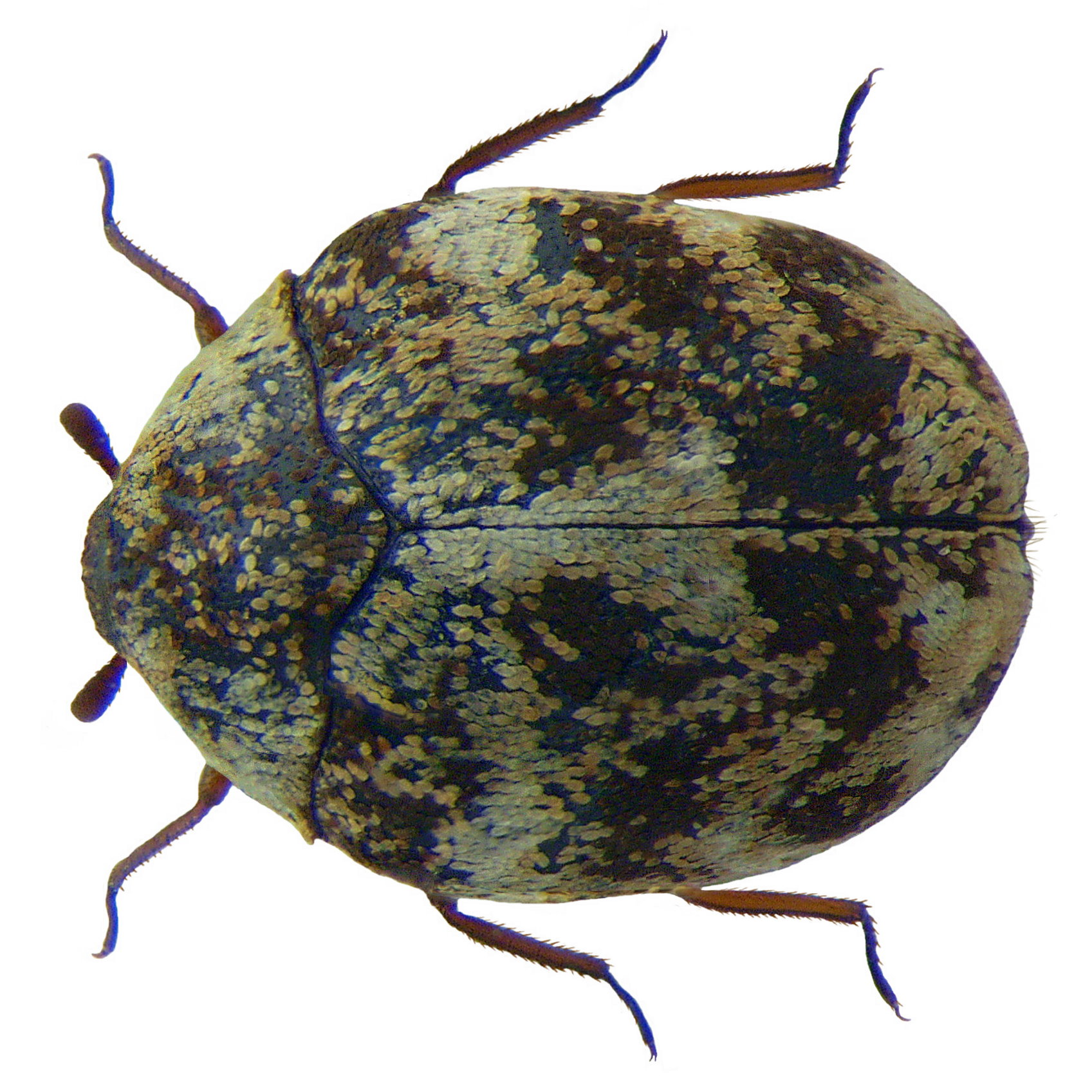

Scientific classification
- Kingdom: Animalia
- Phylum: Arthropoda
- Class: Insecta
- Order: Coleoptera
- Suborder: Polyphaga
- Family: Dermestidae
- Genus: Anthrenus
- Subgenus: Anthrenus
- Species: A. namibicus

Binomial name
- Anthrenus namibicus Háva, 2000

= Anthrenus namibicus =

Species of beetle

Anthrenus namibicus is a species of carpet beetle in the family Dermestidae. The species is only known from Namibia (Southern Africa).
