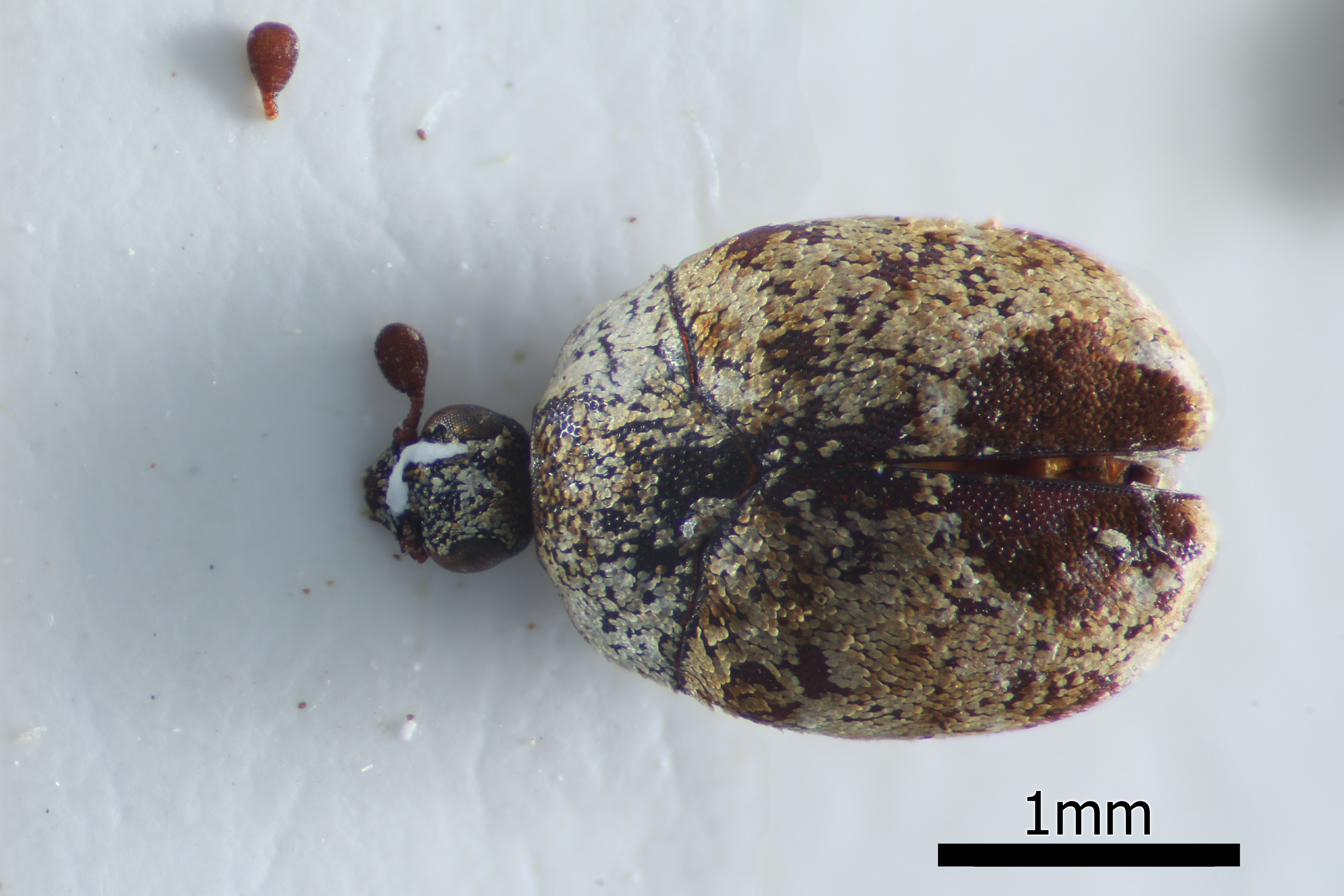

Scientific classification
- Kingdom: Animalia
- Phylum: Arthropoda
- Class: Insecta
- Order: Coleoptera
- Suborder: Polyphaga
- Family: Dermestidae
- Genus: Anthrenus
- Subgenus: Anthrenus
- Species: A. seminulum

Binomial name
- Anthrenus seminulum Arrow, 1915

= Anthrenus seminulum =

Species of beetle

Anthrenus seminulum is a species of carpet beetle in the family Dermestidae. It is known from Kenya and South Africa.
