= Anthrenus merkli =

Scientific classification
- Kingdom: Animalia
- Phylum: Arthropoda
- Class: Insecta
- Order: Coleoptera
- Suborder: Polyphaga
- Family: Dermestidae
- Genus: Anthrenus
- Subgenus: Anthrenus
- Species: A. merkli

Binomial name
- Anthrenus merkli Háva, 2003

Species of beetle

Anthrenus (Anthrenus) merkli is a species of carpet beetle found in Kenya, Somalia, and Tanzania.
