= Anthrenus rotundulus =

Scientific classification
- Kingdom: Animalia
- Phylum: Arthropoda
- Class: Insecta
- Order: Coleoptera
- Suborder: Polyphaga
- Family: Dermestidae
- Genus: Anthrenus
- Subgenus: Anthrenus
- Species: A. rotundulus

Binomial name
- Anthrenus rotundulus Reitter, 1889

Species of beetle

Anthrenus rotundulus is a species of carpet beetle in the family Dermestidae. It is known from Turkey, Egypt, Afghanistan, Caucasus region (Armenia included), Iran, Pakistan, and Turkmenistan.
