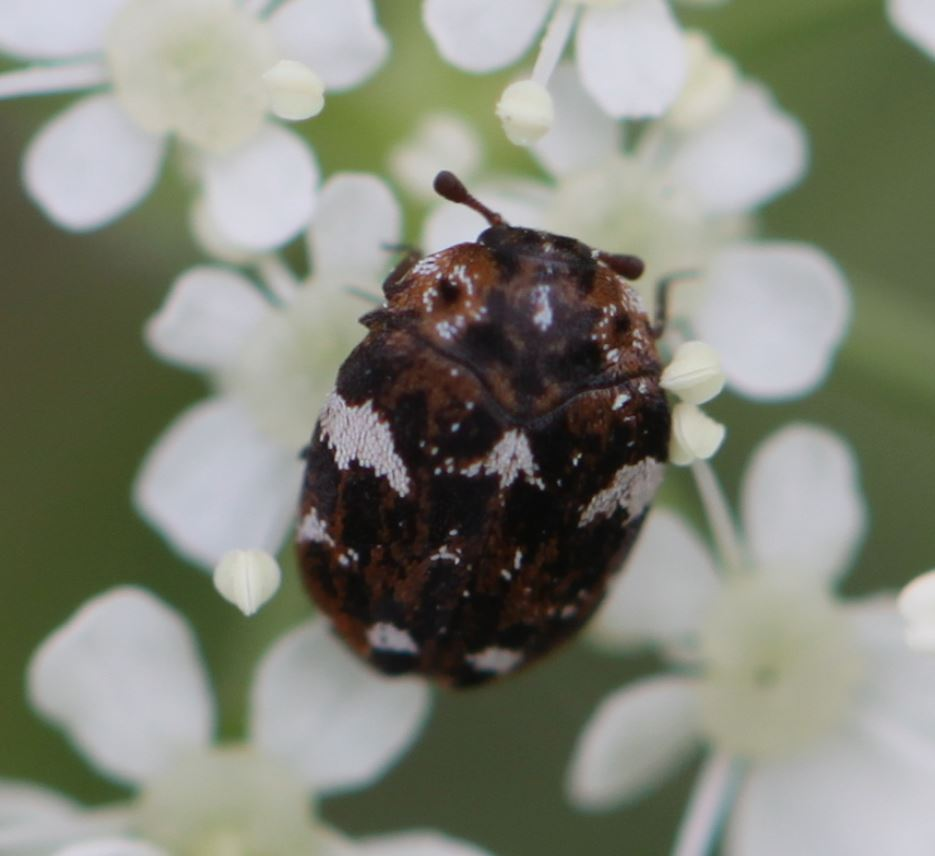

Scientific classification
- Kingdom: Animalia
- Phylum: Arthropoda
- Class: Insecta
- Order: Coleoptera
- Suborder: Polyphaga
- Family: Dermestidae
- Genus: Anthrenus
- Subgenus: Anthrenus
- Species: A. angustefasciatus

Binomial name
- Anthrenus angustefasciatus Ganglbauer, 1904

= Anthrenus angustefasciatus =

Species of beetle

Anthrenus angustefasciatus is a species of carpet beetle in the subgenus Anthrenus of the genus Anthrenus, family Dermestidae. It is known from Europe (Belgium, Bosnia and Herzegovina, Croatia, Czech Republic, United Kingdom, France, Germany, Italy, Monaco, Portugal, Serbia, Spain, Switzerland), Turkey, Algeria, Morocco, and Tunisia.

== See also ==
- Anthrenus festivus
- Anthrenus pimpinellae
