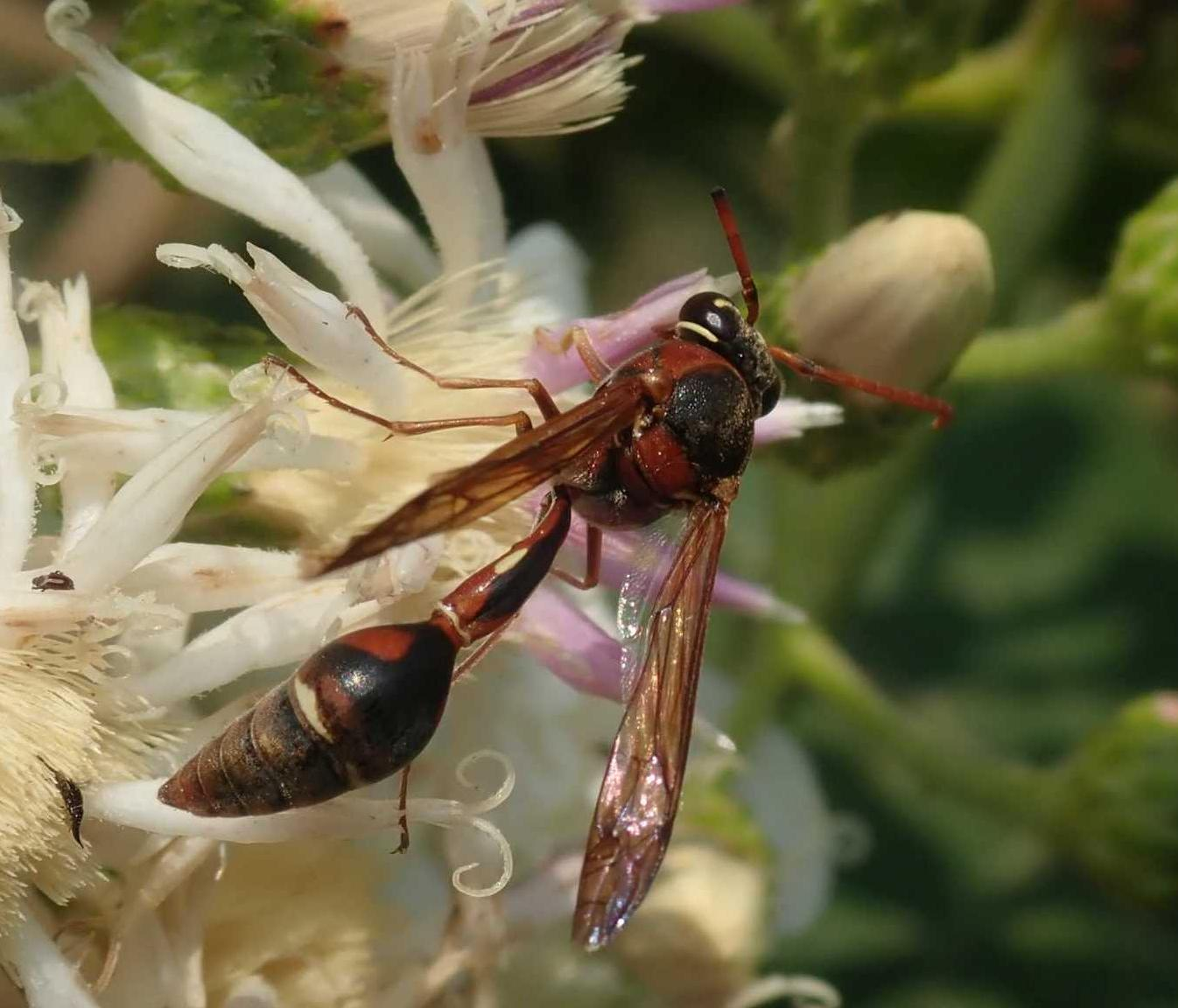

Scientific classification
- Domain: Eukaryota
- Kingdom: Animalia
- Phylum: Arthropoda
- Class: Insecta
- Order: Hymenoptera
- Family: Vespidae
- Genus: Afreumenes
- Species: A. aethiopicus

Binomial name
- Afreumenes aethiopicus (Saussure, 1852)

Synonyms
- Eumenes aethiopica Saussure, 1852; Eumenes distinctus Saussure, 1854 Syn.; Eumenes walkeri Ritsema, 1874 Syn.; Eumenes aethiopicus v. affinis Schulthess, 1910 Syn.; Eumenes xanthaspis Cameron, 1910 Syn.

= Afreumenes aethiopicus =

Species of wasp

Afreumenes aethiopicus is a species of potter wasp in the subfamily Eumeninae. It was described by Henri de Saussure in 1852.

== Subspecies ==
- Afreumenes aethiopicus affinis (Schulthess, 1910)
- Afreumenes aethiopicus aethiopicus (Saussure, 1852)
- Afreumenes aethiopicus longitudinalis Giordani Soika, 1968
- Afreumenes aethiopicus longirostris (Gerst., 1857)
