= Afreumenes aterrimus =

Scientific classification
- Domain: Eukaryota
- Kingdom: Animalia
- Phylum: Arthropoda
- Class: Insecta
- Order: Hymenoptera
- Family: Vespidae
- Genus: Afreumenes
- Species: A. aterrimus

Binomial name
- Afreumenes aterrimus (Schulthess, 1910)

Species of wasp

Afreumenes aterrimus is a species of wasp in the family Vespidae. It was described by Schulthess in 1910.

== Subspecies ==
- Afreumenes aterrimus bicoloratus Giordani Soika, 1987
- Afreumenes aterrimus aterrimus (Schulthess, 1910)
- Afreumenes aterrimus pseudomelanosoma Giordani Soika, 1968
