= Anthrenus crustaceus =

Scientific classification
- Kingdom: Animalia
- Phylum: Arthropoda
- Clade: Pancrustacea
- Class: Insecta
- Order: Coleoptera
- Suborder: Polyphaga
- Family: Dermestidae
- Genus: Anthrenus
- Subgenus: Anthrenus
- Species: A. crustaceus

Binomial name
- Anthrenus crustaceus Reitter, 1881

Species of beetle

Anthrenus (Anthrenus) crustaceus is a species of carpet beetle found in the Middle East (Turkey, Israel, Saudi Arabia, Syria, and Yemen), Africa (Egypt and Eritrea), and India (Gujarat).
