= Acteon aethiopicus =

Scientific classification
- Kingdom: Animalia
- Phylum: Mollusca
- Class: Gastropoda
- Superfamily: Acteonoidea
- Family: Acteonidae
- Genus: Acteon
- Species: A. aethiopicus

Binomial name
- Acteon aethiopicus E. von Martens, 1902

Synonyms
- Actaeon (Leucotina) aethiopicus E. von Martens, 1902 (basionym); Actaeon aethiopicus E. von Martens, 1902 (incorrect spelling of genus name)

Species of marine gastropod

Acteon aethiopicus is a species of sea snail, a marine gastropod mollusc in the family Acteonidae.

== Distribution ==
This marine species occurs in the Zanzibar Channel.
