= Anthrenus goliath =

Scientific classification
- Kingdom: Animalia
- Phylum: Arthropoda
- Class: Insecta
- Order: Coleoptera
- Suborder: Polyphaga
- Family: Dermestidae
- Genus: Anthrenus
- Subgenus: Anthrenus
- Species: A. goliath

Binomial name
- Anthrenus goliath Saulcy in Mulsant & Rey, 1867

Species of beetle

Anthrenus goliath is a species of carpet beetle in the family Dermestidae. It is known from North Africa, with confirmed records in Egypt. Possibly occurring in Algeria, Morocco, Tunisia, Libya, and Syria.
