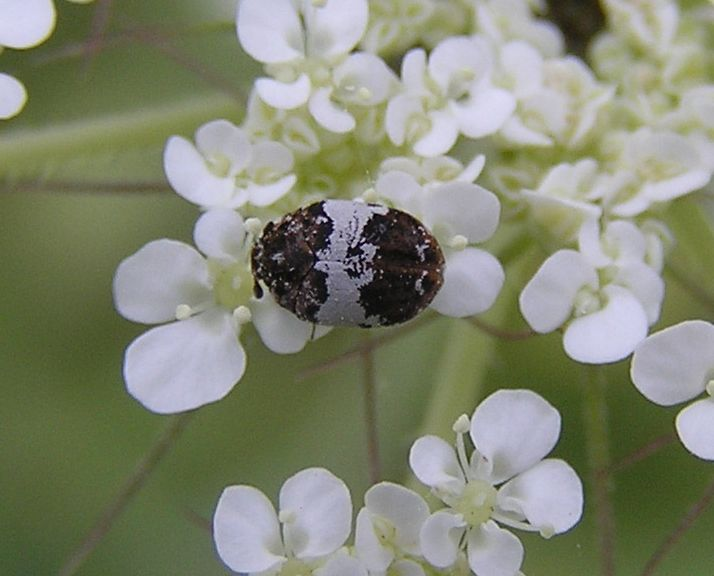

Scientific classification
- Kingdom: Animalia
- Phylum: Arthropoda
- Class: Insecta
- Order: Coleoptera
- Suborder: Polyphaga
- Family: Dermestidae
- Genus: Anthrenus
- Subgenus: Anthrenus
- Species: A. munroi

Binomial name
- Anthrenus munroi Hinton, 1943

= Anthrenus munroi =

Species of beetle

Anthrenus munroi is a species of beetle found in Europe, the Near East and North Africa. In Europe, it is known from Bulgaria, Corsica, mainland France, and Ukraine.
