= Anthrenus flavidulus =

Scientific classification
- Kingdom: Animalia
- Phylum: Arthropoda
- Class: Insecta
- Order: Coleoptera
- Suborder: Polyphaga
- Family: Dermestidae
- Genus: Anthrenus
- Subgenus: Anthrenus
- Species: A. flavidulus

Binomial name
- Anthrenus flavidulus Reitter, 1889

Synonyms
- Anthrenus miniatulus Reitter, 1899 (junior synonym)

Species of beetle

Anthrenus flavidulus is a species of carpet beetle in the family Dermestidae. It is known from the Caucasus region (including Armenia) and the Middle East (Turkey, Iran, Syria, Jordan).
