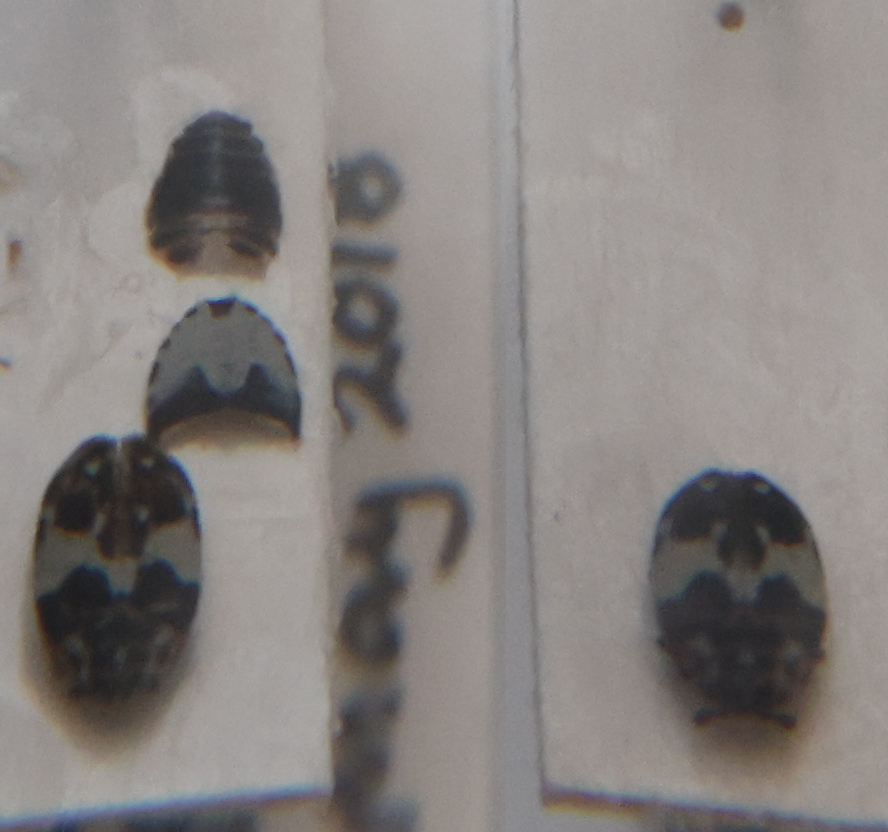

Scientific classification
- Kingdom: Animalia
- Phylum: Arthropoda
- Class: Insecta
- Order: Coleoptera
- Suborder: Polyphaga
- Family: Dermestidae
- Genus: Anthrenus
- Subgenus: Anthrenus
- Species: A. amandae

Binomial name
- Anthrenus amandae Holloway, 2019

= Anthrenus amandae =

Species of beetle

Anthrenus amandae is a species of carpet beetle in the family Dermestidae. It is known from Spain (Mallorca).
