= Anthrenus latefasciatus =

Scientific classification
- Kingdom: Animalia
- Phylum: Arthropoda
- Class: Insecta
- Order: Coleoptera
- Suborder: Polyphaga
- Family: Dermestidae
- Genus: Anthrenus
- Subgenus: Anthrenus
- Species: A. latefasciatus

Binomial name
- Anthrenus latefasciatus Reitter, 1892

Species of beetle

Anthrenus latefasciatus is a species of carpet beetle in the family Dermestidae. It is known from various regions including Russia (South-West and Far East), China (North), Turkey, Afghanistan, Caucasus region, Iran, Mongolia, North Korea, Pakistan, Syria, and Central Asia.

== See also ==
- Anthrenus pimpinellae complex

Similar species:

- Anthrenus nipponensis, also known from Russia (Far East), Northern China, North Korea and Japan
