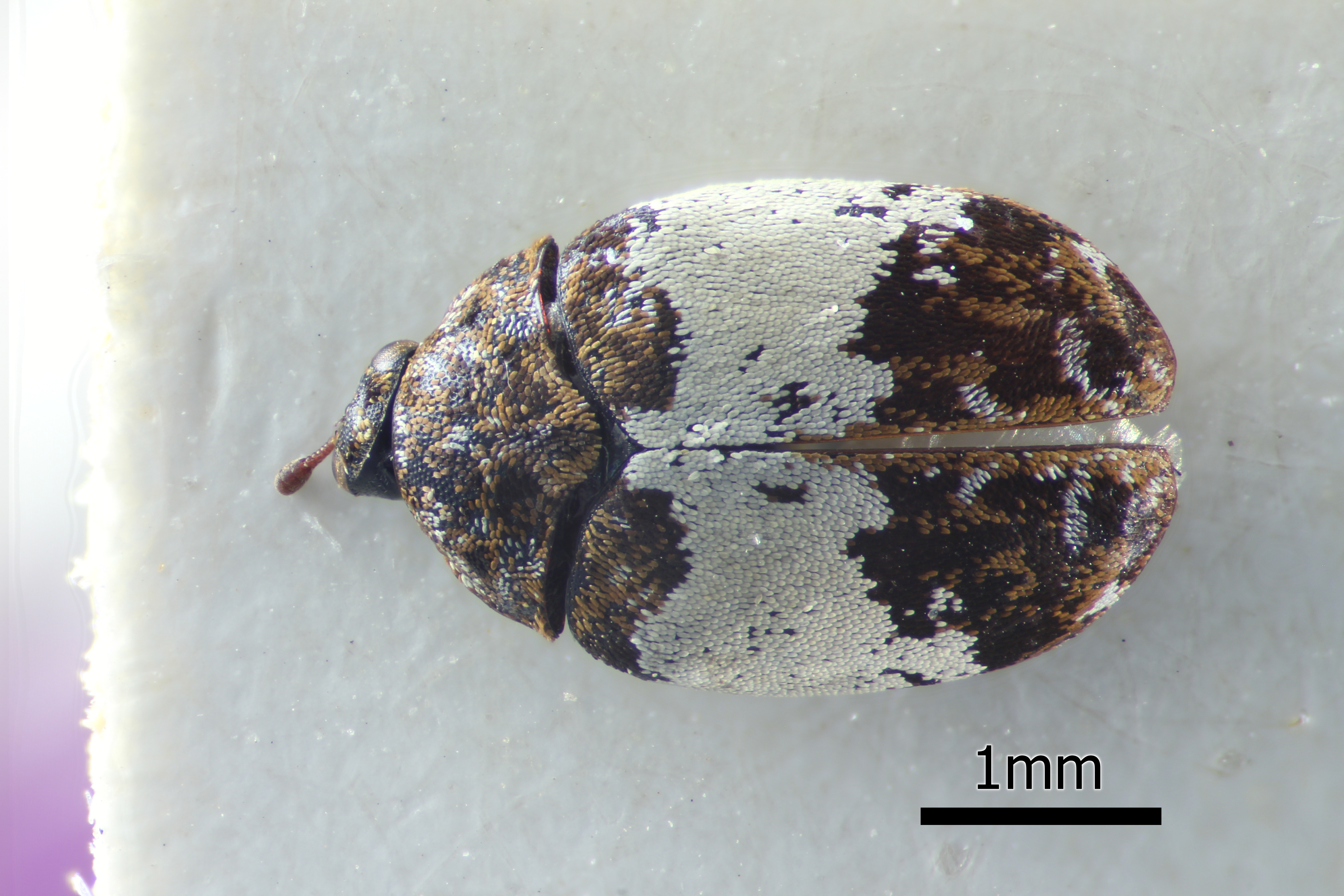

Scientific classification
- Kingdom: Animalia
- Phylum: Arthropoda
- Class: Insecta
- Order: Coleoptera
- Suborder: Polyphaga
- Family: Dermestidae
- Genus: Anthrenus
- Subgenus: Anthrenus
- Species: A. nipponensis

Binomial name
- Anthrenus nipponensis Kalík & Ohbayashi, 1985

= Anthrenus nipponensis =

Species of beetle

Anthrenus nipponensis is a species of carpet beetle in the family Dermestidae. It is known from North China, Japan, North Korea, and Russia (Far East).

== See also ==
- Anthrenus pimpinellae complex

Similar species:

- Anthrenus latefasciatus
