= Anthrenus corona =

Scientific classification
- Kingdom: Animalia
- Phylum: Arthropoda
- Class: Insecta
- Order: Coleoptera
- Suborder: Polyphaga
- Family: Dermestidae
- Genus: Anthrenus
- Subgenus: Anthrenus
- Species: A. corona

Binomial name
- Anthrenus corona Holloway, 2021

Species of beetle

Anthrenus corona is a species of carpet beetle in the family Dermestidae. It is known from Armenia, Austria, Bosnia, Bulgaria, Croatia, Georgia, Greece, Hungary, Italy, Macedonia, Montenegro, Portugal, Romania, Serbia, Sicily, Spain, Turkey, Iran, Jordan, and Syria.
