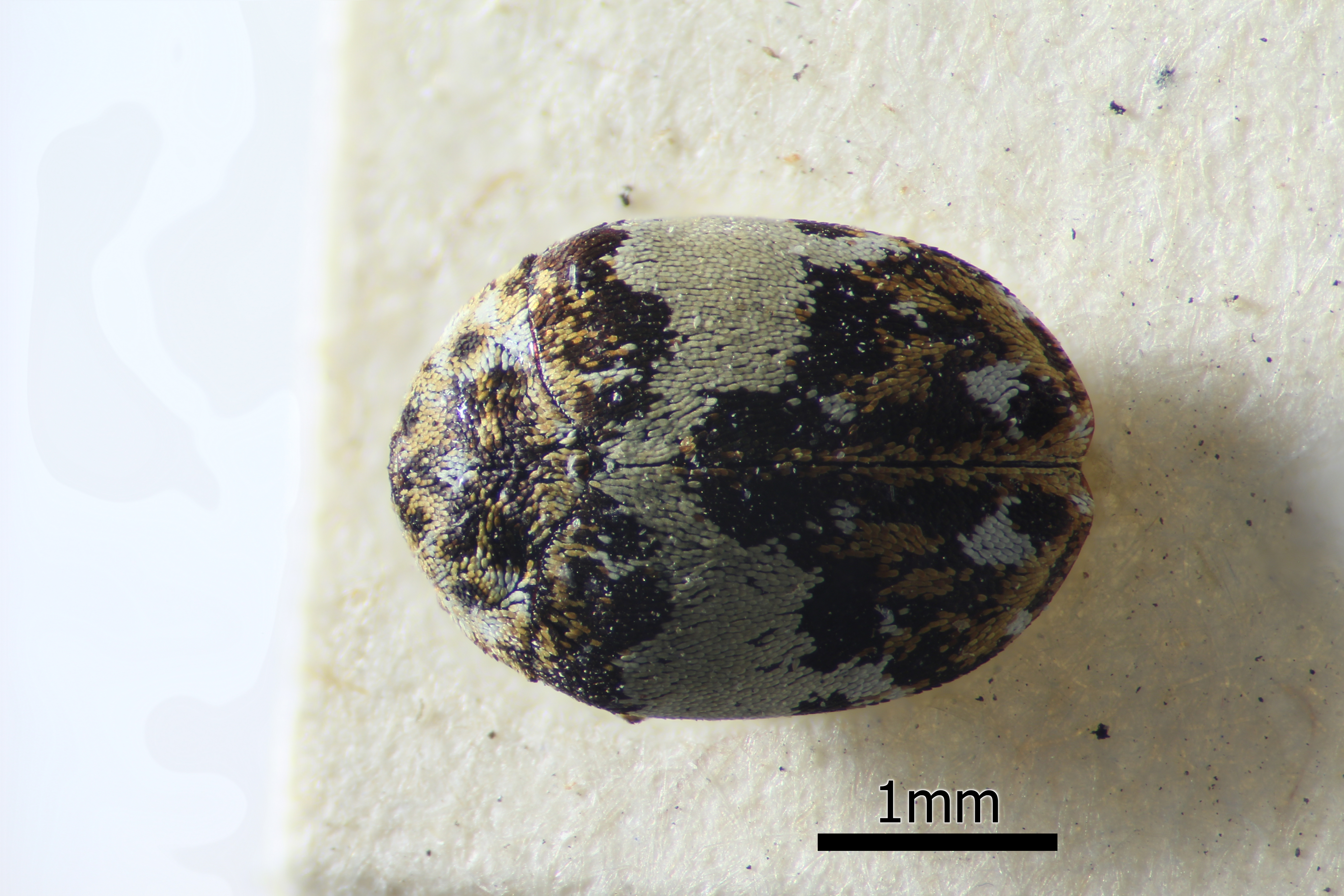

Scientific classification
- Kingdom: Animalia
- Phylum: Arthropoda
- Clade: Pancrustacea
- Class: Insecta
- Order: Coleoptera
- Suborder: Polyphaga
- Family: Dermestidae
- Genus: Anthrenus
- Subgenus: Anthrenus
- Species: A. isabellinus

Binomial name
- Anthrenus isabellinus Küster, 1848

Synonyms
- Anthrenus pimpinellae var. dorsatus Mulsant & Rey, 1868; Anthrenus pimpinellae var. niveus Reitter, 1881; Anthrenus pimpinellae var. niveipennis J. Sahlberg, 1903; Anthrenus fasciatus var. isabellinus Escalera, 1914; Anthrenus pimpinellae ssp. isabellinus Beal, 1998; Anthrenus pimpinellae var. dorsatus Mroczkowski, 1968; Anthrenus goliath Cornacchia, 2002; Anthrenus dorsatus Háva, 2003; Anthrenus pimpinellae isabellinus Háva & Nardi, 2004

= Anthrenus isabellinus =

Species of beetle

Anthrenus isabellinus is a species of carpet beetle in the family Dermestidae. It is known from France, Greece, Italy, Malta, Portugal, Spain, Algeria, Libya, Morocco, Tunisia, Israel, and has been introduced to the United States (East).
