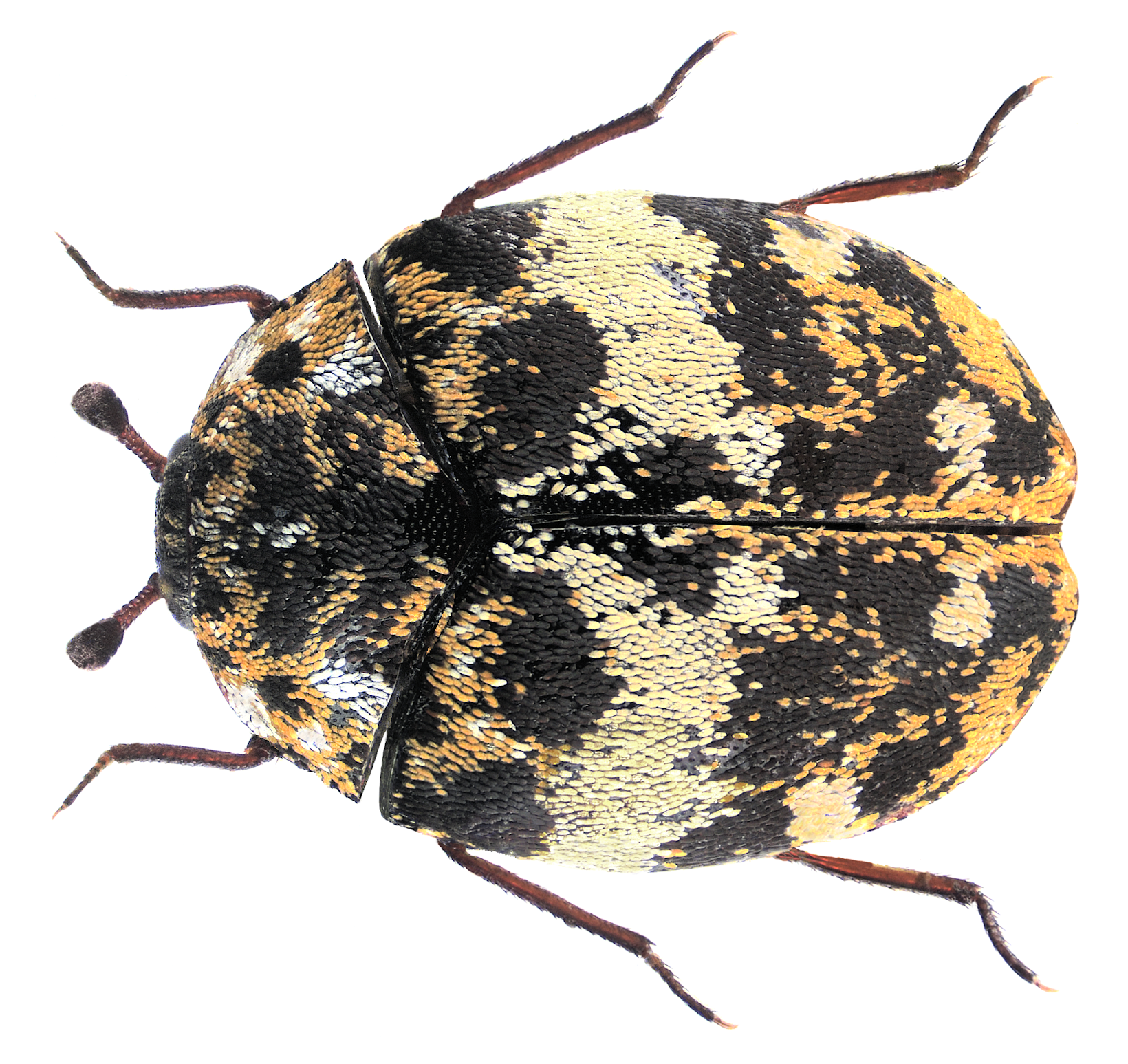

Scientific classification
- Kingdom: Animalia
- Phylum: Arthropoda
- Class: Insecta
- Order: Coleoptera
- Suborder: Polyphaga
- Family: Dermestidae
- Genus: Anthrenus
- Species: A. delicatus

Binomial name
- Anthrenus delicatus Kiesenwetter, 1851

= Anthrenus delicatus =

Species of beetle

Anthrenus delicatus is a species of carpet beetle in the subgenus Anthrenus of the genus Anthrenus, family Dermestidae. It is known from Albania, Andorra, Armenia, Azerbaijan, Bosnia and Herzegovina, Bulgaria, Crete, Croatia, Cyprus, France, Georgia, Greece, Italy, Macedonia, Montenegro, Portugal, Romania, Serbia, Spain, Turkey, Algeria, Egypt, Morocco, Tunisia, the Caucasus, Iran, Israel, Jordan, and Syria.

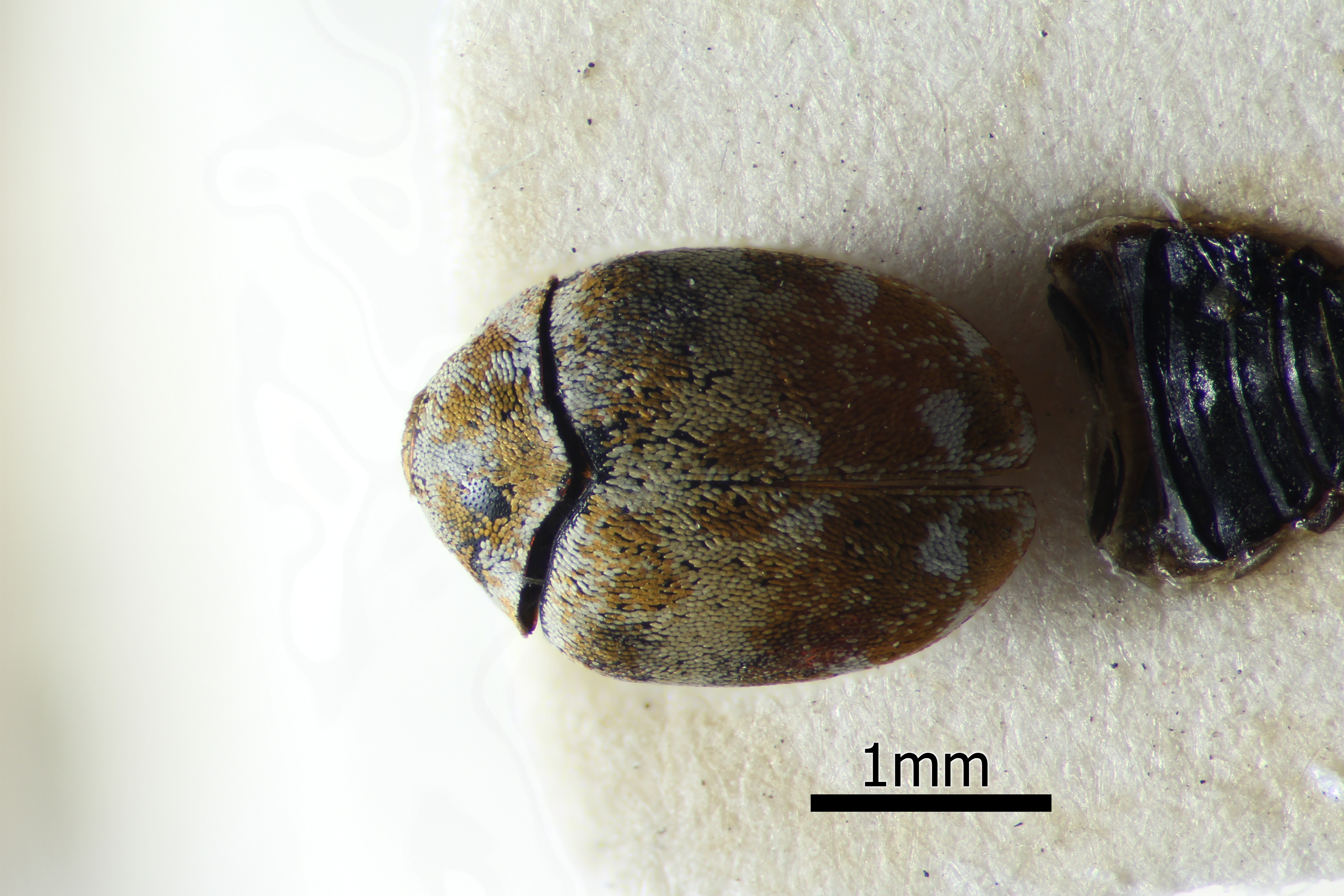
Anthrenus delicatus armstrongi
