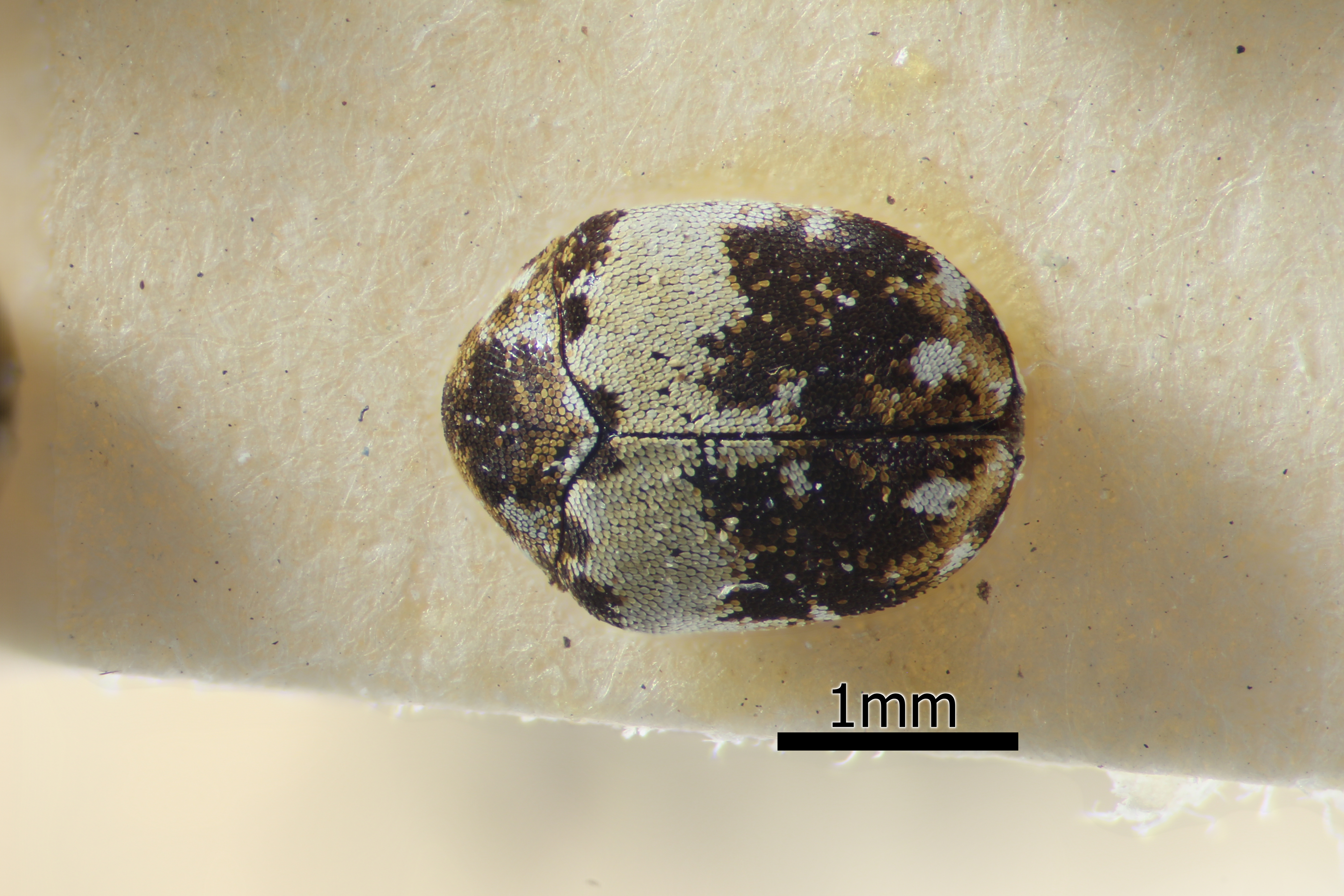

Scientific classification
- Kingdom: Animalia
- Phylum: Arthropoda
- Class: Insecta
- Order: Coleoptera
- Suborder: Polyphaga
- Family: Dermestidae
- Genus: Anthrenus
- Subgenus: Anthrenus
- Species: A. oceanicus

Binomial name
- Anthrenus oceanicus Fauvel, 1903

Synonyms
- Anthrenus fasciatus Herbst, 1797 (hom.); Anthrenus fasciatus var. latebasalis Pic, 1927; Anthrenus pimpinellae var. basifasciatus Pic, 1935; Anthrenus vorax var. latebasalis Hinton, 1945

= Anthrenus oceanicus =

Species of beetle

Anthrenus (Anthrenus) oceanicus, is a species of skin beetle native to Hawaii, India, China, Indonesia (Java, Madura, Malaysia), Sri Lanka, New Caledonia and Mauritius. It is introduced to Egypt, French Polynesia, Czech Republic and England particularly with commodities.

== Description ==
Body length is about 2.5 to 2.25 mm. First abdominal sternite is without a black lateral spot. The elytral transverse band is white and broad.

== Relationship to humans ==
This species can seriously damage carpets and other woollen goods in stores.
