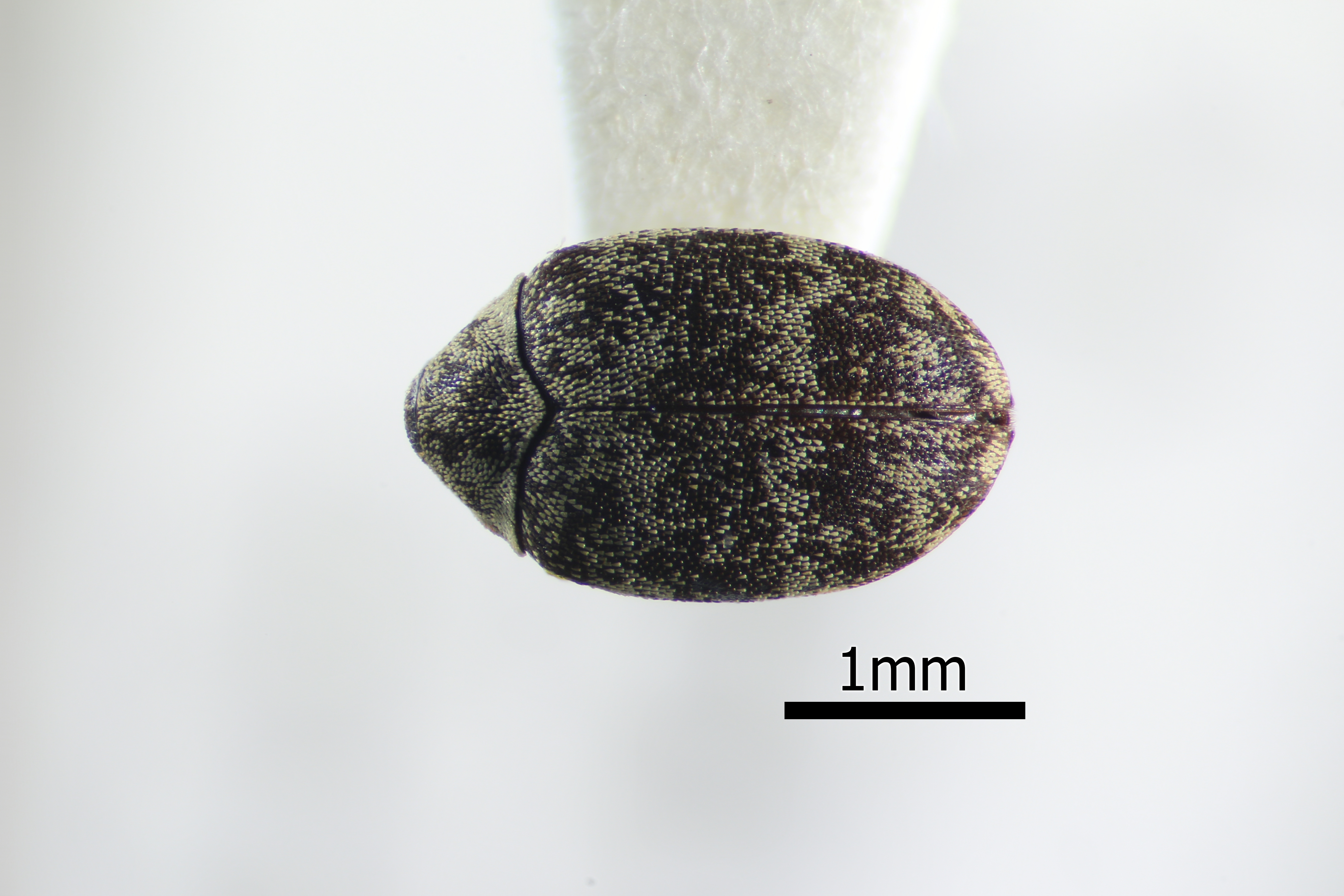

Scientific classification
- Kingdom: Animalia
- Phylum: Arthropoda
- Class: Insecta
- Order: Coleoptera
- Suborder: Polyphaga
- Family: Dermestidae
- Genus: Anthrenus
- Subgenus: Florilinus
- Species: A. japonicus

Binomial name
- Anthrenus japonicus Ohbayashi, 1985

= Anthrenus japonicus =

Species of beetle

Anthrenus japonicus is a species of carpet beetle in the subgenus Florilinus of the genus Anthrenus, family Dermestidae. It is known from Japan.

== See also ==
- Anthrenus tanakai
- Anthrenus shikokensis
