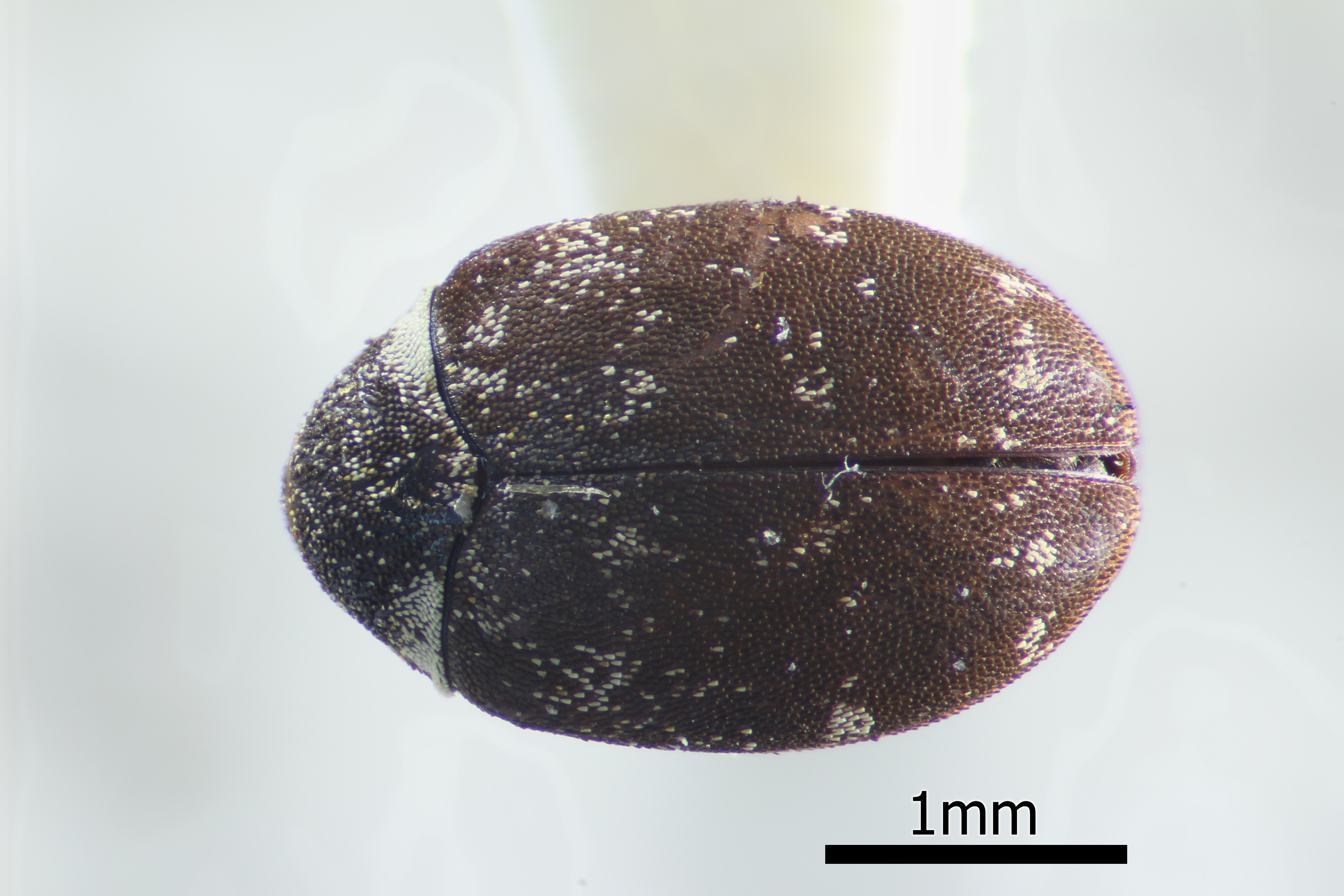

Scientific classification
- Kingdom: Animalia
- Phylum: Arthropoda
- Clade: Pancrustacea
- Class: Insecta
- Order: Coleoptera
- Suborder: Polyphaga
- Family: Dermestidae
- Genus: Anthrenus
- Subgenus: Florilinus
- Species: A. tanakai

Binomial name
- Anthrenus tanakai Ohbayashi, 1985

= Anthrenus tanakai =

Species of beetle

Anthrenus tanakai is a species of carpet beetle in the family Dermestidae. It is known from Japan (Honshu, Kyushu) and the Korean Peninsula.

== See also ==
- Anthrenus japonicus
- Anthrenus shikokensis
