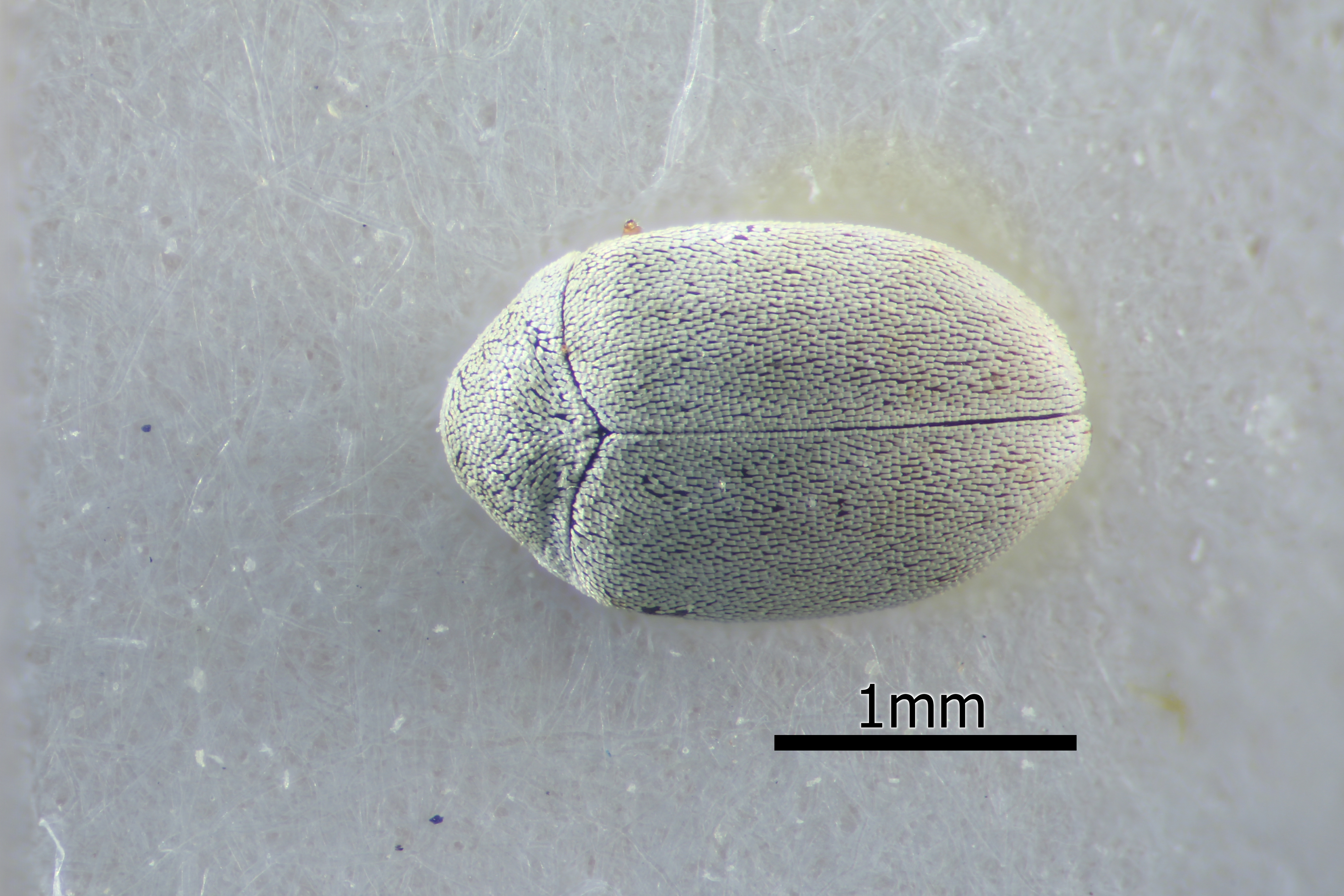

Scientific classification
- Kingdom: Animalia
- Phylum: Arthropoda
- Class: Insecta
- Order: Coleoptera
- Suborder: Polyphaga
- Family: Dermestidae
- Genus: Anthrenus
- Subgenus: Solskinus
- Species: A. assimilis

Binomial name
- Anthrenus assimilis Zhantiev, 1976

= Anthrenus assimilis =

Species of beetle

Anthrenus assimilis is a species of carpet beetle in the subgenus Solskinus of the genus Anthrenus, family Dermestidae. It is known from Kyrgyzstan and Uzbekistan.
