= Anthrenus beali =

Scientific classification
- Kingdom: Animalia
- Phylum: Arthropoda
- Class: Insecta
- Order: Coleoptera
- Suborder: Polyphaga
- Family: Dermestidae
- Genus: Anthrenus
- Subgenus: Solskinus
- Species: A. beali

Binomial name
- Anthrenus beali Zhantiev, 2004

Species of beetle

Anthrenus (Solskinus) beali is a species of carpet beetle in the family Dermestidae. It is known from Kyrgyzstan.

== Etymology ==
The species is named after Richard S. Beal, an American researcher who made a significant contribution to the study of the family Dermestidae.

== See also ==
- Anthrenus dsungaricus
- Anthrenus sogdianus
