= Anthrenus kompantzevi =

Scientific classification
- Kingdom: Animalia
- Phylum: Arthropoda
- Clade: Pancrustacea
- Class: Insecta
- Order: Coleoptera
- Suborder: Polyphaga
- Family: Dermestidae
- Genus: Anthrenus
- Subgenus: Florilinus
- Species: A. kompantzevi

Binomial name
- Anthrenus kompantzevi Zhantiev, 2004

Species of beetle

Anthrenus (Florilinus) kompantzevi is a little known species of carpet beetle in the family Dermestidae native to Kyrgyzstan. Species have been noted from southwest part of Kyrgyzstan (specifically in Sary-Chelek Nature Reserve) to the Kyrgyz Ala-Too mountain range near canyons of Kara Balta river.

== Differential diagnosis ==
Within subgenus Florilinus (characterized by 8-segmented antennae), the species can be distinguished through differences in the shape of the aedeagus and the structure of the antennal club. Specifically, the final segment of the club is nearly 11 times longer in males and 5.3 times longer in females compared to the preceding segment.

== Etymology ==
The species is named in honor of A.V. Kompantsev, who collected the type specimen that was later provided to Zhantiev.
