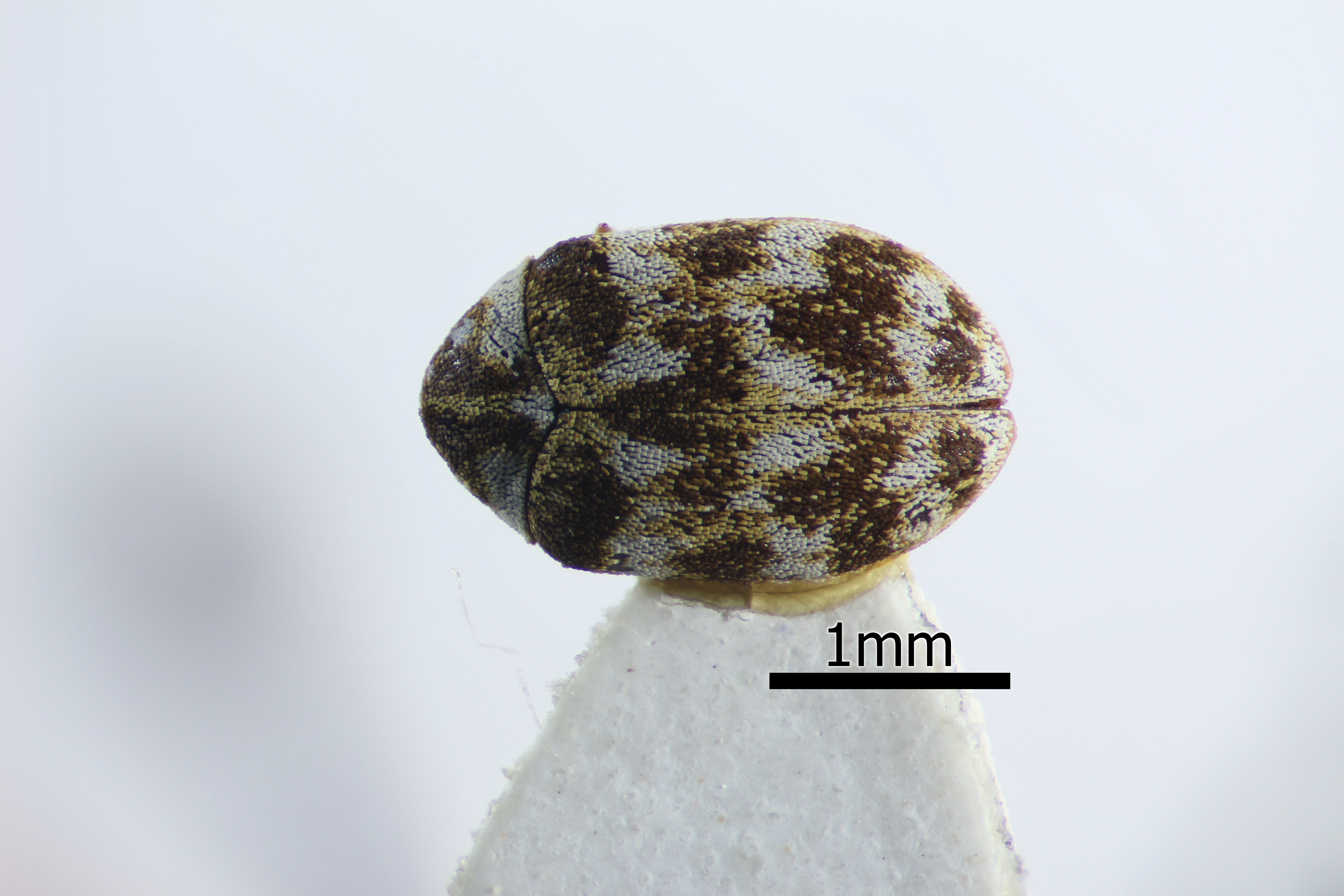

Scientific classification
- Kingdom: Animalia
- Phylum: Arthropoda
- Class: Insecta
- Order: Coleoptera
- Suborder: Polyphaga
- Family: Dermestidae
- Genus: Anthrenus
- Subgenus: Solskinus
- Species: A. sogdianus

Binomial name
- Anthrenus sogdianus Zhantiev, 1976

= Anthrenus sogdianus =

Species of beetle

Anthrenus (Solskinus) sogdianus is a species of carpet beetle in the family Dermestidae. It is present in Central Asia (Kyrgyzstan, Tajikistan). Based on current records, the species is known to inhabit mountainous regions situated from west to north of lake Issyk-Kul in Kyrgyzstan.

The species Anthrenus sogdianus can often be mistaken for Anthrenus dsungaricus due to subtle visual differences, but it is distinguishable by the longitudinal stripe of light scales on the elytral disc. Both species are also related to Anthrenus beali, however the elytral background of this species is predominantly composed from brown scales (as opposed to yellow).
