= Anthrenus araxensis =

Scientific classification
- Kingdom: Animalia
- Phylum: Arthropoda
- Class: Insecta
- Order: Coleoptera
- Suborder: Polyphaga
- Family: Dermestidae
- Genus: Anthrenus
- Subgenus: Florilinus
- Species: A. araxensis

Binomial name
- Anthrenus araxensis Zhantiev, 1976

Species of beetle

Anthrenus araxensis is a species of carpet beetle in the family Dermestidae. It is known from Armenia.
