= Anthrenus ussuricus =

Scientific classification
- Kingdom: Animalia
- Phylum: Arthropoda
- Class: Insecta
- Order: Coleoptera
- Suborder: Polyphaga
- Family: Dermestidae
- Genus: Anthrenus
- Subgenus: Florilinus
- Species: A. ussuricus

Binomial name
- Anthrenus ussuricus Zhantiev, 1988

Species of beetle

Anthrenus (Florilinus) ussuricus is a species of carpet beetle found in North Korea and Primorskiy Krai, Russia.
