= Anthrenus jacobsoni =

Scientific classification
- Kingdom: Animalia
- Phylum: Arthropoda
- Class: Insecta
- Order: Coleoptera
- Suborder: Polyphaga
- Family: Dermestidae
- Genus: Anthrenus
- Subgenus: Solskinus
- Species: A. jacobsoni

Binomial name
- Anthrenus jacobsoni Zhantiev, 1976

Species of beetle

Anthrenus (Solskinus) jacobsoni is a species of carpet beetle in the family Dermestidae. It is known from Tajikistan.
