= Anthrenus parthicus =

Scientific classification
- Kingdom: Animalia
- Phylum: Arthropoda
- Class: Insecta
- Order: Coleoptera
- Suborder: Polyphaga
- Family: Dermestidae
- Genus: Anthrenus
- Subgenus: Anthrenops
- Species: A. parthicus

Binomial name
- Anthrenus parthicus Zhantiev, 1976

Species of beetle

Anthrenus (Anthrenops) parthicus is a species of carpet beetle found in Iran, Turkmenistan, and Uzbekistan.
