= Anthrenus bactrianus =

Scientific classification
- Kingdom: Animalia
- Phylum: Arthropoda
- Class: Insecta
- Order: Coleoptera
- Suborder: Polyphaga
- Family: Dermestidae
- Genus: Anthrenus
- Subgenus: Florilinus
- Species: A. bactrianus

Binomial name
- Anthrenus bactrianus Zhantiev, 2004

Species of beetle

Anthrenus bactrianus is a species of carpet beetle in the family Dermestidae. It is known from Tajikistan.
