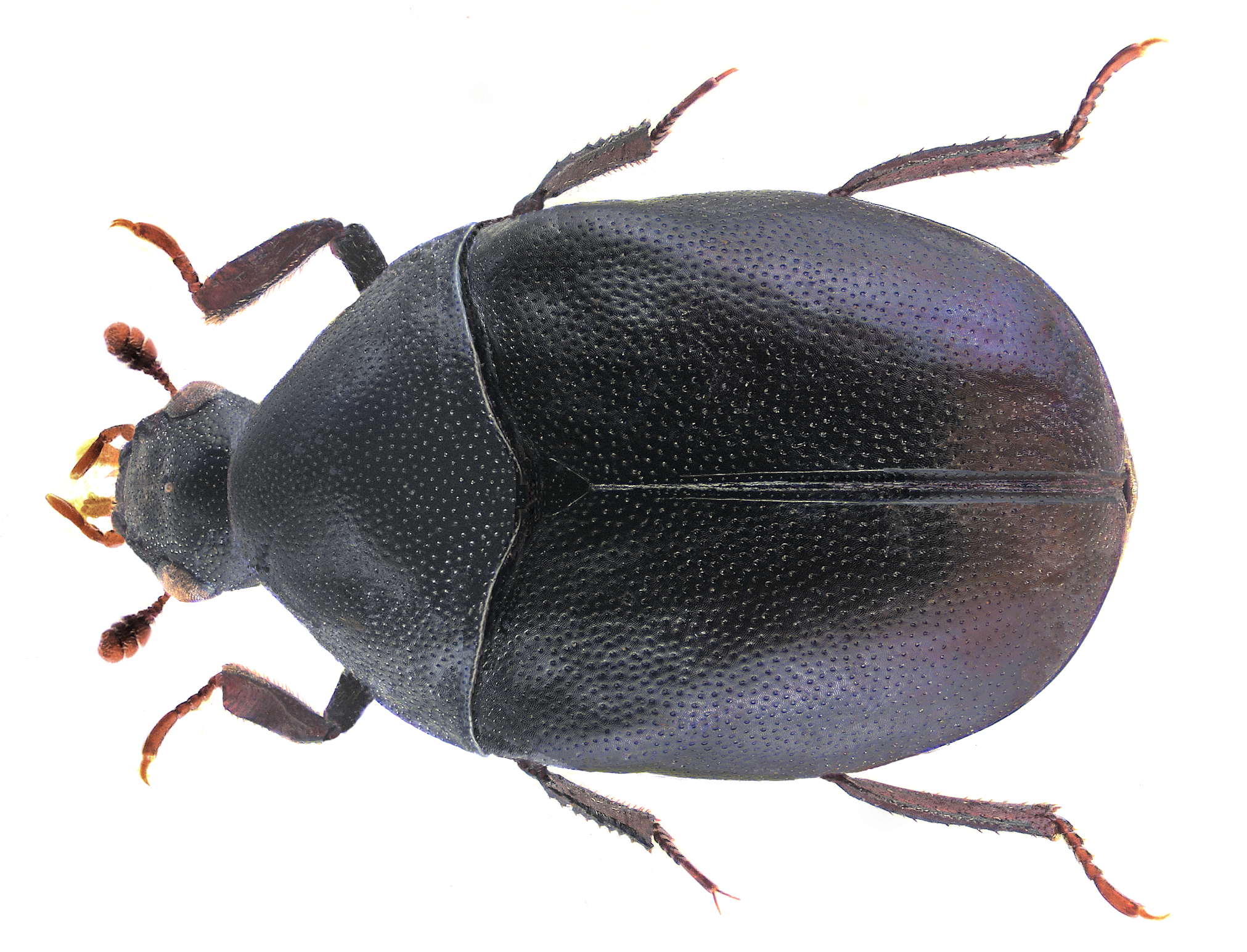

Scientific classification
- Kingdom: Animalia
- Phylum: Arthropoda
- Class: Insecta
- Order: Coleoptera
- Suborder: Polyphaga
- Family: Dermestidae
- Genus: Orphilus
- Species: O. beali

Binomial name
- Orphilus beali Zhantiev, 2001

= Orphilus beali =

Species of beetle

Orphilus beali is a species of carpet beetle found in Europe (Albania, Crete, Croatia, Cyprus, France, Greece, Montenegro, Portugal, Spain, Turkey, with possible records from Italy) and Middle East (Iraq, Israel, Jordan, Lebanon, Syria).
