= Anthrenus kaszabi =

Scientific classification
- Kingdom: Animalia
- Phylum: Arthropoda
- Class: Insecta
- Order: Coleoptera
- Suborder: Polyphaga
- Family: Dermestidae
- Genus: Anthrenus
- Subgenus: Florilinus
- Species: A. kaszabi

Binomial name
- Anthrenus kaszabi Zhantiev, 1973

Species of beetle

Anthrenus (Florilinus) kaszabi is a species of carpet beetle native to Mongolia.
