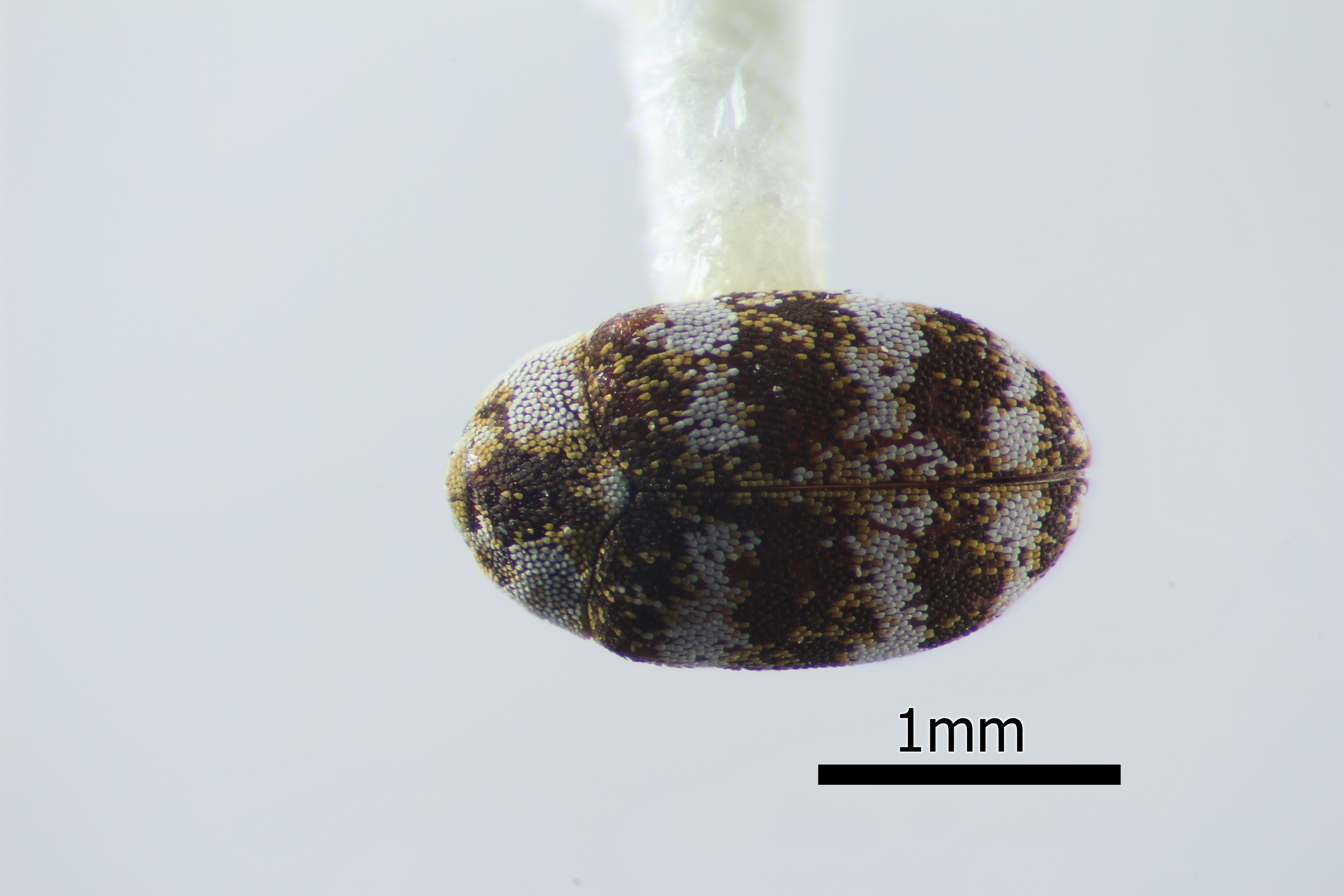
- Anthrenus (Anthrenops) coloratus, also known as Asian carpet beetle

Scientific classification
- Kingdom: Animalia
- Phylum: Arthropoda
- Class: Insecta
- Order: Coleoptera
- Suborder: Polyphaga
- Family: Dermestidae
- Genus: Anthrenus
- Subgenus: Anthrenops; Reitter, 1881

Species
- See text.

= Anthrenops =

Subgenus of beetles

Anthrenops is a subgenus of the genus Anthrenus of the subfamily Megatominae within the family of skin beetles. Subgenus is distinguished by antennae with 9 segments.

== Species ==
According to World Dermestidae catalogue, these species currently belong to subgenus Anthrenops:

- Anthrenus aradensis (Mawlood & Abdul–Rassoul, 2003) – Iraq; Iran
- Anthrenus aristophanousi (Háva & Matsumoto, 2022) – Angola; Gabon
- Anthrenus bellulus (Chobaut, 1897) – Algeria
- Anthrenus bobo (Háva, 2003) – Burkina Faso
- Anthrenus cervenkai (Háva & Herrmann, 2006) – Oman; Yemen
- Anthrenus coloratus (Reitter, 1881) – Asia; Europe; Africa; North America (Mexico, United States); Introduced in Ecuador
- Anthrenus danielssoni (Háva, 2007) – Gambia
- Anthrenus emiratensis (Háva, 2023) – United Arab Emirates
- Anthrenus endroedyi (Háva, 2003) – Gabon; Ghana; Ivory Coast
- Anthrenus eichleri (Kadej & Háva, 2006) – Azerbaijan; Turkey; Israel; Palestine
- Anthrenus fugong (Háva, 2019) – China (Yunnan)
- Anthrenus geisthardti (Háva & Herrmann, 2006) – Yemen; Oman
- Anthrenus ghanae (Háva, 2022) – Ghana
- Anthrenus gobicus (Zhantiev, 2004) – Mongolia
- Anthrenus hissaricus (Mroczkowski, 1961) – Russia (Dagestan); Tajikistan
- Anthrenus kadeji (Herrmann & Háva, 2009) – Pakistan
- Anthrenus longus (Arrow, 1915) – Tanzania (Tanganyika); Yemen (Socotra)
- Anthrenus luteovestitus (Pic, 1937) – Kenya
- Anthrenus medvedevi (Zhantiev, 2006) – Kyrgyzstan
- Anthrenus megalops (Arrow, 1915) – Eritrea; Ethiopia
- Anthrenus nahiricus (Zhantiev, 1976) – Armenia
- Anthrenus oculatus (Arrow, 1937) – Congo; Kenya
- Anthrenus ornatus (Kocher, 1955) – Spain; Morocco
- Anthrenus paraclaviger (Háva & Kadej, 2008) – Eritrea
- Anthrenus parthicus (Zhantiev, 1976) – Iran; Turkmenistan; Uzbekistan
- Anthrenus splendidus (Háva, 2004) – Botswana; Namibia; South Africa
- Anthrenus stolidus (Háva, 2023) – India (Maharashtra)
- Anthrenus subclaviger (Reitter, 1881) – India; Kyrgyzstan; Pakistan; Saudi Arabia; Yemen
- Anthrenus zagrosensis (Háva, 2004) – Iran
- Anthrenus zebra (Reitter, 1889) – Armenia; Azerbaijan; Russia (South West); Turkey; Afghanistan; Iran; Turkmenistan
