= Anthrenus oberthueri =

Scientific classification
- Kingdom: Animalia
- Phylum: Arthropoda
- Class: Insecta
- Order: Coleoptera
- Suborder: Polyphaga
- Family: Dermestidae
- Genus: Anthrenus
- Subgenus: Florilinus
- Species: A. oberthueri

Binomial name
- Anthrenus oberthueri Reitter, 1881

Species of beetle

Anthrenus oberthueri is a species of carpet beetle in the family Dermestidae. It is known from Corsica, Italy, Sicily, Spain, Algeria, and Tunisia.
