= Anthrenus longus =

Scientific classification
- Kingdom: Animalia
- Phylum: Arthropoda
- Class: Insecta
- Order: Coleoptera
- Suborder: Polyphaga
- Family: Dermestidae
- Genus: Anthrenus
- Subgenus: Anthrenops
- Species: A. longus

Binomial name
- Anthrenus longus Arrow, 1915

Species of beetle

Anthrenus (Anthrenops) longus is a species of carpet beetle found in Tanzania (Tanganyika) and Yemen (Socotra).
