= Anthrenus aradensis =

Scientific classification
- Kingdom: Animalia
- Phylum: Arthropoda
- Class: Insecta
- Order: Coleoptera
- Suborder: Polyphaga
- Family: Dermestidae
- Genus: Anthrenus
- Subgenus: Anthrenops
- Species: A. aradensis

Binomial name
- Anthrenus aradensis Mawlood & Abdul–Rassoul, 2003

Species of beetle

Anthrenus (Anthrenops) aradensis is a species of carpet beetle found in Iraq and Iran.
