= Anthrenus danielssoni =

Scientific classification
- Kingdom: Animalia
- Phylum: Arthropoda
- Class: Insecta
- Order: Coleoptera
- Suborder: Polyphaga
- Family: Dermestidae
- Genus: Anthrenus
- Subgenus: Anthrenops
- Species: A. danielssoni

Binomial name
- Anthrenus danielssoni Háva, 2007

Species of carpet beetle

Anthrenus (Anthrenops) danielssoni is a species of carpet beetle found in Gambia.

== See also ==
Other Anthrenus species of Gambia:

- Anthrenus senegalensis
