= Anthrenus zhantievi =

Scientific classification
- Kingdom: Animalia
- Phylum: Arthropoda
- Class: Insecta
- Order: Coleoptera
- Suborder: Polyphaga
- Family: Dermestidae
- Genus: Anthrenus
- Subgenus: Florilinus
- Species: A. zhantievi

Binomial name
- Anthrenus zhantievi Háva & Kadej, 2006

Species of beetle

Anthrenus (Florilinus) zhantievi is a species of carpet beetle native to Indian state of Himachal Pradesh.
