= Anthrenus hissaricus =

Scientific classification
- Kingdom: Animalia
- Phylum: Arthropoda
- Class: Insecta
- Order: Coleoptera
- Suborder: Polyphaga
- Family: Dermestidae
- Genus: Anthrenus
- Subgenus: Anthrenops
- Species: A. hissaricus

Binomial name
- Anthrenus hissaricus Mroczkowski, 1961

Species of beetle

Anthrenus hissaricus is a species of carpet beetle in the family Dermestidae. It is known from Tajikistan and Russia (Dagestan).
