= Anthrenus moroccanus =

Scientific classification
- Kingdom: Animalia
- Phylum: Arthropoda
- Class: Insecta
- Order: Coleoptera
- Suborder: Polyphaga
- Family: Dermestidae
- Genus: Anthrenus
- Subgenus: Florilinus
- Species: A. moroccanus

Binomial name
- Anthrenus moroccanus Háva, 2015

Species of beetle

Anthrenus (Florilinus) moroccanus is a species of carpet beetle native to Morocco.
