= Anthrenus luteovestitus =

Scientific classification
- Kingdom: Animalia
- Phylum: Arthropoda
- Class: Insecta
- Order: Coleoptera
- Suborder: Polyphaga
- Family: Dermestidae
- Genus: Anthrenus
- Subgenus: Anthrenops
- Species: A. luteovestitus

Binomial name
- Anthrenus luteovestitus Pic, 1937

Species of beetle

Anthrenus (Anthrenops) luteovestitus is a species of carpet beetle found in Kenya.
