= Anthrenus loebli =

Scientific classification
- Kingdom: Animalia
- Phylum: Arthropoda
- Class: Insecta
- Order: Coleoptera
- Suborder: Polyphaga
- Family: Dermestidae
- Genus: Anthrenus
- Subgenus: Florilinus
- Species: A. loebli

Binomial name
- Anthrenus loebli Kadej & Háva, 2010

Species of beetle

Anthrenus (Florilinus) loebli is a species of carpet beetle found in Israel, Jordan, and Lebanon.
