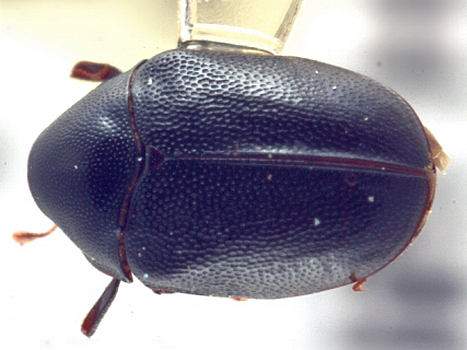
- Orphilus ater

Scientific classification
- Kingdom: Animalia
- Phylum: Arthropoda
- Class: Insecta
- Order: Coleoptera
- Suborder: Polyphaga
- Family: Dermestidae
- Genus: Orphilus
- Species: O. ater

Binomial name
- Orphilus ater Erichson, 1846

= Orphilus ater =

Species of beetle

Orphilus ater is a species of carpet beetle in the family Dermestidae. It is found in North America.
