= Anthrenus eichleri =

Scientific classification
- Kingdom: Animalia
- Phylum: Arthropoda
- Class: Insecta
- Order: Coleoptera
- Suborder: Polyphaga
- Family: Dermestidae
- Genus: Anthrenus
- Subgenus: Anthrenops
- Species: A. eichleri

Binomial name
- Anthrenus eichleri Kadej & Háva, 2006

Species of beetle

Anthrenus (Anthrenops) eichleri is a species of carpet beetle found in Azerbaijan, Turkey and Israel.
