= Anthrenus kadeji =

Scientific classification
- Kingdom: Animalia
- Phylum: Arthropoda
- Class: Insecta
- Order: Coleoptera
- Suborder: Polyphaga
- Family: Dermestidae
- Genus: Anthrenus
- Subgenus: Anthrenops
- Species: A. kadeji

Binomial name
- Anthrenus kadeji Herrmann & Háva, 2009

Species of beetle

Anthrenus (Anthrenops) kadeji is a species of carpet beetle found in Pakistan.
