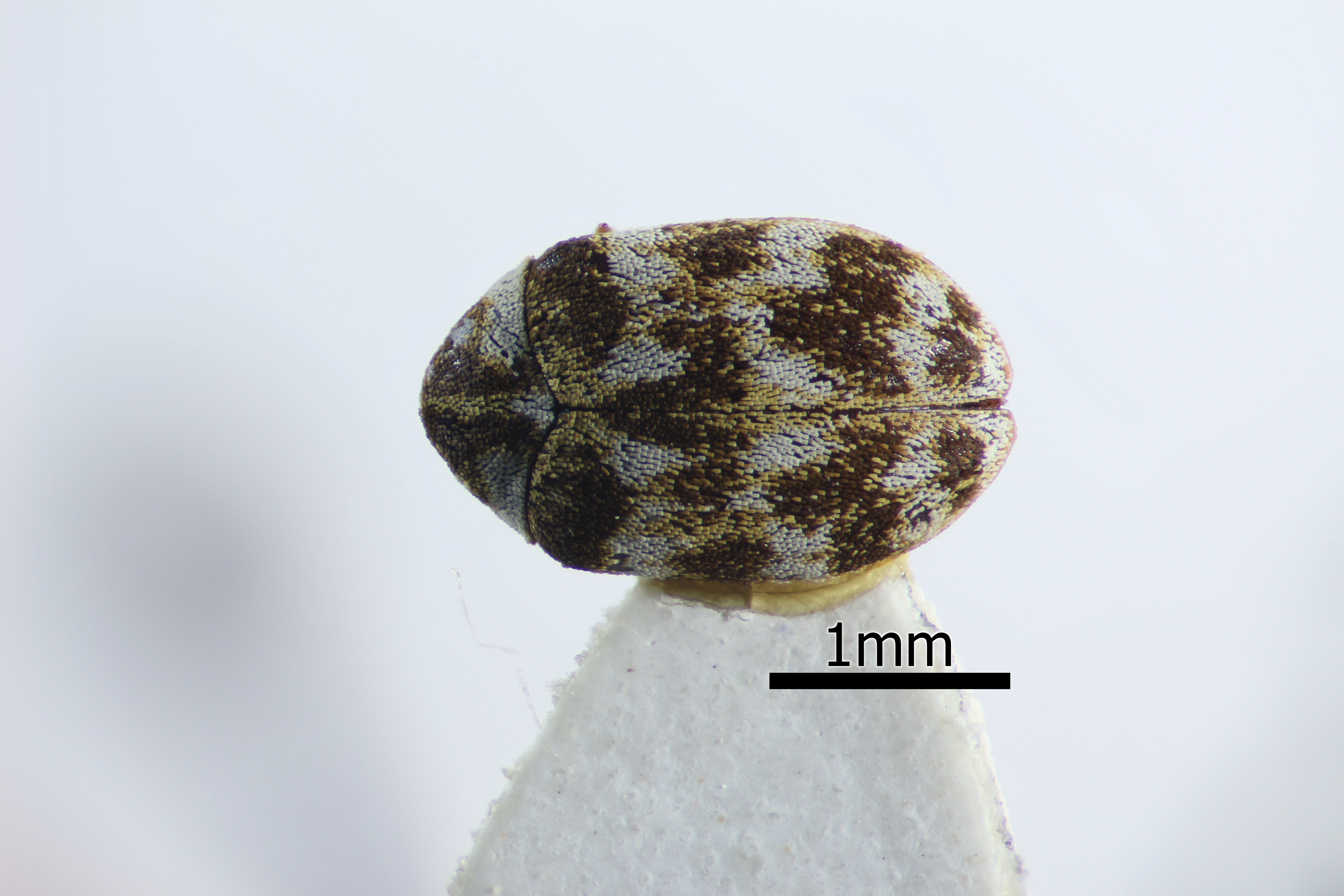
- Anthrenus sogdianus, a species of the subgenus Solskinus

Scientific classification
- Domain: Eukaryota
- Kingdom: Animalia
- Phylum: Arthropoda
- Class: Insecta
- Order: Coleoptera
- Suborder: Polyphaga
- Family: Dermestidae
- Genus: Anthrenus
- Subgenus: Solskinus; Mroczkowski, 1962

Species
- See text.

= Solskinus =

Subgenus of beetles

Solskinus is a subgenus of the genus Anthrenus of the subfamily Megatominae within the family of skin beetles. Subgenus is distinguished by antennae with 7 segments.

== Species ==
According to World Dermestidae catalogue, these species currently belong to subgenus Solskinus, with most being present only in parts of Asia:

- Anthrenus assimilis (Zhantiev, 1976) – Kyrgyzstan; Uzbekistan
- Anthrenus auratus (Zhantiev, 1979) – Uzbekistan
- Anthrenus beali (Zhantiev, 2004) – Kyrgyzstan
- Anthrenus becvari (Háva, 2004) – China (Yunnan)
- Anthrenus bucharicus (Zhantiev, 1976) – Turkmenistan; Uzbekistan
- Anthrenus darjeelingi (Háva, 2020) – India (Darjeeling)
- Anthrenus dsungaricus (Mroczkowski, 1962) – Kazakhstan; Kyrgyzstan
- Anthrenus heptamerus (Peyerimhoff, 1924) – Algeria; Morocco
- Anthrenus jacobsoni (Zhantiev, 1976) – Tajikistan
- Anthrenus katmandui (Kadej, Háva & Kitano, 2016) – Nepal
- Anthrenus leucogrammus (Solsky, 1876) – Tajikistan; Uzbekistan
- Anthrenus milkoi (Zhantiev, 2004) – Russia (Dagestan); Kazakhstan
- Anthrenus similis (Zhantiev, 1976) – Kyrgyzstan; Tajikistan; West Tianshan
- Anthrenus sinensis (Arrow, 1915) – Northern China; Northern India; Russia (Primorskiy Kray)
- Anthrenus sogdianus (Zhantiev, 1976) – Kyrgyzstan; Tajikistan
- Anthrenus tadzhicus (Mroczkowski, 1961) – Russia (Dagestan); Tajikistan
- Anthrenus talassicus (Sokolov, 1980) – Kazakhstan
