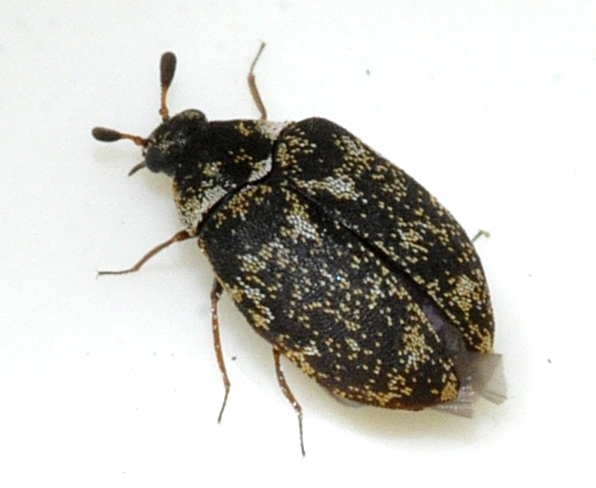
- Anthrenus museorum, common species from the subgenus (cosmopolitan)

Scientific classification
- Domain: Eukaryota
- Kingdom: Animalia
- Phylum: Arthropoda
- Class: Insecta
- Order: Coleoptera
- Suborder: Polyphaga
- Family: Dermestidae
- Genus: Anthrenus
- Subgenus: Florilinus; Mulsant & Rey, 1868

Species
- See text.

= Florilinus =

Subgenus of beetles

Florilinus is a subgenus of the genus Anthrenus of the subfamily Megatominae within the family of skin beetles. Subgenus is distinguished by antennae with 8 segments.

== Species ==
According to World Dermestidae catalogue, these species currently belong to subgenus Florilinus:

- Anthrenus araxensis (Zhantiev, 1976) – Armenia
- Anthrenus bactrianus (Zhantiev, 2004) – Tajikistan
- Anthrenus bajtenovi (Sokolov, 1974) – Kazakhstan
- Anthrenus blanci (Beal, 1998) – Canada (British Columbia); United States (California, Oregon, Washington)
- Anthrenus castaneae (Melsheimer, 1844) – Canada; United States
- Anthrenus caucasicus (Reitter, 1881) – Caucasus region (including Armenia, Georgia); Iran; Turkmenistan. Introduced to Austria, Latvia, Poland, Slovakia
- Anthrenus cimrmani (Háva, 2005) – China (Hebei)
- Anthrenus coreanus (Mroczkowski, 1966) – North Korea
- Anthrenus declamator (Háva, 2023) – Taiwan
- Anthrenus emili (Herrmann & Háva, 2019) – China (Sichuan, Yunnan)
- Anthrenus flavidus (Solsky, 1876) – Cyprus; Afghanistan; Caucasus region; China (Gansu, Shaanxi, Sichuan, Xinjiang); Iran; Kazakhstan; Kyrgyzstan; Russia; Tajikistan; Turkey; Turkmenistan; Uzbekistan. Introduced to Austria, Germany and Poland
- Anthrenus gracilis (Zhantiev, 2004) – Kazakhstan
- Anthrenus hartmanni (Háva, 2000) – India (Uttar Pradesh); Nepal
- Anthrenus japonicus (Ohbayashi, 1985) – Japan
- Anthrenus kaszabi (Zhantiev, 1973) – Mongolia
- Anthrenus kompantzevi (Zhantiev, 2004) – Kyrgyzstan
- Anthrenus kourili (Háva, 2006) – Bulgaria
- Anthrenus laosensis (Háva, 2023) – Laos
- Anthrenus loebli (Kadej & Háva, 2010) – Israel; Jordan; Lebanon
- Anthrenus mongolicus (Zhantiev, 1973) – Mongolia
- Anthrenus moroccanus (Háva, 2015) – Morocco
- Anthrenus mugodsharicus (Sokolov, 1974) – Kazakhstan
- Anthrenus museorum (Linnaeus, 1761) – Cosmopolitan
- Anthrenus nepalensis (Kadej & Háva, 2012) – Nepal
- Anthrenus oberthueri (Reitter, 1881) – Corsica; Italy; Sicily; Spain; Algeria; Tunisia
- Anthrenus ohbayashii (Kadej, Háva & Kitano, 2016) – Taiwan
- Anthrenus olgae (Kalík, 1946) – Austria; Bulgaria; Cyprus; Czech Republic; England; Finland; Germany; Hungary; Latvia; Montenegro; Netherlands; Poland; Russia (Astrakhan, Kalmykia); Slovakia; Sweden; Ukraine. Introduced to Canada
- Anthrenus pallidus (Sokolov, 1974) – Tajikistan
- Anthrenus qinlingensis (Háva, 2004) – China (Shanxi)
- Anthrenus shikokensis (Ohbayashi, 1985) – Japan (Shikoku I.)
- Anthrenus solskianus (Sokolov, 1974) – Kazakhstan; Turkmenistan
- Anthrenus sordidulus (Reitter, 1889) – Cyprus; Greece (Dodecanese Is., Rhodes I.); Russia (Dagestan); Spain; Turkey; Egypt; Israel; Syria
- Anthrenus sveci (Háva, 2004) – Cyprus; Greece; Turkey
- Anthrenus taiwanicus (Kadej, Háva & Kitano, 2016) – Taiwan
- Anthrenus tanakai (Ohbayashi, 1985) – Japan (Honshu I., Kyushu I.); Korea?
- Anthrenus tuvensis (Zhantiev, 1976) – Russia (Tuva)
- Anthrenus ussuricus (Zhantiev, 1988) – North Korea; Russia (Primorskiy)
- Anthrenus zhantievi (Háva & Kadej, 2006) – India (Himachal Pradesh)
