= Anthrenus sveci =

Scientific classification
- Kingdom: Animalia
- Phylum: Arthropoda
- Class: Insecta
- Order: Coleoptera
- Suborder: Polyphaga
- Family: Dermestidae
- Genus: Anthrenus
- Subgenus: Florilinus
- Species: A. sveci

Binomial name
- Anthrenus sveci Háva, 2004

Species of beetle

Anthrenus (Florilinus) sveci is a species of carpet beetle in the family Dermestidae. It is known from Cyprus, Greece, and Turkey.
