= Anthrenus coreanus =

Scientific classification
- Kingdom: Animalia
- Phylum: Arthropoda
- Class: Insecta
- Order: Coleoptera
- Suborder: Polyphaga
- Family: Dermestidae
- Genus: Anthrenus
- Subgenus: Florilinus
- Species: A. coreanus

Binomial name
- Anthrenus coreanus Mroczkowski, 1966

Species of beetle

Anthrenus (Florilinus) coreanus is a species of carpet beetle native to North Korea.
