= Anthrenus geisthardti =

Scientific classification
- Kingdom: Animalia
- Phylum: Arthropoda
- Class: Insecta
- Order: Coleoptera
- Suborder: Polyphaga
- Family: Dermestidae
- Genus: Anthrenus
- Subgenus: Anthrenops
- Species: A. geisthardti

Binomial name
- Anthrenus geisthardti Háva & Herrmann, 2006

Species of beetle

Anthrenus (Anthrenops) geisthardti is a species of carpet beetle found in Yemen and Oman.
