= Anthrenus sordidulus =

Scientific classification
- Kingdom: Animalia
- Phylum: Arthropoda
- Class: Insecta
- Order: Coleoptera
- Suborder: Polyphaga
- Family: Dermestidae
- Genus: Anthrenus
- Subgenus: Florilinus
- Species: A. sordidulus

Binomial name
- Anthrenus sordidulus Reitter, 1889

Species of beetle

Anthrenus (Florilinus) sordidulus is a species of carpet beetle found in various locations including Cyprus, Greece (Dodecanese Islands and Rhodes), Russia (Dagestan), Spain, Turkey, Egypt, Israel, and Syria.
