= Anthrenus subclaviger =

Scientific classification
- Kingdom: Animalia
- Phylum: Arthropoda
- Class: Insecta
- Order: Coleoptera
- Suborder: Polyphaga
- Family: Dermestidae
- Genus: Anthrenus
- Subgenus: Anthrenops
- Species: A. subclaviger

Binomial name
- Anthrenus subclaviger Reitter, 1881

Species of beetle

Anthrenus subclaviger is a species of carpet beetle in the family Dermestidae. It is known from India, Kyrgyzstan, Pakistan, Saudi Arabia, and Yemen.
