= Anthrenus splendidus =

Scientific classification
- Kingdom: Animalia
- Phylum: Arthropoda
- Class: Insecta
- Order: Coleoptera
- Suborder: Polyphaga
- Family: Dermestidae
- Genus: Anthrenus
- Subgenus: Anthrenops
- Species: A. splendidus

Binomial name
- Anthrenus splendidus Háva, 2004

Species of beetle

Anthrenus (Anthrenops) splendidus is a species of carpet beetle found in Botswana, Namibia, and South Africa.
