= Anthrenus emili =

Scientific classification
- Kingdom: Animalia
- Phylum: Arthropoda
- Class: Insecta
- Order: Coleoptera
- Suborder: Polyphaga
- Family: Dermestidae
- Genus: Anthrenus
- Subgenus: Florilinus
- Species: A. emili

Binomial name
- Anthrenus emili Herrmann & Háva, 2019

Species of beetle

Anthrenus (Florilinus) emili is a species of carpet beetle in the family Dermestidae. It is known from China (Sichuan, Yunnan).
