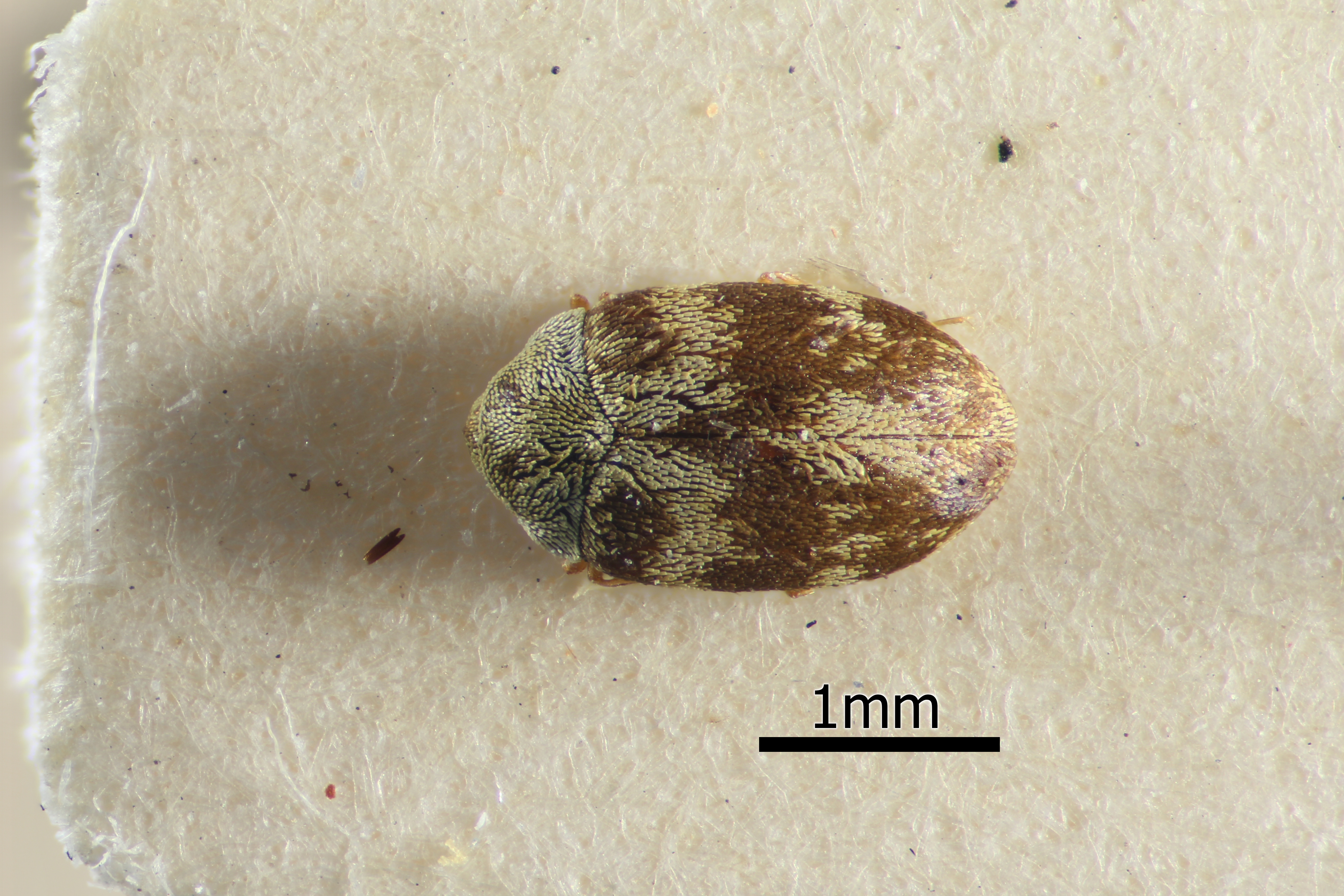
- Anthrenus flavidus, male

Scientific classification
- Kingdom: Animalia
- Phylum: Arthropoda
- Class: Insecta
- Order: Coleoptera
- Suborder: Polyphaga
- Family: Dermestidae
- Genus: Anthrenus
- Subgenus: Florilinus
- Species: A. flavidus

Binomial name
- Anthrenus flavidus Solsky, 1876

= Anthrenus flavidus =

Species of beetle

Anthrenus flavidus is a species of carpet beetle in the subgenus Florilinus of the genus Anthrenus, family Dermestidae. It is known from Central Asia, China (Gansu, Shaanxi, Sichuan, Xinjiang), Iran, Afghanistan, Russia, the Caucasus region, Turkey and Cyprus. It has been introduced to Austria, Germany, and Poland.

Range of color variation present in female beetles
Pattern is visible	Fully covered in light setae
