= Anthrenus aristophanousi =

Scientific classification
- Kingdom: Animalia
- Phylum: Arthropoda
- Clade: Pancrustacea
- Class: Insecta
- Order: Coleoptera
- Suborder: Polyphaga
- Family: Dermestidae
- Genus: Anthrenus
- Subgenus: Anthrenops
- Species: A. aristophanousi

Binomial name
- Anthrenus aristophanousi Háva & Matsumoto, 2022

Species of beetle

Anthrenus (Anthrenops) aristophanousi is a species of carpet beetle found in Angola and Gabon.
