= Anthrenus zebra =

Scientific classification
- Kingdom: Animalia
- Phylum: Arthropoda
- Class: Insecta
- Order: Coleoptera
- Suborder: Polyphaga
- Family: Dermestidae
- Genus: Anthrenus
- Subgenus: Anthrenops
- Species: A. zebra

Binomial name
- Anthrenus zebra Reitter, 1889

Species of beetle

Anthrenus zebra is a species of carpet beetle in the family Dermestidae. It is known from Armenia, Azerbaijan, Russia (Southwest), Turkey, Afghanistan, Iran, and Turkmenistan.
