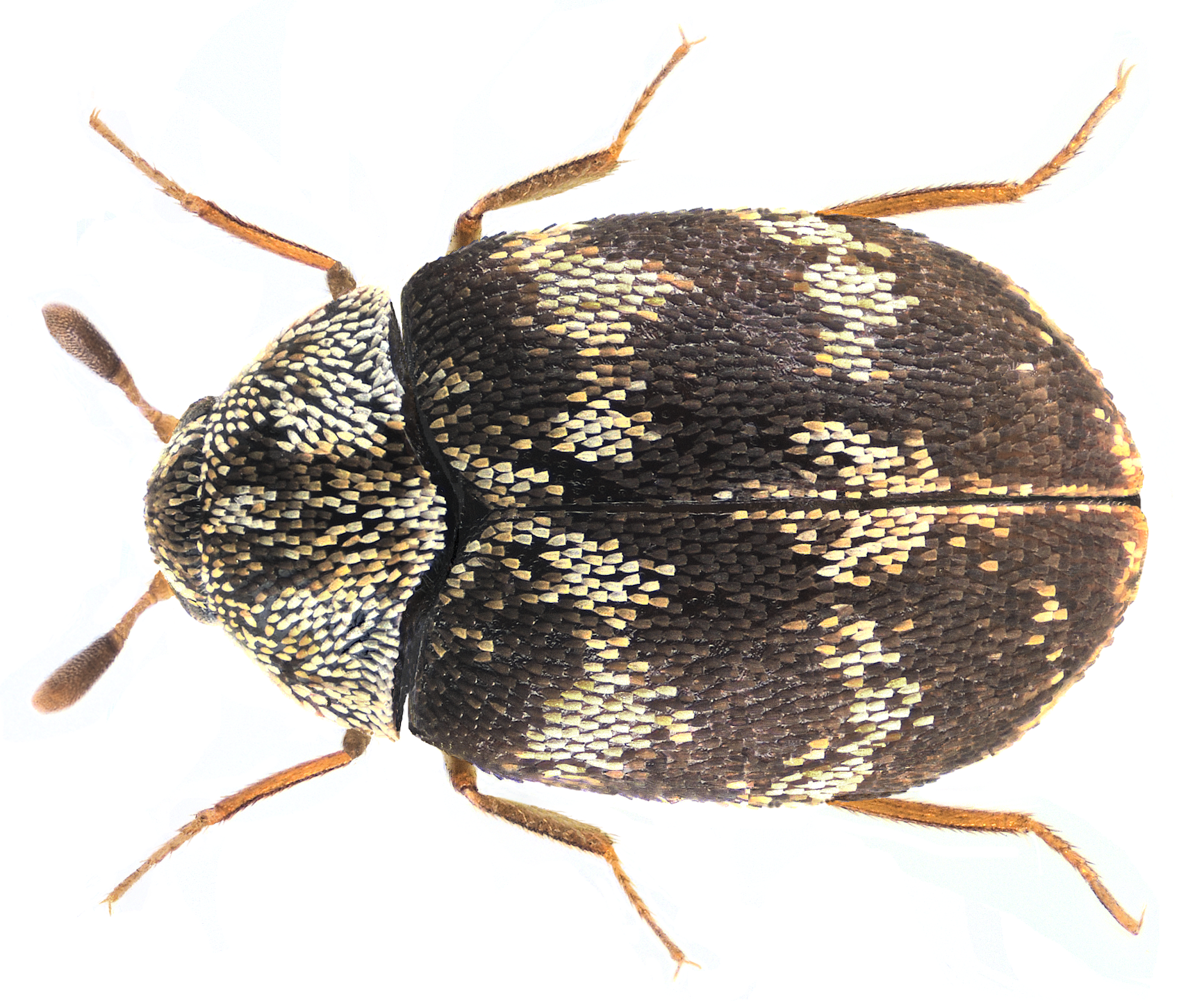

Scientific classification
- Kingdom: Animalia
- Phylum: Arthropoda
- Class: Insecta
- Order: Coleoptera
- Suborder: Polyphaga
- Family: Dermestidae
- Genus: Anthrenus
- Subgenus: Florilinus
- Species: A. caucasicus

Binomial name
- Anthrenus caucasicus Reitter, 1881

Synonyms
- Anthrenus armeniacus Zaitzev, 1919

= Anthrenus caucasicus =

Species of beetle

Anthrenus caucasicus is a species of carpet beetle in the subgenus Florilinus of the genus Anthrenus, family Dermestidae. It is known from the Caucasus region (including Armenia and Georgia), Iran, and Turkmenistan. It has been introduced to Austria, Latvia, Poland, and Slovakia.
