= Anthrenus dsungaricus =

Scientific classification
- Kingdom: Animalia
- Phylum: Arthropoda
- Class: Insecta
- Order: Coleoptera
- Suborder: Polyphaga
- Family: Dermestidae
- Genus: Anthrenus
- Subgenus: Solskinus
- Species: A. dsungaricus

Binomial name
- Anthrenus dsungaricus Mroczkowski, 1962

Species of beetle

Anthrenus (Solskinus) dsungaricus is a species of carpet beetle in the family Dermestidae. It is known from Eastern Kazakhstan and Kyrgyzstan. Records indicate the species is found in the hills north of Lake Issyk-Kul in Kyrgyzstan.

The species Anthrenus dsungaricus can often be mistaken for Anthrenus sogdianus due to subtle visual differences, but it is distinguishable by the presence of a transverse stripe of light scales on the elytral disc. Both species are also related to Anthrenus beali, however the elytral background of this species is predominantly composed from brown scales (as opposed to yellow).
