= Anthrenus ornatus =

Scientific classification
- Kingdom: Animalia
- Phylum: Arthropoda
- Class: Insecta
- Order: Coleoptera
- Suborder: Polyphaga
- Family: Dermestidae
- Genus: Anthrenus
- Subgenus: Anthrenops
- Species: A. ornatus

Binomial name
- Anthrenus ornatus Kocher, 1955

Synonyms
- Anthrenus bellulus ornatus Mroczkowski, 1964

Species of beetle

Anthrenus (Anthrenops) ornatus is a species of carpet beetle found in Spain and Morocco. It was previously considered a subspecies of Anthrenus bellulus.
