= Orphilus subnitidus =

Scientific classification
- Domain: Eukaryota
- Kingdom: Animalia
- Phylum: Arthropoda
- Class: Insecta
- Order: Coleoptera
- Suborder: Polyphaga
- Family: Dermestidae
- Genus: Orphilus
- Species: O. subnitidus

Binomial name
- Orphilus subnitidus LeConte, 1861

Species of beetle

Orphilus subnitidus is a species of carpet beetle in the family Dermestidae. It is found in North America.
