= Anthrenus tadzhicus =

Scientific classification
- Kingdom: Animalia
- Phylum: Arthropoda
- Class: Insecta
- Order: Coleoptera
- Suborder: Polyphaga
- Family: Dermestidae
- Genus: Anthrenus
- Subgenus: Solskinus
- Species: A. tadzhicus

Binomial name
- Anthrenus tadzhicus Mroczkowski, 1961

Species of beetle

Anthrenus (Solskinus) tadzhicus is a species of carpet beetle in the family Dermestidae. It is known from Russia (Dagestan) and Tajikistan.
