= Anthrenus bellulus =

Scientific classification
- Kingdom: Animalia
- Phylum: Arthropoda
- Class: Insecta
- Order: Coleoptera
- Suborder: Polyphaga
- Family: Dermestidae
- Genus: Anthrenus
- Subgenus: Anthrenops
- Species: A. bellulus

Binomial name
- Anthrenus bellulus Chobaut, 1897

Species of beetle

Anthrenus (Anthrenops) bellulus is a species of carpet beetle found in Algeria.

== See also ==
- Anthrenus ornatus (previously Anthrenus bellulus ornatus)
