= Anthrenus bobo =

Scientific classification
- Kingdom: Animalia
- Phylum: Arthropoda
- Class: Insecta
- Order: Coleoptera
- Suborder: Polyphaga
- Family: Dermestidae
- Genus: Anthrenus
- Subgenus: Anthrenops
- Species: A. bobo

Binomial name
- Anthrenus bobo Háva, 2003

Species of beetle

Anthrenus (Anthrenops) bobo is a species of carpet beetle found in Burkina Faso.
