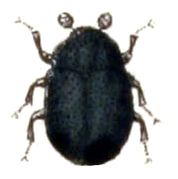
- Orphilus niger

Scientific classification
- Kingdom: Animalia
- Phylum: Arthropoda
- Clade: Pancrustacea
- Class: Insecta
- Order: Coleoptera
- Suborder: Polyphaga
- Family: Dermestidae
- Subfamily: Orphilinae
- Tribe: Orphilini; J. L. LeConte, 1861
- Genus: Orphilus; Erichson, 1846

= Orphilus =

Genus of beetles

Orphilus is a genus of beetles native to the Palearctic (including Europe), the Near East and North America. It contains the following species:

- Orphilus aegeanus Holloway and Herrmann, 2023
- Orphilus africanus Háva, 2005
- Orphilus ater Erichson, 1848
- Orphilus beali Zhantiev, 2001
- Orphilus dubius Wickham, 1912
- Orphilus niger (Rossi, 1790)
- Orphilus subnitidus LeConte, 1861
