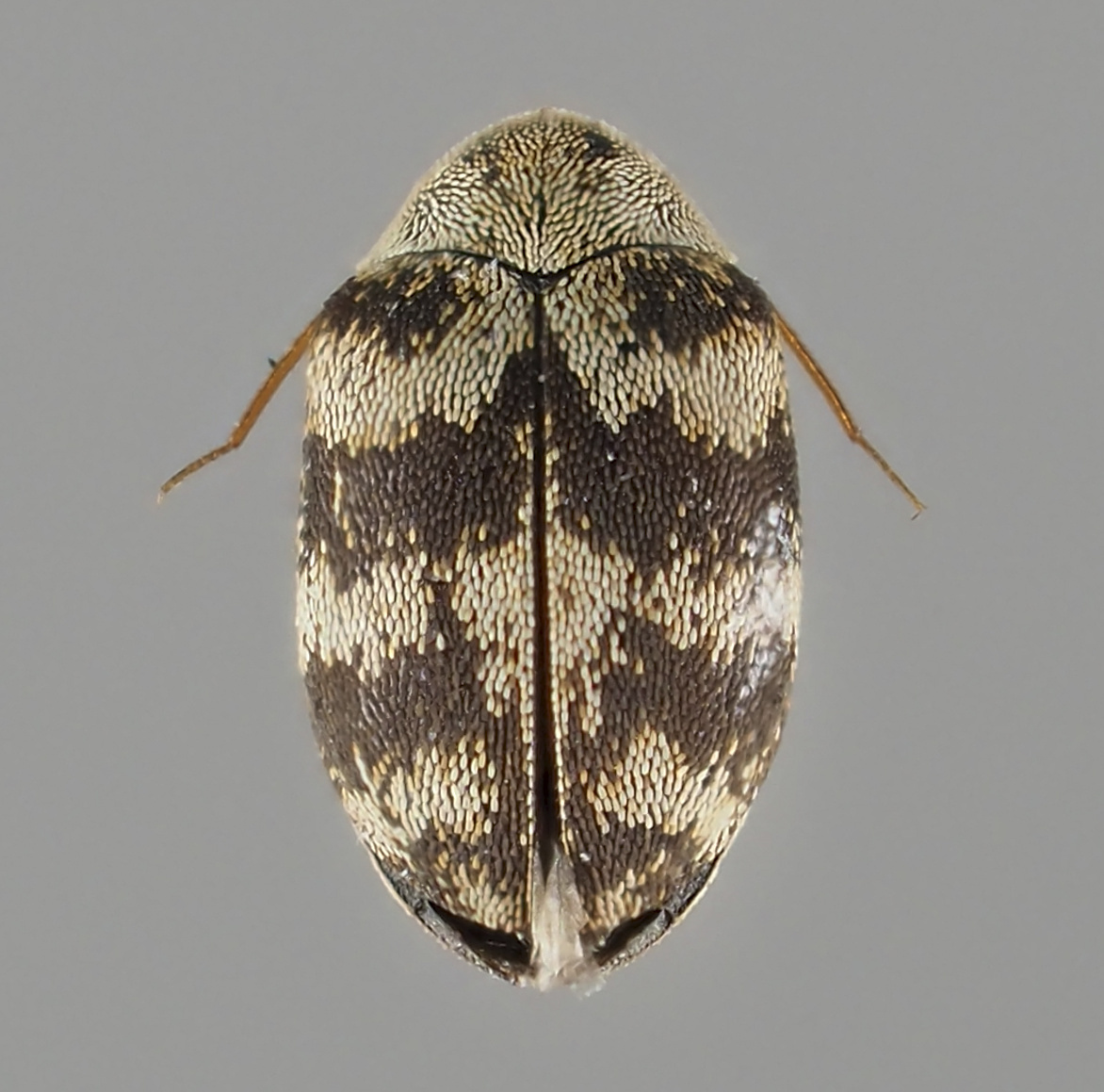

Scientific classification
- Kingdom: Animalia
- Phylum: Arthropoda
- Class: Insecta
- Order: Coleoptera
- Suborder: Polyphaga
- Family: Dermestidae
- Genus: Anthrenus
- Subgenus: Florilinus
- Species: A. olgae

Binomial name
- Anthrenus olgae Kalík, 1946

= Anthrenus olgae =

Species of beetle

Anthrenus olgae is a species of carpet beetle in the subgenus Florilinus of the genus Anthrenus, family Dermestidae. It is known from Europe in countries such as Austria, Bulgaria, Cyprus, Czech Republic, United Kingdom, Finland, Germany, Hungary, Latvia, Montenegro, Netherlands, Poland, Russia (Astrakhan, Kalmykia), Slovakia, Sweden and Ukraine. It has been introduced to Canada.
