= Anthrenus hartmanni =

Scientific classification
- Kingdom: Animalia
- Phylum: Arthropoda
- Class: Insecta
- Order: Coleoptera
- Suborder: Polyphaga
- Family: Dermestidae
- Genus: Anthrenus
- Subgenus: Florilinus
- Species: A. hartmanni

Binomial name
- Anthrenus hartmanni Háva, 2000

Species of beetle

Anthrenus (Florilinus) hartmanni is a species of carpet beetle found in India (Uttar Pradesh) and Nepal.
