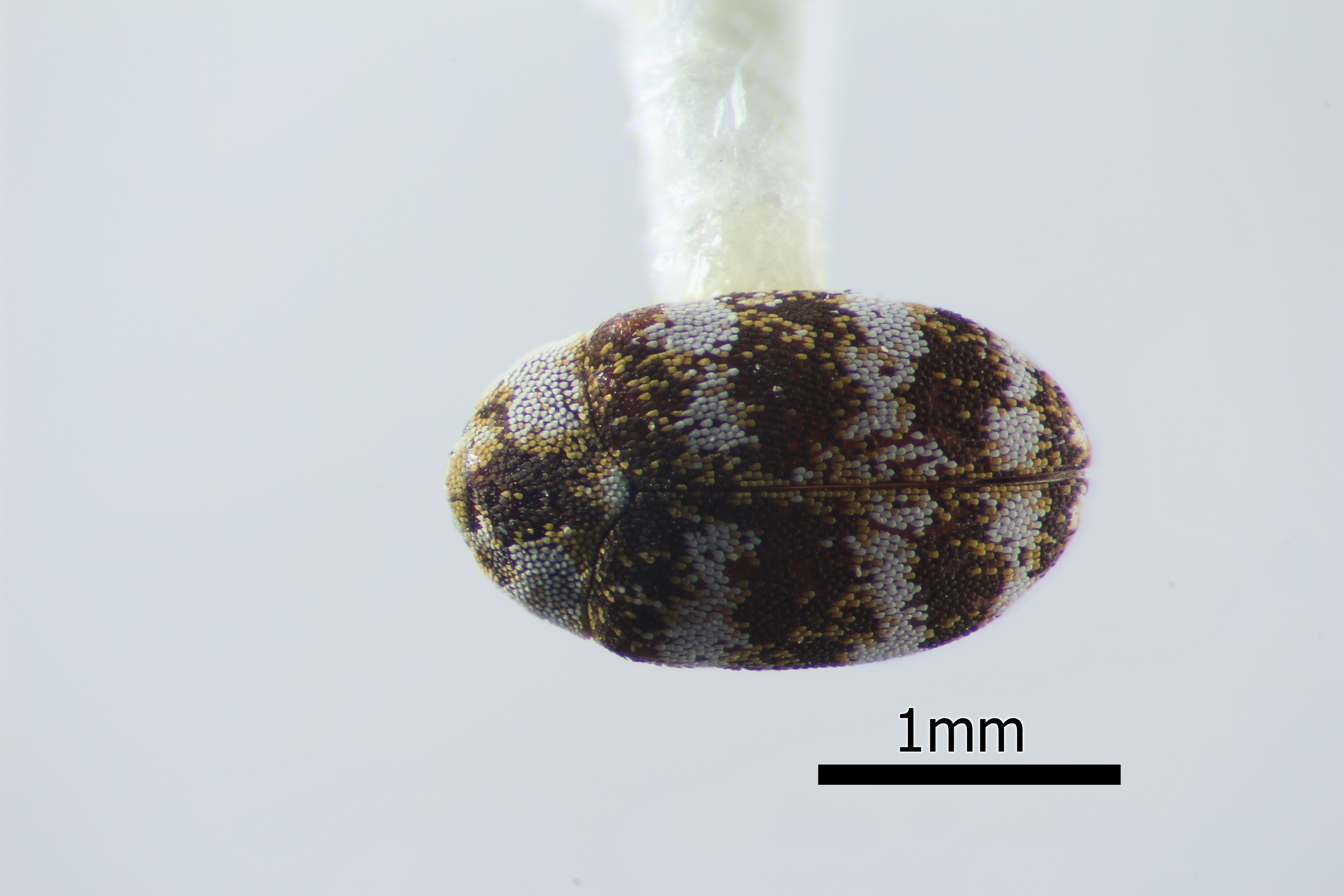
- Dorsal view

Scientific classification
- Kingdom: Animalia
- Phylum: Arthropoda
- Class: Insecta
- Order: Coleoptera
- Suborder: Polyphaga
- Family: Dermestidae
- Genus: Anthrenus
- Subgenus: Anthrenops
- Species: A. coloratus

Binomial name
- Anthrenus coloratus Reitter, 1881

= Anthrenus coloratus =

Species of beetle

Anthrenus coloratus, the Asian carpet beetle, is a beetle species in the family Dermestidae. It is known from Asia, Europe, Africa, North America (Mexico, United States) and it has been introduced in Ecuador.
