= Anthrenus pallidus =

Scientific classification
- Kingdom: Animalia
- Phylum: Arthropoda
- Class: Insecta
- Order: Coleoptera
- Suborder: Polyphaga
- Family: Dermestidae
- Genus: Anthrenus
- Subgenus: Florilinus
- Species: A. pallidus

Binomial name
- Anthrenus pallidus Sokolov, 1974

Species of beetle

Anthrenus pallidus is a species of carpet beetle in the family Dermestidae. It is known from Tajikistan.
