= Anthrenus qinlingensis =

Scientific classification
- Kingdom: Animalia
- Phylum: Arthropoda
- Class: Insecta
- Order: Coleoptera
- Suborder: Polyphaga
- Family: Dermestidae
- Genus: Anthrenus
- Subgenus: Florilinus
- Species: A. qinlingensis

Binomial name
- Anthrenus qinlingensis Háva, 2004

Species of beetle

Anthrenus (Florilinus) qinlingensis is a species of carpet beetle native to Shanxi, China.
