= Anthrenus ohbayashii =

Scientific classification
- Kingdom: Animalia
- Phylum: Arthropoda
- Class: Insecta
- Order: Coleoptera
- Suborder: Polyphaga
- Family: Dermestidae
- Genus: Anthrenus
- Subgenus: Florilinus
- Species: A. ohbayashii

Binomial name
- Anthrenus ohbayashii Kadej, Háva & Kitano, 2016

Species of beetle

Anthrenus (Florilinus) ohbayashii is a species of carpet beetle native to Taiwan.
