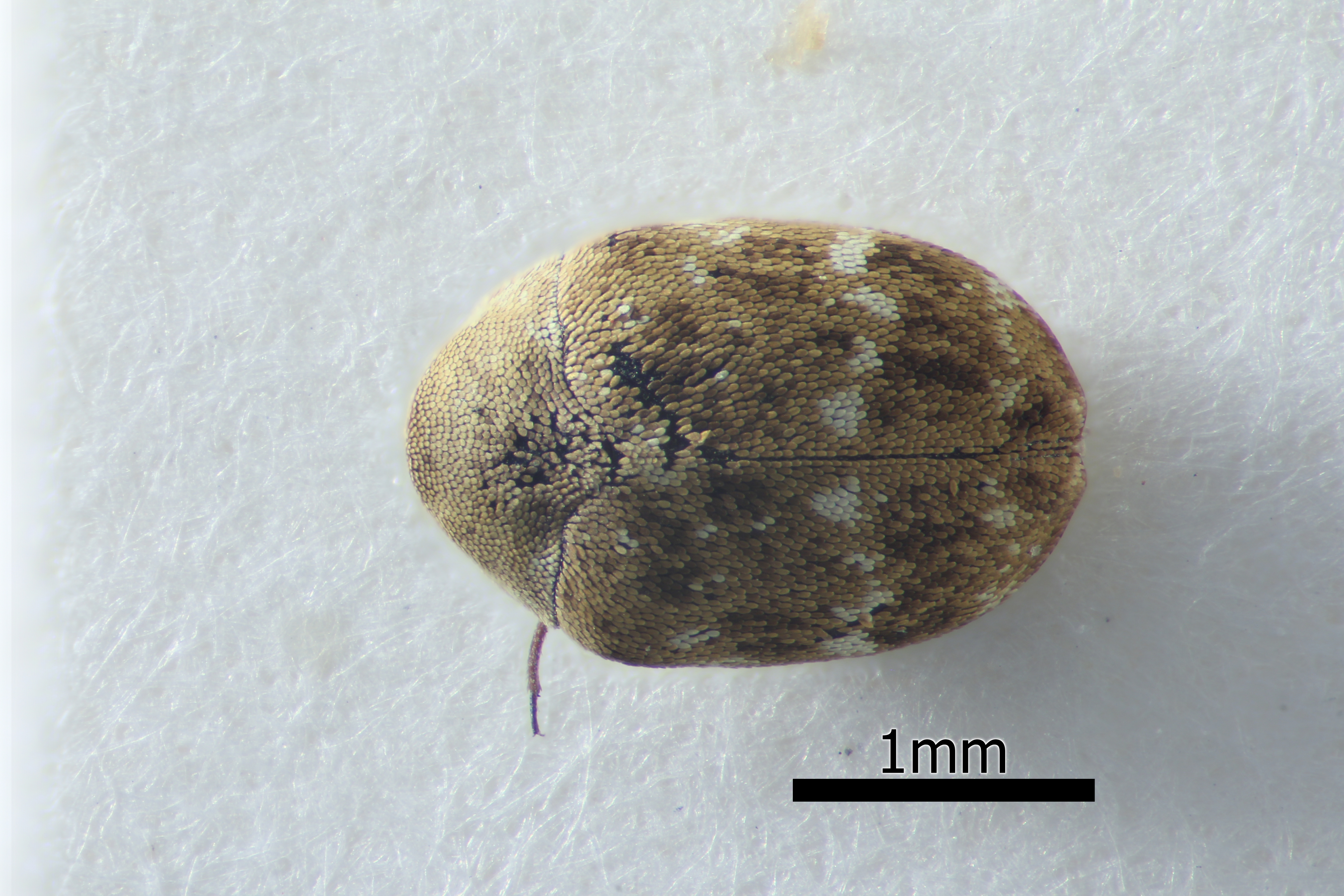

Scientific classification
- Kingdom: Animalia
- Phylum: Arthropoda
- Class: Insecta
- Order: Coleoptera
- Suborder: Polyphaga
- Family: Dermestidae
- Genus: Anthrenus
- Subgenus: Anthrenus
- Species: A. senegalensis

Binomial name
- Anthrenus senegalensis Pic, 1927

= Anthrenus senegalensis =

Species of beetle

Anthrenus senegalensis is a species of carpet beetle in the family Dermestidae. It is known from Benin, Gambia, Guinea Bissau, Senegal, Sierra Leone, and Togo.

== See also ==
Other Anthrenus species of Gambia:

- Anthrenus danielssoni
