= Anthrenus kourili =

Scientific classification
- Kingdom: Animalia
- Phylum: Arthropoda
- Class: Insecta
- Order: Coleoptera
- Suborder: Polyphaga
- Family: Dermestidae
- Genus: Anthrenus
- Subgenus: Florilinus
- Species: A. kourili

Binomial name
- Anthrenus kourili Háva, 2006

Species of beetle

Anthrenus (Florilinus) kourili is a species of carpet beetle found in Bulgaria.
