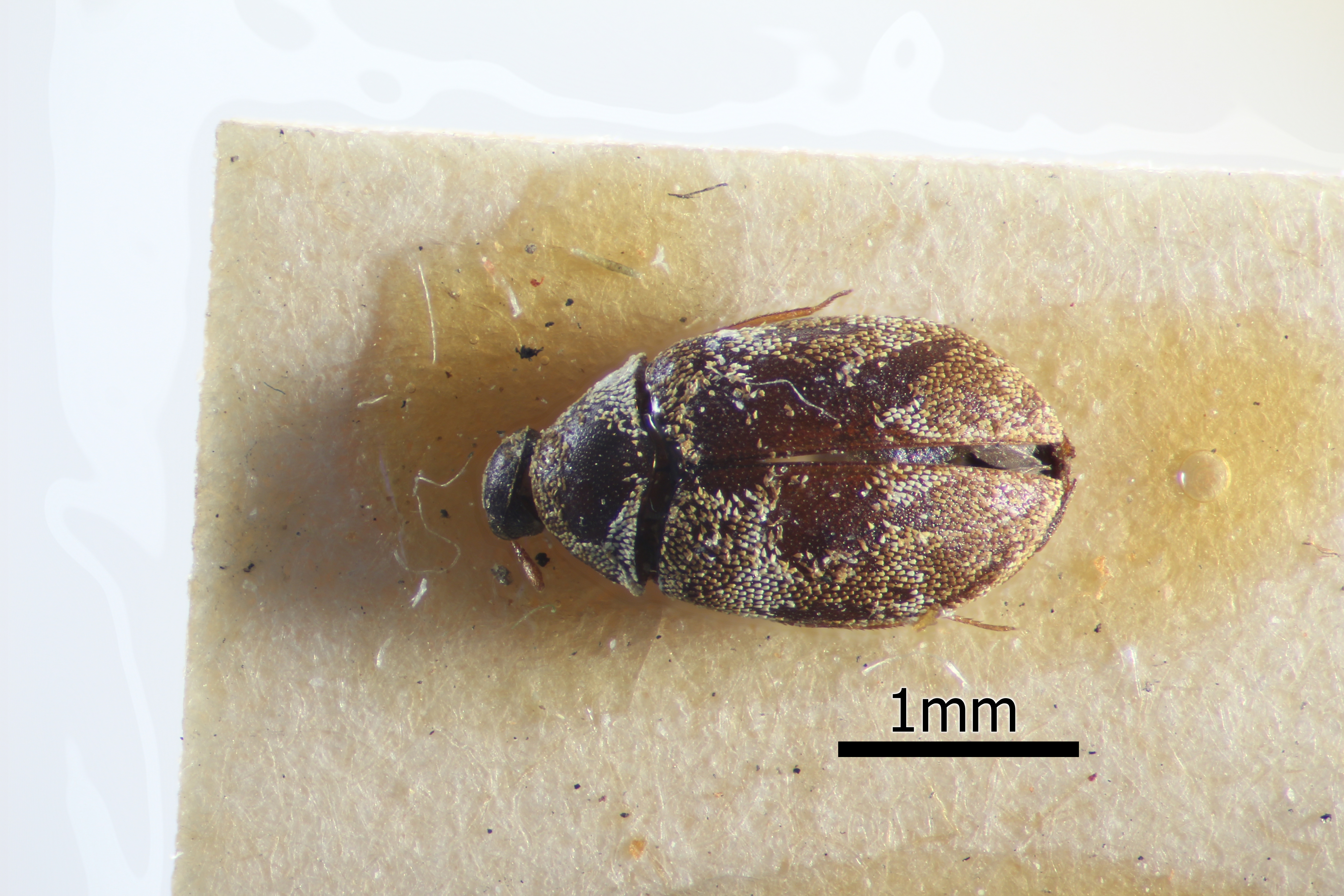

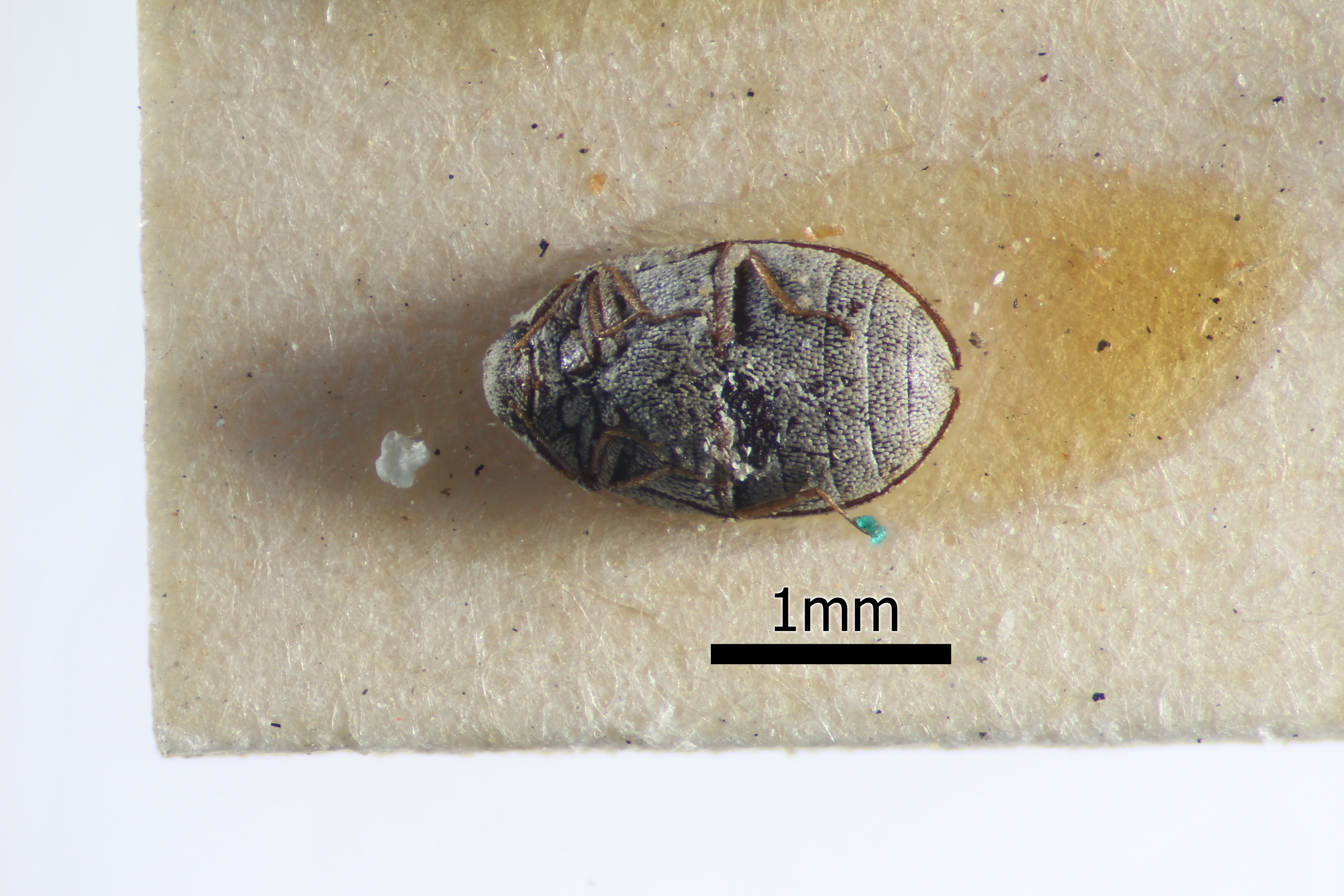

Scientific classification
- Kingdom: Animalia
- Phylum: Arthropoda
- Class: Insecta
- Order: Coleoptera
- Suborder: Polyphaga
- Family: Dermestidae
- Genus: Anthrenus
- Subgenus: Solskinus
- Species: A. sinensis

Binomial name
- Anthrenus sinensis Arrow, 1915

= Anthrenus sinensis =

Species of beetle

Anthrenus (Solskinus) sinensis is a species of carpet beetle in the subgenus Solskinus of the genus Anthrenus, family Dermestidae. It is known from Northern China, Northern India, and Russia (Primorskiy Kray).
