= Anthrenus shikokensis =

Scientific classification
- Kingdom: Animalia
- Phylum: Arthropoda
- Class: Insecta
- Order: Coleoptera
- Suborder: Polyphaga
- Family: Dermestidae
- Genus: Anthrenus
- Subgenus: Florilinus
- Species: A. shikokensis

Binomial name
- Anthrenus shikokensis Ohbayashi, 1985

Species of beetle

Anthrenus (Florilinus) shikokensis is a species of carpet beetle native to Shikoku Island, Japan.
