= Rustem Zhantiev =

Russian scientist (1937–2026)

- Рустем Жантиев
- Born: 11 October 1937; Yalta, Crimean ASSR, Russian SFSR, Soviet Union
- Died: 5 August 2026 (aged 88)
- Education: Moscow State University (1960)
- Occupation: Scientist

Rustem Devletovich Zhantiev Dn (Russian: Рустем Девлетович Жантиев; 11 October 1937 – 5 August 2026) was a Russian Crimean Tatar scientist, specialising in the fields of the systematics, ecology and physiology of insect acoustic communication, orientation, and neurophysiology.

== Life and career ==
In 1960 he graduated from Department of Entomology in the Biological Faculty of Moscow State University. From 1960 to 1963 he worked in the Post-graduate Department of Entomology and from 1963 to the present he has worked at Moscow State University. In 1966 he wrote his thesis The taxonomic and ecological analysis of Sem. Dermestidae (Coleoptera) and in 1980 his PhD on insect bioacoustics.

In 1982 he became a professor, giving lectures and seminars on insect physiology, Coleoptera, the Principles of Zoological Systematics and the modern problems and methods of entomology. He became a laureate of the USSR State Prize in 1987, the same year as he was given the Medal "Veteran of Labour". Since 1990 he has been the head of the Department of Entomology in the Faculty of Biology at Moscow State University, where he became an Emeritus Professor in 1998. In 1997 he was given the Medal "In Commemoration of the 850th Anniversary of Moscow" and in 2002 he was made an Honoured Worker of the Higher Schools of the Russian Federation.

Zhantiev died on 5 August 2026, at the age of 88.

== Awards ==
- USSR State Prize (1987)
- Medal "Veteran of Labour" (1987)
- Medal "In Commemoration of the 850th Anniversary of Moscow" (1997)

== Major works ==
Zhantiev wrote over 100 works, including:

=== Books ===
- Жуки-кожееды (семейство Dermestidae) фауны СССР. Kozheedy Beetles (family Dermestidae) fauna of the USSR. Издательство Московского университета, 1976. Moscow University Publishing House, 1976.
- Биоакустика насекомых. Bioacoustics insects. Издательство Московского университета, 1981. Moscow University Publishing House, 1981.
- 2005. Кафедра энтомологии Московского государственного университета. М.: Т-во научных изданий КМК. Zhantiev RD, Gull S., Ryazanov, GI, Farafonova GV Ahaev DN, Benediktov AA, 2005. Department of Entomology, Moscow State University. MM: Association of KMK Scientific Press. 137 с. 137.

=== Articles ===
- 2001. Личинки жуков-кожеедов рода Dermestes (Coleoptera, Dermestidae) России и сопредельных стран. Zhantiev RD, 2001. The larvae of beetles, carpet beetle genus Dermestes (Coleoptera, Dermestidae) of Russia and neighboring countries. Подрод Montandonia // Зоол. Subgenus Montandonia / / Zool. журн. Journ. Т. 80. T. 80. № 3. № 3. С. 371–375. S. 371–375.
- 2001. Жуки-кожееды рода Orphilus Er. Zhantiev RD, 2001. Beetles kozheedy kind Orphilus Er. (Coleoptera, Dermestidae) фауны Палеарктик и // Энтомол. (Coleoptera, Dermestidae) and Palaearctic / / Entomol. обоз. carts. Т. 80. T. 80. № 3. № 3. С. 611–619. S. 611–619.
- 2002. Новые и малоизученные кожееды (Coleoptera, Dermestidae) из Закавказья // Зоол. Zhantiev RD, 2002. New and lesser known kozheedy (Coleoptera, Dermestidae) from the Caucasus, Zool. журн. Journ. Т. 81. T. 81. № 3. № 3. С. 369–372. S. 369–372.
- 2007. Спонтанная активность интернейронов кузнечиков (Orthoptera, Tettigoniidue) при разной температуре // Проблемы и перспективы общей энтомологии. Zhantiev RD, Chukanov VS Korsunovskaya OS, 2007. Spontaneous activity of interneurons of grasshoppers (Orthoptera, Tettigoniidue) at different temperatures: Problems and prospects of general entomology. Тезисы докладов XIII съезда РЭО, Краснодар, 9–15 сентября 2007 г. С. 112–113. Abstracts XIII Congress of the RER, Krasnodar, 9–15 September 2007 S. 112–113.
- 2007. Реакции на звук слуховых рецепторов кузнечиков (Orthoptera, Tettigoniidae) при разной температуре // Проблемы и перспективы общей энтомологии. Korsunovskaya OS, Zhantiev RD, 2007. Reactions to the sound of auditory receptors of grasshoppers (Orthoptera, Tettigoniidae) at different temperatures: Problems and prospects of general entomology. Тезисы докладов XIII съезда РЭО, Краснодар, 9–15 сентября 2007 г. С. 166. Abstracts XIII Congress of the RER, Krasnodar, 9–15 September 2007 S. 166.
