= List of Hydraena species =

This is a list of 924 species in Hydraena, a genus of minute moss beetles in the family Hydraenidae.

== Hydraena species ==
- Hydraena abbasigili Jäch, 1988^{i c g}
- Hydraena abdita Orchymont, 1948^{i c g}
- Hydraena abyssinica Régimbart, 1905^{i c g}
- Hydraena accurata Orchymont, 1948^{i c g}
- Hydraena achaica Jäch, 1995^{i c g}
- Hydraena acumena Perkins, 2011^{i c g}
- Hydraena adelbertensis Perkins, 2011^{i c g}
- Hydraena adrastea Orchymont, 1948^{i c g}
- Hydraena aethaliensis Breit, 1917^{i c g}
- Hydraena affirmata Perkins, 2007^{i c g}
- Hydraena affusa Orchymont, 1936^{i c g}
- Hydraena africana Kuwert, 1888^{i c g}
- Hydraena akameku Perkins, 2011^{i c g}
- Hydraena akbesiana Audisio, De Biase and Jäch, 1993^{i c g}
- Hydraena albai Sáinz-Cantero, 1993^{i c g}
- Hydraena alberti Balfour-Browne, 1950^{i c g}
- Hydraena alcantarana Ienistea, 1985^{i c g}
- Hydraena algerina Kaddouri, 1992^{i c g}
- Hydraena alia Orchymont, 1934^{i c g}
- Hydraena aliciae Jäch and Díaz, 2005^{i c g}
- Hydraena allomorpha Lagar and Fresneda, 1990^{i c g}
- Hydraena alluaudi Régimbart, 1906^{i c g}
- Hydraena alpicola Pretner, 1931^{i c g}
- Hydraena altamirensis Díaz Pazos and Garrido Gonzalez, 1993^{i c g}
- Hydraena altapapua Perkins, 2011^{i c g}
- Hydraena alternata Perkins, 1980^{i c g}
- Hydraena alterra Perkins, 1980^{i c g}
- Hydraena alticola Skale and Jäch, 2008^{i c g}
- Hydraena altiphila Perkins, 2011^{i c g}
- Hydraena amazonica Perkins, 2011^{i c g}
- Hydraena ambiflagellata Zwick, 1977^{i c g}
- Hydraena ambigua Ganglbauer, 1901^{i c g}
- Hydraena ambiosina Perkins, 2007^{i c g}
- Hydraena ambra Perkins, 2011^{i c g}
- Hydraena ambripes Perkins, 2011^{i c g}
- Hydraena ambroides Perkins, 2011^{i c g}
- Hydraena americana Jäch, 1993^{i c g}
- Hydraena amidensis Jäch, 1988^{i c g}
- Hydraena ampla Perkins, 2011^{i c g}
- Hydraena anaphora Perkins, 1980^{i c g}
- Hydraena anatolica Janssens, 1963^{i c}
- Hydraena ancylis Perkins, 1980^{i c g}
- Hydraena ancyrae Jäch, 1992^{i c g}
- Hydraena andalusa Lagar and Fresneda, 1990^{i c g}
- Hydraena andreinii Orchymont, 1934^{i c g}
- Hydraena angulicollis Notman, 1921^{i c g b}
- Hydraena angulosa Mulsant, 1844^{i c g}
- Hydraena angustata Sturm, 1836^{i c g}
- Hydraena anisonycha Perkins, 1980^{i c g}
- Hydraena antaria Perkins, 2007^{i c g}
- Hydraena antiatlantica Jäch, Aguilera and Hernando, 1998^{i c g}
- Hydraena antiochena Jäch, 1988^{i c g}
- Hydraena apertista Perkins, 2011^{i c g}
- Hydraena apexa Perkins, 2011^{i c g}
- Hydraena appalachicola Perkins, 1980^{i c g}
- Hydraena appetita Perkins, 2007^{i c g}
- Hydraena aquila Perkins, 2011^{i c g}
- Hydraena arabica Balfour-Browne, 1951^{i c g}
- Hydraena arachthi Ferro and Jäch, 2000^{i c g}
- Hydraena arcta Perkins, 2007^{i c g}
- Hydraena arenicola Perkins, 1980^{i c g}
- Hydraena argutipes Perkins, 1980^{i c g}
- Hydraena ariana Janssens, 1962^{i c g}
- Hydraena arizonica Perkins, 1980^{i c g}
- Hydraena armata Reitter, 1880^{i c g}
- Hydraena armatura Perkins, 2014^{i c g}
- Hydraena armeniaca Janssens, 1968^{i c g}
- Hydraena armipalpis Jäch and Díaz, 2000^{i c g}
- Hydraena armipes Rey, 1886^{i c g}
- Hydraena aroensis (Ferro, 1991)^{i c g}
- Hydraena arunensis Skale and Jäch in Jäch and Skale, 2009^{i c g}
- Hydraena ascensa Perkins, 2007^{i c g}
- Hydraena assimilis Rey, 1885^{i c g}
- Hydraena ateneo Freitag, 2013^{i c g}
- Hydraena athertonica Perkins, 2007^{i c g}
- Hydraena atrata Desbrochers des Loges, 1891^{i c g}
- Hydraena atroscintilla Perkins, 2011^{i c g}
- Hydraena attaleiae Ferro, 1984^{i c g}
- Hydraena audisioi Jäch, 1992^{i c g}
- Hydraena aulaarta Perkins, 2011^{i c g}
- Hydraena aurita Jäch, 1988^{i c g}
- Hydraena australica Zwick, 1977^{i c g}
- Hydraena australula Perkins, 2007^{i c g}
- Hydraena austrobesa Perkins, 2011^{i c g}
- Hydraena avuncula Jäch, 1988^{i c g}
- Hydraena bacchusi Perkins, 2011^{i c g}
- Hydraena bactriana Janssens, 1962^{i c g}
- Hydraena bakriensis Skale and Jäch, 2011^{i c g}
- Hydraena balearica Orchymont, 1930^{i c g}
- Hydraena balfourbrownei Bameul, 1986^{i c g}
- Hydraena balkei Perkins, 2011^{i c g}
- Hydraena balli Orchymont, 1940^{i c g}
- Hydraena barbipes Zwick, 1977^{i c g}
- Hydraena barricula Perkins, 1980^{i c g}
- Hydraena barrosi Orchymont, 1934^{i c g}
- Hydraena bedeli Berthélemy, 1992^{i c g}
- Hydraena belgica Orchymont, 1930^{i c g}
- Hydraena beniensis Perkins, 2011^{i c g}
- Hydraena benjaminus Jäch and Díaz, 2006^{i c g}
- Hydraena bensae Ganglbauer, 1901^{i c g}
- Hydraena bergeri (Janssens, 1972)^{i c g}
- Hydraena berthelemyana Jäch, Díaz and Dia in Jäch, Dia and Díaz, 2006^{i c g}
- Hydraena berytus Jäch, 1986^{i c g}
- Hydraena beyarslani Jäch, 1988^{i c g}
- Hydraena bicarina Perkins, 2014^{i c g}
- Hydraena bicarinova Perkins, 2011^{i c g}
- Hydraena bicolorata Jäch, 1997^{i c g}
- Hydraena bicuspidata Ganglbauer, 1901^{i c g}
- Hydraena bidefensa Perkins, 2007^{i c g}
- Hydraena bifunda Perkins, 2011^{i c g}
- Hydraena bihamata Champion, 1920^{i c g}
- Hydraena biimpressa Perkins, 2007^{i c g}
- Hydraena billi Zwick, 1977^{i c g}
- Hydraena bilobata Jäch and Díaz, 1998^{i c g}
- Hydraena biltoni Jäch and Díaz, 2012^{i c g}
- Hydraena bimagua Jäch, 1986^{i c g}
- Hydraena birendra Skale and Jäch in Jäch and Skale, 2009^{i c g}
- Hydraena biseptosa Perkins, 2014^{i c g}
- Hydraena bispinosa Pu, 1951^{i c g}
- Hydraena bisulcata Rey, 1884^{i c g}
- Hydraena bitruncata Orchymont, 1934^{i c g}
- Hydraena bituberculata Perkins, 1980^{i c g}
- Hydraena biundulata Perkins, 2011^{i c g}
- Hydraena blackburni Zaitzev, 1908^{i c g}
- Hydraena bodemeyeri Jäch and Díaz, 2001^{i c g}
- Hydraena boetcheri Orchymont, 1932^{i c g}
- Hydraena bolivari Orchymont, 1936^{i c g}
- Hydraena boliviana Perkins, 2011^{i c g}
- Hydraena bononiensis Binaghi, 1960^{i c g}
- Hydraena borbonica Fairmaire, 1898^{i c g}
- Hydraena bosnica Apfelbeck, 1909^{i c g}
- Hydraena brachymera Orchymont, 1936^{i c g}
- Hydraena bractea Perkins, 1980^{i c g}
- Hydraena bractoides Perkins, 1980^{i c g}
- Hydraena brahmin Perkins, 2011^{i c g}
- Hydraena breedlovei Perkins, 1980^{i c g}
- Hydraena brevis Sharp, 1882^{i c g}
- Hydraena britteni Joy, 1907^{i c g}
- Hydraena brittoni Zwick, 1977^{i c g}
- Hydraena bromleyae Jäch, 1986^{i c g}
- Hydraena browni Perkins, 1980^{i c g}
- Hydraena bubulla Perkins, 2011^{i c g}
- Hydraena bulgarica Breit, 1916^{i c g}
- Hydraena buloba Perkins, 2011^{i c g}
- Hydraena buquintana Perkins, 2011^{i c g}
- Hydraena buschietanni Freitag, 2021^{i c g}
- Hydraena buscintilla Perkins, 2011^{i c g}
- Hydraena busuanga Freitag and Jäch, 2007^{i c g}
- Hydraena calcarifera Janssens, 1959^{i c g}
- Hydraena californica Perkins, 1980^{i c g}
- Hydraena campbelli Perkins, 1980^{i c g}
- Hydraena canakcioglui Janssens, 1965^{i c g}
- Hydraena canticacollis Perkins, 1980^{i c g}
- Hydraena capacis Perkins, 2007^{i c g}
- Hydraena capensis Perkins, 2014^{i c g}
- Hydraena capetribensis Perkins, 2007^{i c g}
- Hydraena cappadocica Jäch, 1988^{i c g}
- Hydraena caprivica Perkins, 2014^{i c g}
- Hydraena capta Orchymont, 1936^{i c g}
- Hydraena carbonaria Kiesenwetter, 1849^{i c g}
- Hydraena carica Jäch, 1988^{i c g}
- Hydraena carinocisiva Perkins, 2011^{i c g}
- Hydraena carinulata Rey, 1886^{i c g}
- Hydraena carmellita Perkins, 2011^{i c g}
- Hydraena carniolica Pretner, 1970^{i c g}
- Hydraena castanea Deane, 1937^{i c g}
- Hydraena castanescens Freitag and Jäch, 2007^{i c g}
- Hydraena cata Orchymont, 1936^{i c g}
- Hydraena catalonica Fresneda, Aguilera and Hernando, 1994^{i c g}
- Hydraena catherinae Bameul and Jäch, 2001^{i c g}
- Hydraena caucasica Kuwert, 1888^{i c g}
- Hydraena cavifrons Perkins, 2011^{i c g}
- Hydraena cephalleniaca Jäch, 1985^{i c g}
- Hydraena cervisophila Jäch, 1992^{i c g}
- Hydraena challeti Perkins, 2011^{i c g}
- Hydraena cheesmanae Perkins, 2011^{i c g}
- Hydraena chenae Pu, 1951^{i c g}
- Hydraena chersonesica Jäch, Díaz and Przewozny, 2007^{i c g}
- Hydraena cherylbarrae Perkins, 2011^{i c g}
- Hydraena chiapa Perkins, 1980^{i c g}
- Hydraena chiesai Janssens, 1965^{i c g}
- Hydraena chifengi Jäch and Díaz, 1999^{i c g}
- Hydraena chobauti Guillebeau, 1896^{i c g}
- Hydraena christinae Audisio, De Biase and Jäch, 1996^{i c g}
- Hydraena christoferi Jäch and Díaz, 2005^{i c g}
- Hydraena ciliciensis Jäch, 1988^{i c g}
- Hydraena circulata Perkins, 1980^{i c g b}
- Hydraena cirrata Champion, 1920^{i c g}
- Hydraena clarinis Perkins, 2011^{i c g}
- Hydraena claudia Freitag and Jäch, 2007^{i c g}
- Hydraena clavicula Perkins, 2014^{i c g}
- Hydraena clavigera Zwick, 1977^{i c g}
- Hydraena clemens Jäch and Díaz, 2006^{i c g}
- Hydraena clinodorsa Perkins, 2011^{i c g}
- Hydraena clystera Perkins, 2011^{i c g}
- Hydraena cochabamba Perkins, 2011^{i c g}
- Hydraena colchica Janssens, 1963^{i c g}
- Hydraena colombiana Perkins, 1980^{i c g}
- Hydraena colorata Perkins, 2011^{i c g}
- Hydraena colymba Perkins, 1980^{i c g}
- Hydraena compressipilis Jäch and Díaz, 1998^{i c g}
- Hydraena concepcionica Perkins, 2011^{i c g}
- Hydraena concinna Orchymont, 1932^{i c g}
- Hydraena confluenta Perkins, 2011^{i c g}
- Hydraena confusa Pu, 1951^{i c g}
- Hydraena connexa Orchymont, 1932^{i c g}
- Hydraena converga Perkins, 2007^{i c g}
- Hydraena coomani Orchymont, 1932^{i c g}
- Hydraena cooperi Balfour-Browne, 1954^{i c g}
- Hydraena cooperoides Perkins, 2014^{i c g}
- Hydraena copulata Perkins, 2011^{i c g}
- Hydraena cordata Schaufuss, 1883^{i c g}
- Hydraena cordiformis Jäch and Díaz, 2000^{i c g}
- Hydraena cordispina Perkins, 2011^{i c g}
- Hydraena corinna Orchymont, 1936^{i c g}
- Hydraena cornelli Jäch and Díaz, 1998^{i c g}
- Hydraena corrugis Orchymont, 1934^{i c g}
- Hydraena coryleti Jäch, 1992^{i c g}
- Hydraena costiniceps Perkins, 1980^{i c g}
- Hydraena crepidoptera Jäch, 1992^{i c g}
- Hydraena cristatigena Jäch and Díaz, 2000^{i c g}
- Hydraena croatica Kuwert, 1888^{i c g}
- Hydraena cryptostoma Jäch, 1992^{i c g}
- Hydraena crystallina Perkins, 1980^{i c g}
- Hydraena cubista Perkins, 2007^{i c g}
- Hydraena cultrata Perkins, 2007^{i c g}
- Hydraena cunicula Perkins, 2011^{i c g}
- Hydraena cunninghamensis Perkins, 2007^{i c g}
- Hydraena curta Kiesenwetter, 1849^{i c g}
- Hydraena curtipalpis Jäch and Díaz, 1998^{i c g}
- Hydraena curvipes Jäch and Díaz, 2012^{i c g}
- Hydraena curvosa Perkins, 2011^{i c g}
- Hydraena cuspidicollis Perkins, 1980^{i c g}
- Hydraena cyclops Jäch and Díaz, 2000^{i c g}
- Hydraena cygnus Zwick, 1977^{i c g}
- Hydraena czernohorskyi Müller, 1911^{i c g}
- Hydraena dalmatina Ganglbauer, 1901^{i c g}
- Hydraena damascena Pic, 1910^{i c g}
- Hydraena dariensis Perkins, 2011^{i c g}
- Hydraena darwini Perkins, 2007^{i c g}
- Hydraena d-concava Perkins, 2011^{i c g}
- Hydraena d-destina Perkins, 1980^{i c g}
- Hydraena debeckeri (Janssens, 1972)^{i c g}
- Hydraena decepta Perkins, 2011^{i c g}
- Hydraena decipiens Zwick, 1977^{i c g}
- Hydraena decolor Sainte-Claire Deville, 1903^{i c g}
- Hydraena decui Spangler, 1980^{i c g}
- Hydraena delia Balfour-Browne, 1978^{i c g}
- Hydraena deliquesca Perkins, 2007^{i c g}
- Hydraena delvasi Delgado and Collantes, 1996^{i c g}
- Hydraena densa Fauvel, 1883^{i c g}
- Hydraena dentipalpis Reitter, 1888^{i c g}
- Hydraena dentipes Germar, 1824^{i c g}
- Hydraena devillei Ganglbauer, 1901^{i c g}
- Hydraena devincta Orchymont, 1940^{i c g}
- Hydraena diadema Perkins, 2011^{i c g}
- Hydraena diazi Trizzino, Jäch and Ribera in Trizzino, Jäch, Audisio and Rivera, 2011^{i c g}
- Hydraena diffusa Perkins, 2011^{i c g}
- Hydraena dilutipes Fairmaire, 1898^{i c g}
- Hydraena dimorpha Orchymont, 1922^{i c g}
- Hydraena dinosaurophila Jäch, 1994^{i c g}
- Hydraena discicollis Fairmaire, 1898^{i c g}
- Hydraena discreta Ganglbauer, 1904^{i c g}
- Hydraena disparamera Perkins, 2007^{i c g}
- Hydraena dochula Skale and Jäch in Jäch and Skale, 2009^{i c g}
- Hydraena dolichogaster Janssens, 1965^{i c g}
- Hydraena dorrigoensis Perkins, 2007^{i c g}
- Hydraena draconisaurati Jäch and Díaz, 2005^{i c g}
- Hydraena dudgeoni Perkins, 2011^{i c g}
- Hydraena duodecimata Perkins, 2014^{i c g}
- Hydraena duohamata Perkins, 2011^{i c g}
- Hydraena ebriimadli Jäch, 1988^{i c g}
- Hydraena ecuadormica Perkins, 2011^{i c g}
- Hydraena egoni Jäch, 1986^{i c g}
- Hydraena eichleri Orchymont, 1937^{i c g}
- Hydraena einsteini Perkins, 2011^{i c g}
- Hydraena elephanta Perkins, 2014^{i c g}
- Hydraena elisabethae Jäch, 1992^{i c g}
- Hydraena eliya Jäch, 1982^{i c g}
- Hydraena emarginata Rey, 1885^{i c g}
- Hydraena emineae Jäch and Kasapoglu, 2006^{i c g}
- Hydraena epeirosi Ferro, 1985^{i c g}
- Hydraena errina Orchymont, 1948^{i c g}
- Hydraena erythraea Régimbart, 1905^{i c g}
- Hydraena eryx Orchymont, 1948^{i c g}
- Hydraena esquinita Brojer and Jäch, 2011^{i c g}
- Hydraena essentia Perkins, 2011^{i c g}
- Hydraena eucnemis Janssens, 1970^{i c g}
- Hydraena evanescens Rey, 1884^{i c g}
- Hydraena evansi Balfour-Browne, 1945^{i c g}
- Hydraena exarata Kiesenwetter, 1866^{i c g}
- Hydraena exasperata Orchymont, 1935^{i c g}
- Hydraena excisa Kiesenwetter, 1849^{i c g}
- Hydraena exhalista Perkins, 2011^{i c g}
- Hydraena exilipes Perkins, 1980^{i c g}
- Hydraena expedita Skale and Jäch in Jäch and Skale, 2009^{i c g}
- Hydraena explanata Pic, 1905^{i c g}
- Hydraena extorris Zwick, 1977^{i c g}
- Hydraena falcata Jäch, 1992^{i c g}
- Hydraena farsensis Skale and Jäch, 2011^{i c g}
- Hydraena fasciata Perkins, 2011^{i c g}
- Hydraena fascinata Perkins, 2011^{i c g}
- Hydraena fasciola Perkins, 2011^{i c g}
- Hydraena fasciolata Perkins, 2011^{i c g}
- Hydraena fasciopaca Perkins, 2011^{i c g}
- Hydraena favulosa Perkins, 2014^{i c g}
- Hydraena fenestella Perkins, 2011^{i c g}
- Hydraena ferethula Perkins, 2007^{i c g}
- Hydraena feryi Skale and Jäch, 2011^{i c g}
- Hydraena feuerborni Orchymont, 1932^{i c g}
- Hydraena fijiensis Balfour-Browne, 1945^{i c g}
- Hydraena filum Sahlberg, 1908^{i c g}
- Hydraena finita Orchymont, 1943^{i c g}
- Hydraena finki Skale and Jäch in Jäch and Skale, 2009^{i c g}
- Hydraena finniganensis Perkins, 2007^{i c g}
- Hydraena fiorii Porta, 1899^{i c g}
- Hydraena fischeri Schönmann, 1991^{i c g}
- Hydraena flagella Perkins, 2011^{i c g}
- Hydraena fluvicola (Perkins, 1980)^{i c g}
- Hydraena foliobba Perkins, 2011^{i c g}
- Hydraena fontana Orchymont, 1932^{i c g}
- Hydraena fontiscarsavii (Jäch, 1988)^{i c g}
- Hydraena formosapala Perkins, 2011^{i c g}
- Hydraena formula Orchymont, 1932^{i c g}
- Hydraena forticollis Perkins, 2007^{i c g}
- Hydraena fosterorum Trizzino, Jäch and Ribera in Trizzino, Jäch, Audisio and Rivera, 2011^{i c g}
- Hydraena franklyni Deler-Hernández and Delgado, 2012^{i c g}
- Hydraena freitagi Skale and Jäch in Jäch and Skale, 2009^{i c g}
- Hydraena frenzeli Skale and Jäch, 2008^{i c g}
- Hydraena fritzi Jäch, 1992^{i c g}
- Hydraena frondsicola (Perkins, 1980)^{i c g}
- Hydraena funda Perkins, 2011^{i c g}
- Hydraena fundacta Perkins, 2011^{i c g}
- Hydraena fundaequalis Perkins, 2007^{i c g}
- Hydraena fundapta Perkins, 2011^{i c g}
- Hydraena fundarca Perkins, 2011^{i c g}
- Hydraena fundata Perkins, 2007^{i c g}
- Hydraena fundextra Perkins, 2011^{i c g}
- Hydraena furthi Jäch, 1982^{i c g}
- Hydraena gaditana Lagar and Fresneda, 1990^{i c g}
- Hydraena galatica Janssens, 1970^{i c g}
- Hydraena galea Perkins, 2011^{i c g}
- Hydraena gavarrensis Jäch, Díaz and Martinoy, 2005^{i c g}
- Hydraena geminya Perkins, 1980^{i c g}
- Hydraena genumorpha Perkins, 2014^{i c g}
- Hydraena georgiadesi Orchymont, 1931^{i c g}
- Hydraena geraldneuhauseri Jäch and Díaz, 2006^{i c g}
- Hydraena germaini Orchymont, 1923^{i c g}
- Hydraena glassmani Jäch, 1986^{i c g}
- Hydraena gnatella Orchymont, 1945^{i c g}
- Hydraena gnatelloides Orchymont, 1945^{i c g}
- Hydraena gracilidelphis Trizzino, Valladares, Garrido and Audisio, 2012^{i c g}
- Hydraena gracilis Germar, 1824^{i c g}
- Hydraena graciloides (Jäch, 1988)^{i c g}
- Hydraena grandis Reitter, 1885^{i c g}
- Hydraena graphica Orchymont, 1931^{i c g}
- Hydraena grata Orchymont, 1944^{i c g}
- Hydraena gregalis Orchymont, 1944^{i c g}
- Hydraena gressa Orchymont, 1944^{i c g}
- Hydraena griphus Orchymont, 1944^{i c g}
- Hydraena grouvellei Orchymont, 1923^{i c g}
- Hydraena grueberi Skale and Jäch in Jäch and Skale, 2009^{i c g}
- Hydraena guadelupensis Orchymont, 1923^{i c g}
- Hydraena guangxiensis Jäch and Díaz, 2005^{i c g}
- Hydraena guatemala Perkins, 1980^{i c g}
- Hydraena guentheri Jäch, 1992^{i c g}
- Hydraena guilin Jäch and Díaz, 2005^{i c g}
- Hydraena gynaephila Jäch, 1997^{i c g}
- Hydraena habitiva Perkins, 2014^{i c g}
- Hydraena hainzi Jäch, 1988^{i c g}
- Hydraena haitensis Perkins, 1980^{i c g}
- Hydraena hajeki Skale and Jäch, 2011^{i c g}
- Hydraena hamifera Zwick, 1977^{i c g}
- Hydraena hansreuteri Jäch and Díaz, 2005^{i c g}
- Hydraena hayashii Jäch and Díaz, 2012^{i c g}
- Hydraena helena Orchymont, 1929^{i c g}
- Hydraena hendrichi Jäch, Díaz and Skale, 2013^{i c g}
- Hydraena hernandoi Fresneda and Lagar, 1990^{i c g}
- Hydraena herzogestella Perkins, 2011^{i c g}
- Hydraena heterogyna Bedel, 1898^{i c g}
- Hydraena hiekei Jäch, 1992^{i c g}
- Hydraena hillaryi Skale and Jäch in Jäch and Skale, 2009^{i c g}
- Hydraena hintoni Perkins, 2011^{i c g}
- Hydraena hispanica Ganglbauer, 1901^{i c g}
- Hydraena holdhausi Pretner, 1929^{i c g}
- Hydraena hornabrooki Perkins, 2011^{i c g}
- Hydraena hortensis Jäch and Díaz, 2000^{i c g}
- Hydraena hosiwergi Freitag and Jäch, 2007^{i c g}
- Hydraena hosseinieorum Bilton and Jäch, 1998^{i c g}
- Hydraena huangshanensis Jäch and Díaz, 2005^{i c g}
- Hydraena huitongensis Jäch and Díaz, 2005^{i c g}
- Hydraena humanica Perkins, 2014^{i c g}
- Hydraena hunanensis Pu, 1951^{i c g}
- Hydraena hungarica Rey, 1884^{i c g}
- Hydraena huonica Perkins, 2011^{i c g}
- Hydraena hyalina Perkins, 1980^{i c g}
- Hydraena hynesi Zwick, 1977^{i c g}
- Hydraena hypipamee Perkins, 2007^{i c g}
- Hydraena ibalimi Perkins, 2011^{i c g}
- Hydraena iberica Orchymont, 1936^{i c g}
- Hydraena idema Perkins, 2011^{i c g}
- Hydraena iheya Jäch and Díaz, 1999^{i c g}
- Hydraena ilamensis Skale and Jäch in Jäch and Skale, 2009^{i c g}
- Hydraena ilica Jäch, 1994^{i c g}
- Hydraena imbria Jäch and Díaz, 2001^{i c g}
- Hydraena impala Perkins, 2011^{i c g}
- Hydraena imperatrix Kniz, 1919^{i c g}
- Hydraena impercepta Zwick, 1977^{i c g}
- Hydraena impressicollis Fairmaire, 1898^{i c g}
- Hydraena inancala Perkins, 2007^{i c g}
- Hydraena inapicipalpis Pic, 1918^{i c g}
- Hydraena incisiva Perkins, 2011^{i c g}
- Hydraena incista Perkins, 2011^{i c g}
- Hydraena incurva Orchymont, 1932^{i c g}
- Hydraena indiana Jäch, 1994^{i c g}
- Hydraena indica Orchymont, 1920^{i c g}
- Hydraena infoveola Perkins, 2011^{i c g}
- Hydraena ingens (Perkins, 1980)^{i c g}
- Hydraena inhalista Perkins, 2011^{i c g}
- Hydraena injectiva Perkins, 2014^{i c g}
- Hydraena innuda Perkins, 2007^{i c g}
- Hydraena inopinata Jäch and Díaz, 1998^{i c g}
- Hydraena inplacopaca Perkins, 2011^{i c g}
- Hydraena insandalia Perkins, 2011^{i c g}
- Hydraena insita Orchymont, 1932^{i c g}
- Hydraena insolita Orchymont, 1932^{i c g}
- Hydraena insularis Orchymont, 1945^{i c g}
- Hydraena integra Pretner, 1931^{i c g}
- Hydraena intensa Perkins, 2011^{i c g}
- Hydraena intermedia Rosenhauer, 1847^{i c g}
- Hydraena intraangulata Perkins, 2007^{i c g}
- Hydraena inusta Orchymont, 1932^{i c g}
- Hydraena invicta Perkins, 2007^{i c g}
- Hydraena iriomotensis Jäch and Díaz, 1999^{i c g}
- Hydraena isabelae Castro and Herrera, 2001^{i c g}
- Hydraena isolinae Jäch and Díaz, 1998^{i c g}
- Hydraena ispirensis Kasapoglu, Jäch and Skale, 2010^{i c g}
- Hydraena iterata Orchymont, 1948^{i c g}
- Hydraena jacobsoni Orchymont, 1932^{i c g}
- Hydraena jaechiana (Audisio and De Biase, 1990)^{i c g}
- Hydraena jaegeri Skale and Jäch in Jäch and Skale, 2009^{i c g}
- Hydraena jailensis Breit, 1917^{i c g}
- Hydraena janczyki Jäch, 1992^{i c g}
- Hydraena janeceki Jäch, 1987^{i c g}
- Hydraena janssensi Nilsson, 2001^{i c g}
- Hydraena jengi Jäch and Díaz, 1998^{i c g}
- Hydraena jilanzhui Jäch and Díaz, 2005^{i c g}
- Hydraena jivaro Perkins, 1980^{i c g}
- Hydraena johncoltranei Perkins, 2011^{i c g}
- Hydraena jubilata Perkins, 2011^{i c g}
- Hydraena kadowakii Jäch and Díaz, 2012^{i c g}
- Hydraena kakadu Perkins, 2007^{i c g}
- Hydraena kamitei Jäch and Díaz, 2012^{i c g}
- Hydraena karinkukolae Jäch, 1989^{i c g}
- Hydraena karmai Skale and Jäch in Jäch and Skale, 2009^{i c g}
- Hydraena kasyi Jäch, 1992^{i c g}
- Hydraena kaufmanni Ganglbauer, 1901^{i c g}
- Hydraena kellymilleri Perkins, 2011^{i c g}
- Hydraena khnzoriani Janssens, 1968^{i c g}
- Hydraena kilimandjarensis Régimbart, 1906^{i c g}
- Hydraena kitayamai Jäch and Díaz, 2012^{i c g}
- Hydraena knischi Orchymont, 1928^{i c g}
- Hydraena kocheri Berthélemy, 1992^{i c g}
- Hydraena kodadai Freitag and Jäch, 2007^{i c g}
- Hydraena koje Perkins, 2011^{i c g}
- Hydraena koma Perkins, 2011^{i c g}
- Hydraena krasnodarensis Jäch and Díaz, 2006^{i c g}
- Hydraena kroumiriana Kaddouri, 1992^{i c g}
- Hydraena kucinici Micetic Stankovic and Jäch, 2012^{i c g}
- Hydraena kuehnelti Jäch, 1989^{i c g}
- Hydraena kurdistanica Jäch, 1988^{i c g}
- Hydraena kwangsiensis Pu, 1951^{i c g}
- Hydraena labropaca Perkins, 2011^{i c g}
- Hydraena lagamba Brojer and Jäch, 2011^{i c g}
- Hydraena lapidicola Kiesenwetter, 1849^{i c g}
- Hydraena lapissectilis Jäch, 1992^{i c g}
- Hydraena larissae Jäch and Díaz, 2000^{i c g}
- Hydraena larsoni Perkins, 2007^{i c g}
- Hydraena lascrucensis Brojer and Jäch, 2011^{i c g}
- Hydraena lassulipes Perkins, 2011^{i c g}
- Hydraena latebricola Jäch, 1986^{i c g}
- Hydraena latisoror Perkins, 2007^{i c g}
- Hydraena lazica Janssens, 1963^{i c g}
- Hydraena leechi Perkins, 1980^{i c g}
- Hydraena leei Jäch and Díaz, 1998^{i c g}
- Hydraena legorskyi Jäch and Brojer, 2012^{i c g}
- Hydraena lehmanni Jäch and Díaz, 2005^{i c g}
- Hydraena leonhardi Breit, 1916^{i c g}
- Hydraena leprieuri Sainte-Claire Deville, 1905^{i c g}
- Hydraena levantina Sahlberg, 1908^{i c g}
- Hydraena ligulipes Jäch, 1988^{i c g}
- Hydraena lilianae Perkins, 2011^{i c g}
- Hydraena limbobesa Perkins, 2011^{i c g}
- Hydraena limpidicollis Perkins, 1980^{i c g}
- Hydraena liriope Orchymont, 1943^{i c g}
- Hydraena longicollis Sharp, 1882^{i c g}
- Hydraena loripes Perkins, 2011^{i c g}
- Hydraena lotti Bilton, 2013^{i c g}
- Hydraena lucasi Lagar, 1984^{i c g}
- Hydraena lucernae Zwick, 1977^{i c g}
- Hydraena ludovicae Orchymont, 1931^{i c g}
- Hydraena luminicollis Perkins, 2007^{i c g}
- Hydraena luridipennis MacLeay, 1873^{i c g}
- Hydraena lusitana (Berthélemy in Berthélemy and Whytton Da Terra, 1977)^{i c g}
- Hydraena lycia Jäch, 1988^{i c g}
- Hydraena macedonica Orchymont, 1931^{i c g}
- Hydraena maculicollis Champion, 1920^{i c g}
- Hydraena maculopala Perkins, 2011^{i c g}
- Hydraena madronensis Castor, García and Ferreras, 2000^{i c g}
- Hydraena magna Pu, 1951^{i c g}
- Hydraena magnessa Jäch, 1997^{i c g}
- Hydraena magnetica Zwick, 1977^{i c g}
- Hydraena mahensis Scott, 1913^{i c g}
- Hydraena malagricola Jäch and Díaz, 2012^{i c g}
- Hydraena malickyi Jäch, 1989^{i c g}
- Hydraena malkini Perkins, 1980^{i c g}
- Hydraena manabica Perkins, 2011^{i c g}
- Hydraena manaslu Skale and Jäch in Jäch and Skale, 2009^{i c g}
- Hydraena manfredjaechi Delgado and Soler, 1991^{i c g}
- Hydraena manguao Freitag and Jäch, 2007^{i c g}
- Hydraena manulea Perkins, 2011^{i c g}
- Hydraena manuloides Perkins, 2011^{i c g}
- Hydraena marawaka Perkins, 2011^{i c g}
- Hydraena marcosae Aguilera, Hernando and Ribera, 1997^{i c g}
- Hydraena marginicollis Kiesenwetter, 1849^{i c g}
- Hydraena mariannae Jäch, 1992^{i c g}
- Hydraena marinae Castro, 2003^{i c g}
- Hydraena martensi Skale and Jäch in Jäch and Skale, 2009^{i c g}
- Hydraena martinschoepfi Jäch and Díaz, 2005^{i c g}
- Hydraena masatakai Jäch and Díaz, 2003^{i c g}
- Hydraena maureenae Perkins, 1980^{i c g}
- Hydraena mauriciogarciai Perkins, 2011^{i c g}
- Hydraena mazamitla Perkins, 1980^{i c g}
- Hydraena mecai Millán and Aguilera, 2000^{i c g}
- Hydraena melas Dalla Torre, 1877^{i c g}
- Hydraena mercuriala Perkins, 2011^{i c g}
- Hydraena meschniggi Pretner, 1929^{i c g}
- Hydraena metzeni Perkins, 2007^{i c g}
- Hydraena mexicana Perkins, 1980^{i c g}
- Hydraena mianminica Perkins, 2011^{i c g}
- Hydraena michaelbalkei Jäch, Díaz and Skale, 2013^{i c g}
- Hydraena mignymixys Perkins, 1980^{i c g}
- Hydraena millerorum Perkins, 2007^{i c g}
- Hydraena miniretia Perkins, 2007^{i c g}
- Hydraena mintrita Perkins, 2011^{i c g}
- Hydraena mitchellensis Perkins, 2007^{i c g}
- Hydraena miyatakei Satô, 1959^{i c g}
- Hydraena modili Jäch, 1988^{i c g}
- Hydraena monikae Jäch and Díaz, 2000^{i c g}
- Hydraena monscassius Jäch, 1988^{i c g}
- Hydraena monstruosipes Ferro, 1986^{i c g}
- Hydraena monteithi Perkins, 2007^{i c g}
- Hydraena morio Kiesenwetter, 1849^{i c g}
- Hydraena motzfeldi Skale and Jäch, 2011^{i c g}
- Hydraena mouzaiensis Sainte-Claire Deville, 1909^{i c g}
- Hydraena mpumalanga Perkins, 2014^{i c g}
- Hydraena muelleri Pretner, 1931^{i c g}
- Hydraena muezziginea Jäch, 1988^{i c g}
- Hydraena multiloba Perkins, 2011^{i c g}
- Hydraena multimurata Perkins, 2014^{i c g}
- Hydraena multispina Perkins, 2011^{i c g}
- Hydraena mylasae Jäch, 1992^{i c g}
- Hydraena namibiensis Perkins, 2014^{i c g}
- Hydraena nanocolorata Perkins, 2011^{i c g}
- Hydraena nanopala Perkins, 2011^{i c g}
- Hydraena nanoscintilla Perkins, 2011^{i c g}
- Hydraena natiforma Perkins, 2014^{i c g}
- Hydraena neblina Perkins, 2011^{i c g}
- Hydraena nelsonmandelai Makhan, 2008^{i c g}
- Hydraena neoaccurata Perkins, 2014^{i c g}
- Hydraena nevermanni Perkins, 1980^{i c g}
- Hydraena newtoni Perkins, 1980^{i c g}
- Hydraena nielshaggei Freitag and Jäch, 2007^{i c g}
- Hydraena nigra Hatch, 1965^{i c g}
- Hydraena nigrita Germar, 1824^{i c g}
- Hydraena nike Jäch, 1995^{i c g}
- Hydraena nilguenae (Jäch, 1988)^{i c g}
- Hydraena nitidimenta Perkins, 2011^{i c g}
- Hydraena nivalis Jäch, 1992^{i c g}
- Hydraena nomenipes Perkins, 2014^{i c g}
- Hydraena notsui Satô, 1978^{i c g}
- Hydraena novacula Perkins, 2011^{i c g}
- Hydraena numidica Sainte-Claire Deville, 1905^{i c g}
- Hydraena nurabadensis Skale and Jäch, 2011^{i c g}
- Hydraena nuratauensis Jäch, 1994^{i c g}
- Hydraena oaxaca Perkins, 1980^{i c g}
- Hydraena oblio Perkins, 1980^{i c g}
- Hydraena occidentalis Perkins, 1980^{i c g}
- Hydraena occitana (Audisio and De Biase, 1995)^{i c g}
- Hydraena okapa Perkins, 2011^{i c g}
- Hydraena okinawensis Jäch and Díaz, 1999^{i c g}
- Hydraena olidipastoris Jäch, 1988^{i c g}
- Hydraena ollopa Perkins, 2011^{i c g}
- Hydraena optica Jäch and Díaz, 2012^{i c g}
- Hydraena orchis Jäch and Díaz, 1998^{i c g}
- Hydraena orcula Perkins, 1980^{i c g}
- Hydraena ordishi Delgado and Palma, 1997^{i c g}
- Hydraena orientalis Breit, 1916^{i c g}
- Hydraena ortali Jäch, 1986^{i c g}
- Hydraena orthosia Jäch, Díaz and Dia in Jäch, Dia and Díaz, 2006^{i c g}
- Hydraena otiarca Perkins, 2011^{i c g}
- Hydraena ovata Janssens, 1961^{i c g}
- Hydraena owenobesa Perkins, 2011^{i c g}
- Hydraena oxiana Janssens, 1974^{i c g}
- Hydraena ozarkensis Perkins, 1980^{i c g}
- Hydraena pachyptera Apfelbeck, 1909^{i c g}
- Hydraena pacifica Perkins, 1980^{i c g}
- Hydraena pacificica Perkins, 2011^{i c g}
- Hydraena paeminosa Perkins, 1980^{i c g}
- Hydraena pagaluensis Hernando and Ribera, 2001^{i c g}
- Hydraena paganettii Ganglbauer, 1901^{i c g}
- Hydraena pajarita Brojer and Jäch, 2011^{i c g}
- Hydraena pakistanica Jäch, 1992^{i c g}
- Hydraena pala Perkins, 2011^{i c g}
- Hydraena palamita Perkins, 2011^{i c g}
- Hydraena palawanensis Freitag and Jäch, 2007^{i c g}
- Hydraena pallidula Sainte-Claire Deville, 1909^{i c g}
- Hydraena palustris Erichson, 1837^{i c g}
- Hydraena pamirica Jäch, 1992^{i c g}
- Hydraena pamphylia Jäch and Díaz, 2001^{i c g}
- Hydraena pangaei Jäch, 1992^{i c g}
- Hydraena pantanalensis Perkins, 2011^{i c g}
- Hydraena paraguayensis Janssens, 1972^{i c g}
- Hydraena parciplumea Perkins, 2007^{i c g}
- Hydraena particeps Perkins, 1980^{i c g}
- Hydraena parva Zwick, 1977^{i c g}
- Hydraena parysatis Janssens, 1981^{i c g}
- Hydraena paucistriata Jäch and Díaz, 2000^{i c g}
- Hydraena paulmoritz Jäch, Díaz and Skale, 2013^{i c g}
- Hydraena pavicula Perkins, 1980^{i c g}
- Hydraena paxillipes Perkins, 2011^{i c g}
- Hydraena peckorum Perkins, 2011^{i c g}
- Hydraena pectenata Perkins, 2011^{i c g}
- Hydraena pedroaguilerai Perkins, 2011^{i c g}
- Hydraena pegopyga Perkins, 2011^{i c g}
- Hydraena pelops Jäch, 1995^{i c g}
- Hydraena pennsylvanica Kiesenwetter, 1849^{b}
- Hydraena pensylvanica Kiesenwetter, 1849^{i c g}
- Hydraena penultimata Perkins, 2011^{i c g}
- Hydraena perkinsi Spangler, 1980^{i c g}
- Hydraena perlonga Balfour-Browne, 1950^{i c g}
- Hydraena perpunctata Perkins, 2011^{i c g}
- Hydraena persica Janssens, 1981^{i c g}
- Hydraena pertransversa Perkins, 2011^{i c g}
- Hydraena peru Perkins, 1980^{i c g}
- Hydraena pesici Skale and Jäch, 2011^{i c g}
- Hydraena petila Perkins, 1980^{i c g}
- Hydraena phainops Perkins, 2011^{i c g}
- Hydraena phallerata Orchymont, 1944^{i c g}
- Hydraena phallica Orchymont, 1930^{i c g}
- Hydraena phassilyi Orchymont, 1931^{i c g}
- Hydraena philippi Jäch and Díaz, 2005^{i c g}
- Hydraena philyra Orchymont, 1944^{i c g}
- Hydraena phoenicia Jäch, Díaz and Dia in Jäch, Dia and Díaz, 2006^{i c g}
- Hydraena photogenica Perkins, 2011^{i c g}
- Hydraena pici Sainte-Claire Deville, 1905^{i c g}
- Hydraena picula Perkins, 2011^{i c g}
- Hydraena pilimera Brojer and Jäch, 2011^{i c g}
- Hydraena pilipes Zwick, 1977^{i c g}
- Hydraena pilulambra Perkins, 2011^{i c g}
- Hydraena pindica Janssens, 1965^{i c g}
- Hydraena pisciforma Perkins, 2014^{i c g}
- Hydraena planata Kiesenwetter, 1849^{i c g}
- Hydraena plastica Orchymont, 1943^{i c g}
- Hydraena platycnemis Jäch, 1988^{i c g}
- Hydraena platynaspis Jäch, 1988^{i c g}
- Hydraena platysoma Janssens, 1968^{i c g}
- Hydraena plaumanni Orchymont, 1937^{i c g}
- Hydraena plumipes Rey, 1886^{i c g}
- Hydraena pluralticola Perkins, 2011^{i c g}
- Hydraena plurifurcata Jäch and Díaz, 1998^{i c g}
- Hydraena polita Kiesenwetter, 1849^{i c g}
- Hydraena pontequula Perkins, 1980^{i c g}
- Hydraena pontica Janssens, 1963^{i c g}
- Hydraena porchi Perkins, 2007^{i c g}
- Hydraena porcula Jäch and Díaz, 1998^{i c g}
- Hydraena praetermissa Jäch, 1987^{i c g}
- Hydraena premordica Perkins, 1980^{i c g}
- Hydraena pretneri Chiesa, 1927^{i c g}
- Hydraena prieto Perkins, 1980^{i c g}
- Hydraena princeps Fauvel, 1903^{i c g}
- Hydraena processa Perkins, 2011^{i c g}
- Hydraena producta Mulsant and Rey, 1852^{i c g}
- Hydraena proesei Skale and Jäch, 2011^{i c g}
- Hydraena profunda Perkins, 2014^{i c g}
- Hydraena prokini Jäch and Díaz, 2006^{i c g}
- Hydraena propria Perkins, 2011^{i c g}
- Hydraena prusensis Jäch, 1992^{i c g}
- Hydraena pseudocirrata Skale and Jäch in Jäch and Skale, 2009^{i c g}
- Hydraena pseudopalawanensis Freitag and Jäch, 2007^{i c g}
- Hydraena pseudoriparia Orchymont, 1945^{i c g}
- Hydraena puetzi Jäch, 1994^{i c g}
- Hydraena pugillista Perkins, 2007^{i c g}
- Hydraena pulchella Germar, 1824^{i c g}
- Hydraena pulsatrix Perkins, 1980^{i c g}
- Hydraena punctata LeConte, 1855^{i c g}
- Hydraena puncticollis Sharp, 1882^{i c g}
- Hydraena punctilata Perkins, 2011^{i c g}
- Hydraena putearius Jäch and Díaz, 2000^{i c g}
- Hydraena pygmaea Waterhouse, 1833^{i c g}
- Hydraena quadrata (Janssens, 1980)^{i c g}
- Hydraena quadricollis Wollaston, 1864^{i c g}
- Hydraena quadricurvipes Perkins, 1980^{i c g}
- Hydraena quadriplumipes Perkins, 2011^{i c g}
- Hydraena quechua Perkins, 1980^{i c g}
- Hydraena queenslandica Perkins, 2007^{i c g}
- Hydraena quetiae Castro, 2000^{i c g}
- Hydraena quilisi Lagar, Fresneda and Fernando, 1987^{i c g}
- Hydraena quintana Perkins, 2011^{i c g}
- Hydraena ramuensis Perkins, 2011^{i c g}
- Hydraena ramuquintana Perez, 2011^{i c g}
- Hydraena receptiva Perkins, 2011^{i c g}
- Hydraena reflectiva Perkins, 2014^{i c g}
- Hydraena regimbarti Zaitzev, 1908^{i c g}
- Hydraena remulipes Perkins, 2011^{i c g}
- Hydraena reticulata Zwick, 1977^{i c g}
- Hydraena reticuloides Perkins, 2007^{i c g}
- Hydraena reticulositis Perkins, 2007^{i c g}
- Hydraena revelovela Perkins, 2007^{i c g}
- Hydraena reverberata Perkins, 2011^{i c g}
- Hydraena reyi Kuwert, 1888^{i c g}
- Hydraena rhinoceros (Janssens, 1972)^{i c g}
- Hydraena rhodia Jäch, 1985^{i c g}
- Hydraena riberai Jäch, Aguilera and Hernando, 1998^{i c g}
- Hydraena richardimbi Jäch, 1992^{i c g}
- Hydraena rigua Orchymont, 1931^{i c g}
- Hydraena ripaeaureae (Janssens, 1972)^{i c g}
- Hydraena riparia Kugelann, 1794^{i c g}
- Hydraena rivularis Guillebeau, 1896^{i c g}
- Hydraena robusta Zwick, 1977^{i c g}
- Hydraena rosannae Audisio, Trizzino and De Biase in Audisio, Trizzino, De Biase, Mancini and Antonini, 2009^{i c g}
- Hydraena rudallensis Blackburn, 1896^{i c g}
- Hydraena rufipennis Boscá Berga, 1932^{i c g}
- Hydraena rufipes Curtis, 1830^{i c g}
- Hydraena rugosa Mulsant, 1844^{i c g}
- Hydraena ruinosa Zwick, 1977^{i c g}
- Hydraena rukiyeae Kasapoglu, Jäch and Skale, 2010^{i c g}
- Hydraena sabella Perkins, 1980^{i c g}
- Hydraena saga Orchymont, 1930^{i c g}
- Hydraena sagatai Perkins, 2011^{i c g}
- Hydraena sahlbergi Orchymont, 1923^{i c g}
- Hydraena saluta Perkins, 2011^{i c g}
- Hydraena samia Jäch, 1986^{i c g}
- Hydraena samnitica Knisch, 1924^{i c g}
- Hydraena sanagergelyae Brojer and Jäch, 2011^{i c g}
- Hydraena sanfilippoi (Audisio and De Biase, 1995)^{i c g}
- Hydraena sappho Janssens, 1965^{i c g}
- Hydraena sardoa Binaghi, 1961^{i c g}
- Hydraena satoi Jäch and Díaz, 1999^{i c g}
- Hydraena sautakei Jäch and Díaz, 1999^{i c g}
- Hydraena sauteri Orchymont, 1913^{i c g}
- Hydraena scabra Orchymont, 1925^{i c g}
- Hydraena scabrosa Orchymont, 1931^{i c g}
- Hydraena schawalleri Skale and Jäch in Jäch and Skale, 2009^{i c g}
- Hydraena schilfii Jäch, 1988^{i c g}
- Hydraena schillhammeri Jäch, 1988^{i c g}
- Hydraena schmidi Jäch and Díaz, 2001^{i c g}
- Hydraena schoedli Jäch, 1992^{i c g}
- Hydraena schoenmanni Jäch, 1988^{i c g}
- Hydraena schubertorum Jäch and Díaz, 2001^{i c g}
- Hydraena schuelkei Jäch, 1992^{i c g}
- Hydraena schuleri Ganglbauer, 1901^{i c g}
- Hydraena scintilla Perkins, 1980^{i c g}
- Hydraena scintillabella Perkins, 1980^{i c g}
- Hydraena scintillamima Perkins, 2011^{i c g}
- Hydraena scintillapicta Perkins, 2011^{i c g}
- Hydraena scintillarca Perkins, 2011^{i c g}
- Hydraena scintillutea Perkins, 1980^{i c g}
- Hydraena scitula Orchymont, 1943^{i c g}
- Hydraena scolops Perkins, 1980^{i c g}
- Hydraena scopula Perkins, 1980^{i c g}
- Hydraena scythica Janssens, 1974^{i c g}
- Hydraena sebastiani Perkins, 2014^{i c g}
- Hydraena sepikramuensis Perkins, 2011^{i c g}
- Hydraena septemlacuum Jäch, 1992^{i c g}
- Hydraena serpentina Jäch, 1988^{i c g}
- Hydraena serricollis Wollaston, 1864^{i c g}
- Hydraena servilia Orchymont, 1936^{i c g}
- Hydraena sexarcuata Perkins, 2011^{i c g}
- Hydraena sexsuprema Perkins, 2011^{i c g}
- Hydraena sharmai Skale and Jäch in Jäch and Skale, 2009^{i c g}
- Hydraena sharpi Rey, 1886^{i c g}
- Hydraena shorti Perkins, 2011^{i c g}
- Hydraena sicula Kiesenwetter, 1849^{i c g}
- Hydraena sidon Jäch, Díaz and Dia in Jäch, Dia and Díaz, 2006^{i c g}
- Hydraena sierra Perkins, 1980^{i c g}
- Hydraena similis Orchymont, 1930^{i c g}
- Hydraena simonidea Orchymont, 1931^{i c g}
- Hydraena simplicicollis Blackburn, 1896^{i c g}
- Hydraena simplipes Zwick, 1977^{i c g}
- Hydraena singaporensis Jäch, Díaz and Skale, 2013^{i c g}
- Hydraena sinope Jäch, 1992^{i c g}
- Hydraena smyrnensis Sahlberg, 1908^{i c g}
- Hydraena socius Jäch and Díaz, 1999^{i c g}
- Hydraena solarii Pretner, 1930^{i c g}
- Hydraena solodovnikovi Jäch and Díaz, 2006^{i c g}
- Hydraena sordida Sharp, 1882^{i c g}
- Hydraena spangleri Perkins, 1980^{i c g}
- Hydraena spatula Perkins, 2011^{i c g}
- Hydraena speciosa Orchymont, 1944^{i c g}
- Hydraena spinipes Baudi, 1882^{i c g}
- Hydraena spinissima Perkins, 2007^{i c g}
- Hydraena spinobesa Perkins, 2011^{i c g}
- Hydraena splecoma Perkins, 1980^{i c g}
- Hydraena squalida Orchymont, 1932^{i c g}
- Hydraena stefani Jäch and Díaz, 2005^{i c g}
- Hydraena steineri Perkins, 2011^{i c g}
- Hydraena stellula Perkins, 2011^{i c g}
- Hydraena storeyi Perkins, 2007^{i c g}
- Hydraena striolata Perkins, 2011^{i c g}
- Hydraena stussineri Kuwert, 1888^{i c g}
- Hydraena subacuminata Rey, 1884^{i c g}
- Hydraena subgrandis Jäch, 1988^{i c g}
- Hydraena subimpressa Rey, 1885^{i c g}
- Hydraena subina Orchymont, 1944^{i c g}
- Hydraena subinflata Orchymont, 1944^{i c g}
- Hydraena subinoides Orchymont, 1944^{i c g}
- Hydraena subintegra Ganglbauer, 1901^{i c g}
- Hydraena subinura Orchymont, 1944^{i c g}
- Hydraena subirregularis Pic, 1918^{i c g}
- Hydraena subjuncta Orchymont, 1930^{i c g}
- Hydraena sublamina Orchymont, 1945^{i c g}
- Hydraena sublapsa Orchymont, 1945^{i c g}
- Hydraena subsequens Rey, 1886^{i c g}
- Hydraena supersexa Perkins, 2011^{i c g}
- Hydraena supina Perkins, 2011^{i c g}
- Hydraena szechuanensis Pu, 1951^{i c g}
- Hydraena takin Skale and Jäch in Jäch and Skale, 2009^{i c g}
- Hydraena takutu Perkins, 2011^{i c g}
- Hydraena tarsotricha Perkins, 2011^{i c g}
- Hydraena tarvisina (Ferro, 1992)^{i c g}
- Hydraena tatii Sáinz-Cantero and Alba-Tercedor, 1989^{i c g}
- Hydraena tauricola Jäch, 1988^{i c g}
- Hydraena taxila Janssens, 1962^{i c g}
- Hydraena tekmanensis Jäch, Skale and Kasapoglu, 2011^{i c g}
- Hydraena tenjikuana Satô, 1979^{i c g}
- Hydraena tenuis (Janssens, 1980)^{i c g}
- Hydraena tenuisella Perkins, 2007^{i c g}
- Hydraena tenuisoror Perkins, 2007^{i c g}
- Hydraena terebrans Jäch, 1992^{i c g}
- Hydraena terralta Perkins, 1980^{i c g}
- Hydraena testacea Curtis, 1830^{i c g}
- Hydraena tetana Perkins, 2011^{i c g}
- Hydraena textila Perkins, 2007^{i c g}
- Hydraena thienemanni Orchymont, 1932^{i c g}
- Hydraena thola Perkins, 2011^{i c g}
- Hydraena tholasoris Perkins, 2011^{i c g}
- Hydraena thumbelina Perkins, 2011^{i c g}
- Hydraena thumbelipes Perkins, 2011^{i c g}
- Hydraena thyene Balfour-Browne, 1958^{i c g}
- Hydraena tiara Perkins, 2014^{i c g}
- Hydraena tibiopaca Perkins, 2011^{i c g}
- Hydraena tobogan Perkins, 2011^{i c g}
- Hydraena torosopala Perkins, 2011^{i c g}
- Hydraena torricellica Perkins, 2011^{i c g}
- Hydraena transvallis Perkins, 2011^{i c g}
- Hydraena trapezoidalis Zwick, 1977^{i c g}
- Hydraena tricantha Zwick, 1977^{i c g}
- Hydraena trichotarsa Perkins, 2011^{i c g}
- Hydraena tricosipes Perkins, 2011^{i c g}
- Hydraena tridigita Perkins, 2011^{i c g}
- Hydraena tridisca Perkins, 2007^{i c g}
- Hydraena triloba Perkins, 2007^{i c g}
- Hydraena trinidensis Perkins, 1980^{i c g}
- Hydraena triparamera Jäch, 1982^{i c g}
- Hydraena tritropis Perkins, 2011^{i c g}
- Hydraena tritutela Perkins, 2011^{i c g}
- Hydraena truncata Rey, 1885^{i c g}
- Hydraena tsushimaensis Jäch and Díaz, 2012^{i c g}
- Hydraena tubuliphallis Jäch, 1982^{i c g}
- Hydraena tucumanica Perkins, 1980^{i c g}
- Hydraena tuolumne Perkins, 1980^{i c g}
- Hydraena turcica Janssens, 1965^{i c g}
- Hydraena turrialba Perkins, 1980^{i c g}
- Hydraena tyrrhena Binaghi, 1961^{i c g}
- Hydraena ulna Perkins, 2011^{i c g}
- Hydraena umbolenta Perkins, 2011^{i c g}
- Hydraena unca Valladares, 1989^{i c g}
- Hydraena undevigintioctogintasisyphos Jäch and Díaz, 2005^{i c g}
- Hydraena undulata Jäch and Díaz, 1998^{i c g}
- Hydraena uniforma Perkins, 2014^{i c g}
- Hydraena unita Perkins, 2011^{i c g}
- Hydraena uzbekistanica Jäch, 1994^{i c g}
- Hydraena vadosa Perkins, 2014^{i c g}
- Hydraena valentini Jäch and Díaz, 2012^{i c g}
- Hydraena vandykei Orchymont, 1923^{i c g}
- Hydraena variopaca Perkins, 2011^{i c g}
- Hydraena vedrasi Orchymont, 1931^{i c g}
- Hydraena vela Perkins, 1980^{i c g}
- Hydraena velvetina Perkins, 2011^{i c g}
- Hydraena venezuela Perkins, 2011^{i c g}
- Hydraena verberans Jäch and Díaz, 2006^{i c g}
- Hydraena verstraeteni Ferro, 1984^{i c g}
- Hydraena victoriae Jäch and Díaz, 1999^{i c g}
- Hydraena vietnamensis (Janssens, 1972)^{i c g}
- Hydraena virginalis Janssens, 1963^{i c g}
- Hydraena vodozi Sainte-Claire Deville, 1908^{i c g}
- Hydraena vulgaris Jäch and Díaz, 2000^{i c g}
- Hydraena waldheimi Jäch, 1987^{i c g}
- Hydraena wangi Jäch and Díaz, 1998^{i c g}
- Hydraena wangmiaoi Jäch and Díaz, 2005^{i c g}
- Hydraena watanabei Jäch and Satô, 1988^{i c g}
- Hydraena wattsi Perkins, 2007^{i c g}
- Hydraena weigeli Skale and Jäch in Jäch and Skale, 2009^{i c g}
- Hydraena weiri Perkins, 2007^{i c g}
- Hydraena wencke Skale and Jäch in Jäch and Skale, 2009^{i c g}
- Hydraena wewalkai Jäch, 1988^{i c g}
- Hydraena williamsensis Deane, 1931^{i c g}
- Hydraena wittmeri Satô, 1979^{i c g}
- Hydraena wolfi Skale and Jäch in Jäch and Skale, 2009^{i c g}
- Hydraena wrasei Jäch, 1992^{i c g}
- Hydraena xingu Perkins, 2011^{i c g}
- Hydraena yangae Jäch, Díaz and Skale, 2013^{i c g}
- Hydraena yonaguniensis Jäch and Díaz, 2003^{i c g}
- Hydraena yosemitensis Perkins, 1980^{i c g}
- Hydraena yoshitomii Jäch and Díaz, 1999^{i c g}
- Hydraena youngi Perkins, 1980^{i c g}
- Hydraena ypsilon Zwick, 1977^{i c g}
- Hydraena yunnanensis Pu, 1942^{i c g}
- Hydraena zapatina Perkins, 1980^{i c g}
- Hydraena zelandica Ordish, 1984^{i c g}
- Hydraena zetteli Freitag and Jäch, 2007^{i c g}
- Hydraena zezerensis Díaz Pazos and Bilton, 1995^{i c g}
- Hydraena zimbabwensis Perkins, 2014^{i c g}
- Hydraena zwicki Perkins, 2007^{i c g}

Data sources: i = ITIS, c = Catalogue of Life, g = GBIF, b = Bugguide.net
