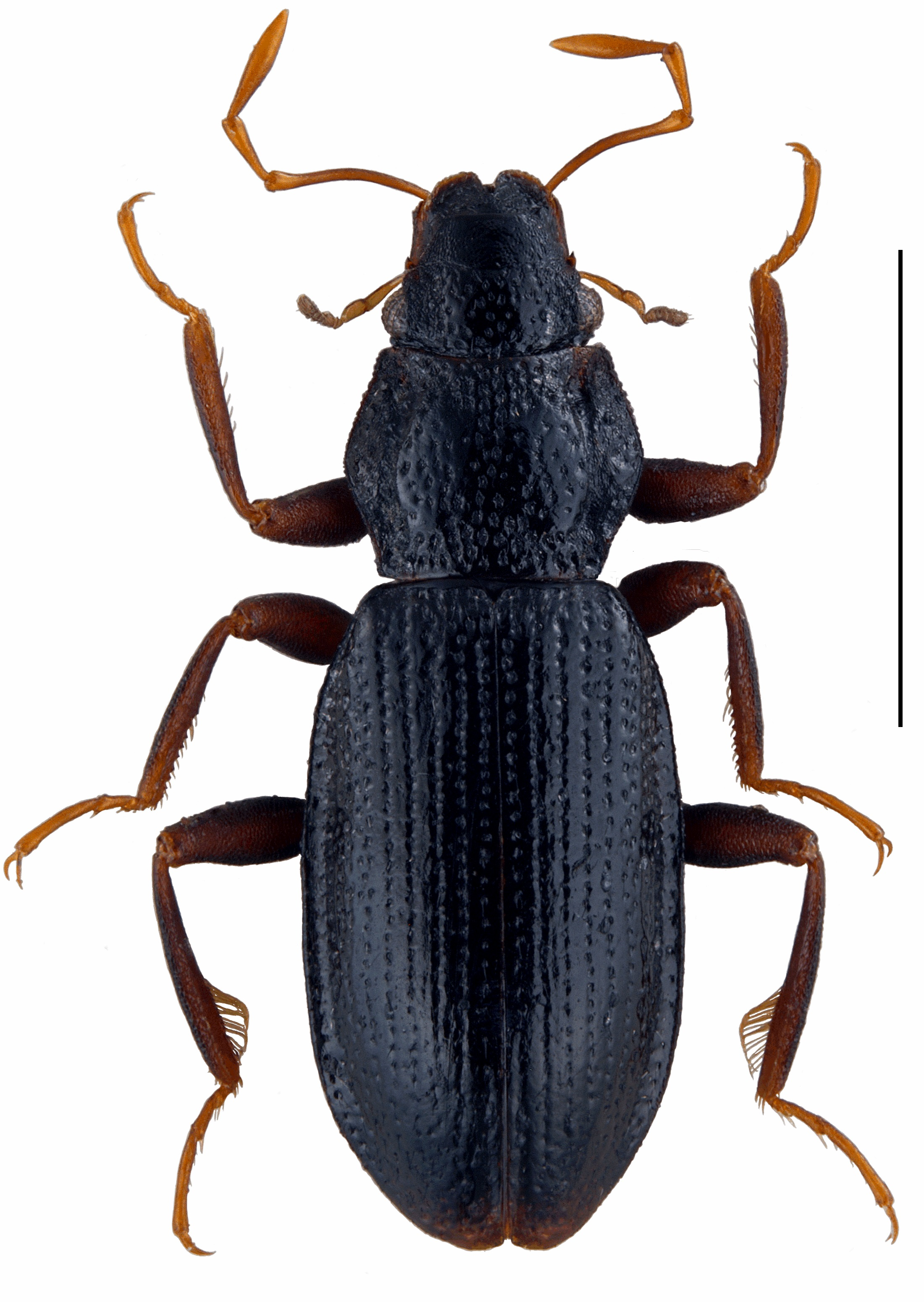

Scientific classification
- Kingdom: Animalia
- Phylum: Arthropoda
- Class: Insecta
- Order: Coleoptera
- Suborder: Polyphaga
- Infraorder: Staphyliniformia
- Family: Hydraenidae
- Genus: Hydraena
- Species: H. dinarica

Binomial name
- Hydraena dinarica Freitag & de Vries, 2021
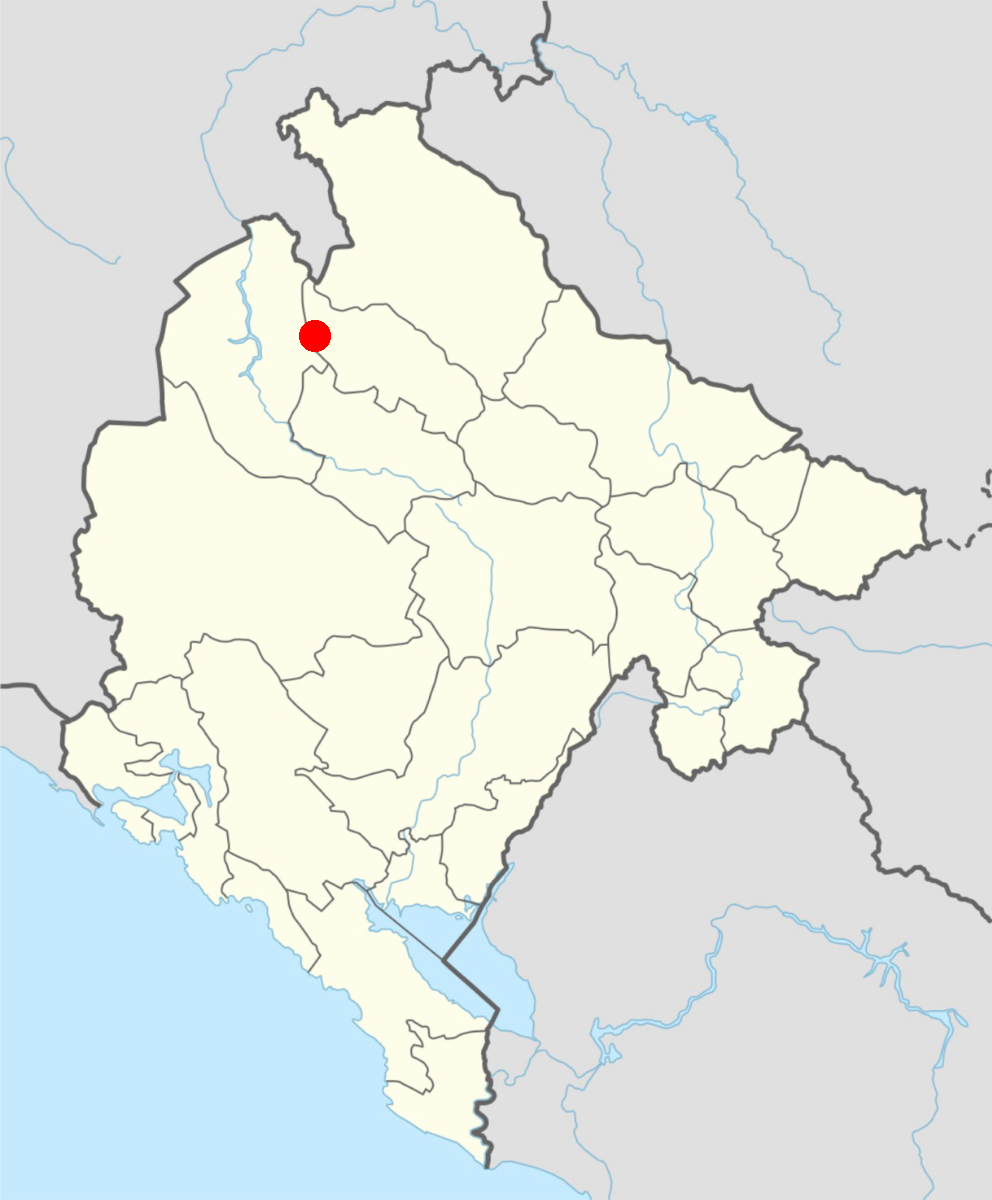

= Hydraena dinarica =

Species of beetle

Hydraena dinarica is a species of minute moss beetle in the family Hydraenidae. It is found in Montenegro.

== Distribution ==
This species is endemic to Montenegro and is known only from its type locality on the northern slopes of Mount Durmitor. It inhabits cold water karst creeks, such as the Skakala stream, where water flow is predominantly subsurface.
