= Hydraena angulicollis =

Scientific classification
- Domain: Eukaryota
- Kingdom: Animalia
- Phylum: Arthropoda
- Class: Insecta
- Order: Coleoptera
- Suborder: Polyphaga
- Infraorder: Staphyliniformia
- Family: Hydraenidae
- Genus: Hydraena
- Species: H. angulicollis

Binomial name
- Hydraena angulicollis Notman, 1921

Species of beetle

Hydraena angulicollis is a species of minute moss beetle in the family Hydraenidae. It is found in North America.
