= Hydraena biltoni =

Scientific classification
- Kingdom: Animalia
- Phylum: Arthropoda
- Class: Insecta
- Order: Coleoptera
- Suborder: Polyphaga
- Infraorder: Staphyliniformia
- Family: Hydraenidae
- Genus: Hydraena
- Species: H. biltoni

Binomial name
- Hydraena biltoni Jäch and Díaz, 2012
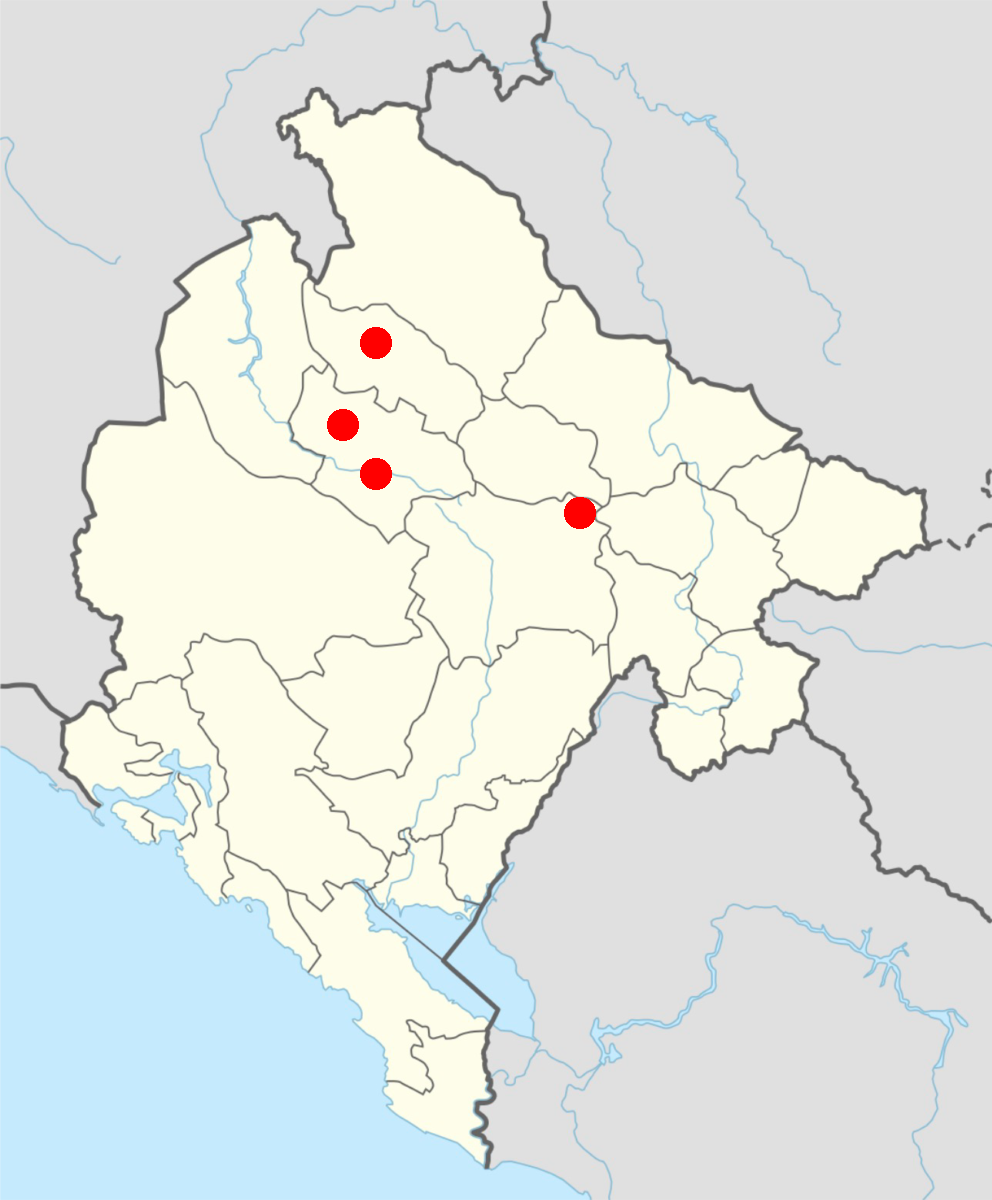

Species of beetle

Hydraena biltoni is a species of minute moss beetle found in Montenegro.

== Distribution ==
This species is endemic to northern and north-central Montenegro. It has been recorded from localities near Durmitor National Park and Biogradska Gora National Park, inhabiting hygropetric rock faces and small streams at elevations ranging from approximately 900 to 1,435 meters.
