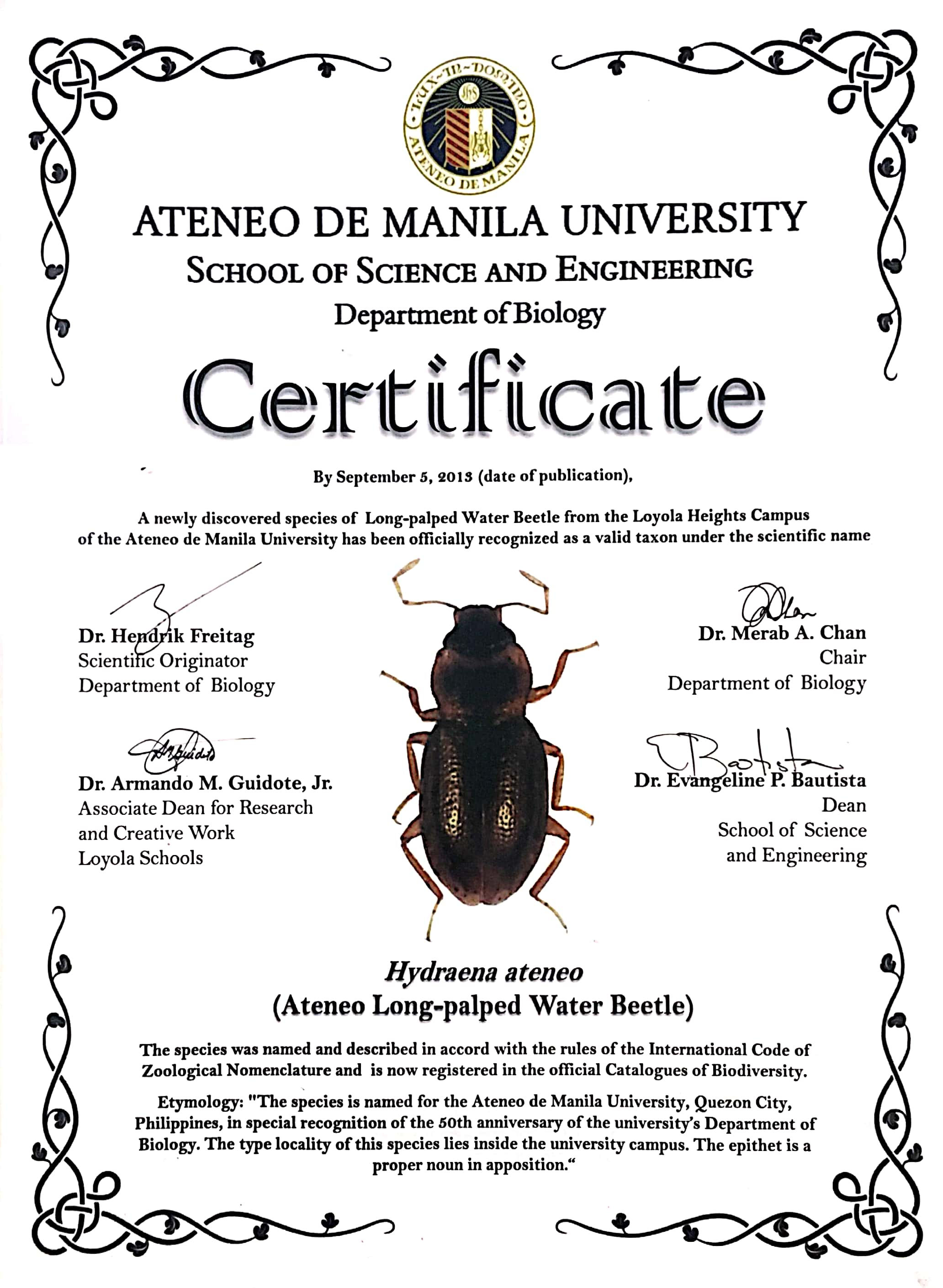
- Certificate depicting the etymology of the H. ateneo

Scientific classification
- Kingdom: Animalia
- Phylum: Arthropoda
- Clade: Pancrustacea
- Class: Insecta
- Order: Coleoptera
- Suborder: Polyphaga
- Infraorder: Staphyliniformia
- Family: Hydraenidae
- Genus: Hydraena
- Species: H. ateneo

Binomial name
- Hydraena ateneo Freitag, 2013

= Hydraena ateneo =

Species of beetle

Hydraena ateneo is a small aquatic beetle recently discovered in Metro Manila, the Philippines. It is predominantly brown, with yellow-brown antennae. Unlike other beetles in the genus Hydraena, Hydraena ateneo can be distinguished by its small size and distinct aedeagus. The species is named after the Ateneo de Manila University, Quezon City, where the species was discovered. The species can be found in freshwater areas around Manila.

== Etymology ==
Hydraena ateneo is a species found in and named after the Ateneo De Manila University, Quezon City, Philippines, that was recognized under the fiftieth anniversary of the university's Department of Biology. The species was also given a common name of the Ateneo Long-palped Water Beetle.

== Description ==
The specimen is seen to be approximately 1.25 to 1.33 mm in length and 0.58 to 0.62 mm in width. Its body is predominantly brown, with gold-brown hues on its pronotum, dark brown frons, and yellow brown maxillary palpi, legs, and antennae.

The species has found to have aedeagus, the male reproductive system, and distinctive legs.

== Distribution ==
Although the species was initially discovered inside the Ateneo de Manila University campus, it is likely to occur in freshwater bodies in Manila and Luzon. Some known places it has been found are in Quezon City, Cavite, and Laguna, Philippines. The existence of the new species inside the Ateneo campus is notable as the campus is a highly urbanized, deforested area.

== Diet ==
Water beetles are generally herbivores, predators, or scavengers. H. ateneo likely consumes moss, based on other species of genus Hydraena known to consume moss, the presence of moss in the pond that the species was discovered in, and as a member of the family Hydraenidae (which are usually phytophagous).

== Species ==
Hydraena ateneo take its name from its genus, Hydraena, which is a type of moss beetle within the family Hydraenidae. This family is known for aquatic beetles being 1–3 mm long, usually found crawling in vegetation near bodies of water despite not having the capability to swim so well. Their usual diet include algae, bacteria, protozoans and detritus found on stones and plants.
