= List of Limnebius species =

This is a list of 155 species in Limnebius, a genus of minute moss beetles in the family Hydraenidae.

== Limnebius species ==
- Limnebius acupunctus Perkins, 2004^{i c g}
- Limnebius aguilerai Ribera and Millán, 1998^{i c g}
- Limnebius alibeii Hernando, Aguilera and Ribera, 1999^{i c g}
- Limnebius alluaudi Orchymont, 1948^{i c g}
- Limnebius almoranus Knisch, 1924^{i c g}
- Limnebius aluta Bedel, 1881^{i c g}
- Limnebius alutaceus (Casey, 1886)^{i c g b}
- Limnebius angulatus Perkins, 2017^{g}
- Limnebius angustipennis Orchymont, 1932^{i c g}
- Limnebius angustulus (Casey, 1886)^{i c g}
- Limnebius apolloniae Jäch and Delgado, 2013^{i c g}
- Limnebius arabicus Balfour-Browne, 1951^{i c g}
- Limnebius arenicolus Perkins, 1980^{i c g}
- Limnebius aridus Perkins, 1980^{i c g}
- Limnebius asperatus Knisch, 1922^{i c g}
- Limnebius atomus (Duftschmid, 1805)^{i c g}
- Limnebius attalensis Jäch, 1993^{i c g}
- Limnebius bacchus Balfour-Browne, 1978^{i c g}
- Limnebius balkei Perkins, 2017^{g}
- Limnebius bergsteni Perkins, 2017^{g}
- Limnebius borealis Perkins, 1980^{i c g}
- Limnebius boukali Jäch, 1993^{i c g}
- Limnebius calabricus Jäch, 1993^{i c g}
- Limnebius canariensis Orchymont, 1938^{i c g}
- Limnebius capensis Perkins, 2015^{i c g}
- Limnebius championi Balfour-Browne, 1956^{i c g}
- Limnebius clandestinus Perkins, 2017^{g}
- Limnebius clavatus Pu, 1951^{i c g}
- Limnebius claviger Jäch, 1993^{i c g}
- Limnebius clayae Balfour-Browne, 1956^{i c g}
- Limnebius conoideus Régimbart, 1905^{i c g}
- Limnebius convexus Perkins, 2015^{i c g}
- Limnebius cordobanus Orchymont, 1938^{i c g}
- Limnebius corfidius Orchymont, 1945^{i c g}
- Limnebius corybus Orchymont, 1945^{i c g}
- Limnebius crassipes Kuwert, 1890^{i c g}
- Limnebius crinifer Rey, 1885^{i c g}
- Limnebius cruzei Jäch, 1982^{i c g}
- Limnebius cupulifer Orchymont, 1941^{i c g}
- Limnebius curidius Orchymont, 1941^{i c g}
- Limnebius damasi Balfour-Browne, 1950^{i c g}
- Limnebius dioscoridus Jäch and Delgado, 2012^{i c g}
- Limnebius discolor Casey, 1900^{i c g}
- Limnebius distinctus Knisch, 1924^{i c g}
- Limnebius distinguendus Ferro, 1989^{i c g}
- Limnebius doderoi Gridelli, 1926^{i c g}
- Limnebius endroedyi Perkins, 2015^{i c g}
- Limnebius evanescens Kiesenwetter, 1866^{i c g}
- Limnebius extraneus Orchymont, 1938^{i c g}
- Limnebius fallaciosus Ganglbauer, 1904^{i c g}
- Limnebius ferroi Jäch, 1993^{i c g}
- Limnebius feuerborni Orchymont, 1932^{i c g}
- Limnebius fontinalis Balfour-Browne, 1951^{i c g}
- Limnebius fretalis Peyerimhoff, 1913^{i c g}
- Limnebius furcatus Baudi, 1872^{i c g}
- Limnebius gerhardti Heyden, 1870^{i c g}
- Limnebius glabriventris Shatrovskiy, 1989^{i c g}
- Limnebius gracilipes Wollaston, 1864^{i c g}
- Limnebius graecus Jäch, 1993^{i c g}
- Limnebius grandicollis Wollaston, 1854^{i c g}
- Limnebius gridellii Pretner, 1929^{i c g}
- Limnebius hieronymi Vorst, 2006^{i c g}
- Limnebius hilaris Balfour-Browne, 1978^{i c g}
- Limnebius hispanicus Orchymont, 1941^{i c g}
- Limnebius ibericus Balfour-Browne, 1978^{i c g}
- Limnebius ignarus Balfour-Browne, 1978^{i c g}
- Limnebius immersus Knisch, 1926^{i c g}
- Limnebius irmelae Jäch, 1993^{i c g}
- Limnebius javanus Orchymont, 1932^{i c g}
- Limnebius jeanneli Orchymont, 1948^{i c g}
- Limnebius kamali Sáinz-Cantero and Bennas, 2006^{i c g}
- Limnebius kaszabi Chiesa, 1967^{i c g}
- Limnebius kavango Perkins, 2015^{i c g}
- Limnebius kelaniyae Jäch, 1982^{i c g}
- Limnebius kocheri Balfour-Browne, 1978^{i c g}
- Limnebius kwangdongensis Pu, 1937^{g}
- Limnebius kwangtungensis Pu, 1936^{i c g}
- Limnebius kweichowensis Pu, 1951^{i c g}
- Limnebius labratus Perkins, 2017^{g}
- Limnebius lacrimosus Perkins, 2017^{g}
- Limnebius leachi Orchymont, 1932^{i c g}
- Limnebius leechi Perkins, 1980^{i c g}
- Limnebius levantinus Jäch, 1993^{i c g}
- Limnebius lobatus Perkins, 2017^{g}
- Limnebius loeblorum Jäch, 1993^{i c g}
- Limnebius lusitanus Balfour-Browne, 1978^{i c g}
- Limnebius masculinus Perkins, 2015^{i c g}
- Limnebius maurus Balfour-Browne, 1978^{i c g}
- Limnebius maximadus Perkins, 2017^{g}
- Limnebius mesatlanticus Théry, 1933^{i c g}
- Limnebius mexicanus Perkins, 1980^{i c g}
- Limnebius millani Ribera and Hernando, 1998^{i c g}
- Limnebius minoricensis Jäch, Valladares and García-Avilés, 1996^{i c g}
- Limnebius mitus Perkins, 1980^{i c g}
- Limnebius monfortei Fresneda & Ribera, 1998^{g}
- Limnebius montanus Balfour-Browne, 1978^{i c g}
- Limnebius mucronatus Baudi, 1872^{i c g}
- Limnebius mundus Baudi, 1864^{i c g}
- Limnebius murcus Orchymont, 1945^{i c g}
- Limnebius murentius Orchymont, 1945^{i c g}
- Limnebius mutatus Orchymont, 1945^{i c g}
- Limnebius myrmidon Rey, 1883^{i c g}
- Limnebius nakanei Jäch and Matsui, 1994^{i c g}
- Limnebius nanostillus Perkins, 2017^{g}
- Limnebius nanus Jäch, 1993^{i c g}
- Limnebius nigritus Balfour-Browne, 1956^{i c g}
- Limnebius nitiduloides Baudi, 1872^{i c g}
- Limnebius nitidus (Marsham, 1802)^{i c g}
- Limnebius nitifarus Orchymont, 1938^{i c g}
- Limnebius nitigeus Orchymont, 1945^{i c g}
- Limnebius oblongus Rey, 1883^{i c g}
- Limnebius octolaevis Perkins, 1980^{i c g}
- Limnebius ordunyai Fresneda & Ribera, 1998^{g}
- Limnebius oweni Jäch and Delgado, 2013^{i c g}
- Limnebius ozapalachicus Perkins, 1980^{i c g}
- Limnebius paganettii Ganglbauer, 1904^{i c g}
- Limnebius papposus Mulsant, 1844^{i c g}
- Limnebius paranuristanus Ferro, 1989^{i c g}
- Limnebius parvulus (Herbst, 1797)^{i c g}
- Limnebius perparvulus Rey, 1884^{i c g}
- Limnebius piceus (Horn, 1872)^{i c g}
- Limnebius pilicauda Guillebeau, 1896^{i c g}
- Limnebius pollex Jäch and Delgado, 2013^{i c g}
- Limnebius probus Perkins, 2015^{i c g}
- Limnebius punctatus Wollaston, 1864^{i c g}
- Limnebius quantillus Perkins, 2015^{i c g}
- Limnebius retiolus Perkins, 2015^{i c g}
- Limnebius reuvenortali Jäch, 1993^{i c g}
- Limnebius richmondi Perkins, 1980^{i c g}
- Limnebius rubropiceus Kuwert, 1890^{i c g}
- Limnebius rufipennis Régimbart, 1903^{i c g}
- Limnebius sanctimontis Jäch, 1993^{i c g}
- Limnebius schoenmanni Jäch, 1993^{i c g}
- Limnebius setifer Khnzorian, 1962^{i c g}
- Limnebius shatrovskiyi Jäch, 1993^{i c g}
- Limnebius similis Wollaston, 1865^{i c g}
- Limnebius simplex Baudi, 1882^{i c g}
- Limnebius simulans Orchymont, 1940^{i c g}
- Limnebius sinuatus (Sharp, 1882)^{i c g}
- Limnebius speculus Perkins, 2015^{i c g}
- Limnebius spinosus Jäch, 1993^{i c g}
- Limnebius stagnalis Guillebeau, 1890^{i c g}
- Limnebius steineri Perkins, 2017^{g}
- Limnebius suaviculus Perkins, 2015^{i c g}
- Limnebius taiwanensis Jäch, 1993^{i c g}
- Limnebius texanus Perkins, 1980^{i c g}
- Limnebius theryi Guillebeau, 1891^{i c g}
- Limnebius thienemanni Orchymont, 1932^{i c g}
- Limnebius transversus Perkins, 2015^{i c g}
- Limnebius truncatellus (Thunberg, 1794)^{i c g}
- Limnebius utahensis Perkins, 1980^{i c g}
- Limnebius vinsoni Orchymont, 1941^{i c g}
- Limnebius wittei Balfour-Browne, 1950^{i c g}
- Limnebius wui Pu, 1942^{i c g}
- Limnebius zaerensis Hernando, Aguilera and Ribera, 2008^{i c g}

Data sources: i = ITIS, c = Catalogue of Life, g = GBIF, b = Bugguide.net
