= List of Ochthebius species =

This is a list of 452 species in Ochthebius, a genus of minute moss beetles in the family Hydraenidae.

== Ochthebius species ==
- Ochthebius abeillei Guillebeau, 1896^{i c g}
- Ochthebius adriaticus Reitter, 1886^{i c g}
- Ochthebius adventicius Jäch, 1990^{i c g}
- Ochthebius aeneus Stephens, 1835^{i c g}
- Ochthebius afghanicus Jäch, 1991^{i c g}
- Ochthebius aguilerai Ribera, Castro and Hernando, 2010^{i c g}
- Ochthebius ahni Jäch and Delgado, 2014^{i c g}
- Ochthebius akbuluti Jäch, Kasapoglu and Erman, 2003^{i c g}
- Ochthebius albacetinus Ferro, 1984^{i c g}
- Ochthebius albanicus (Orchymont, 1941)^{i c g}
- Ochthebius algicola Wollaston, 1871^{i c g}
- Ochthebius alluaudi Régimbart, 1903^{i c g}
- Ochthebius almorenis Jäch, 1989^{i c g}
- Ochthebius alpheius Janssens, 1959^{i c g}
- Ochthebius alpinopetrus Perkins, 1980^{i c g}
- Ochthebius alpinus (Ienistea, 1979)^{i c g}
- Ochthebius amami Yoshitomi and Satô, 2001^{i c g}
- Ochthebius amplicollis Champion, 1925^{i c g}
- Ochthebius amrishi Makhan, 2004^{i c g}
- Ochthebius anatolicus (Janssens, 1963)^{i c g}
- Ochthebius anaxagoras Jäch, 1999^{i c g}
- Ochthebius anchorus Perkins, 2011^{i c g}
- Ochthebius andalusicus Jäch and Castro, 1999^{i c g}
- Ochthebius andraei Breit, 1920^{i c g}
- Ochthebius andreasi Jäch, 2003^{i c g}
- Ochthebius andreasoides Jäch, 2003^{i c g}
- Ochthebius andreinii Régimbart, 1905^{i c g}
- Ochthebius andronicus Orchymont, 1948^{g}
- Ochthebius andronius Orchymont, 1948^{i c g}
- Ochthebius angelinii Ferro, 2008^{i c g}
- Ochthebius angularidus Perkins, 1980^{i c g}
- Ochthebius angusi Jäch, 1994^{i c g}
- Ochthebius annae Ferro, 1979^{i c g}
- Ochthebius anxifer Balfour-Browne, 1978^{i c g}
- Ochthebius apache Perkins, 1980^{i c g}
- Ochthebius apicalis Sharp, 1882^{i c g}
- Ochthebius arabicus Jäch, 1992^{i c g}
- Ochthebius arator Ertorun and Jäch, 2014^{i c g}
- Ochthebius arefniae Jäch and Delgado, 2008^{i c g}
- Ochthebius arenicolus Perkins, 1980^{i c g}
- Ochthebius argentatus Jäch, 2003^{i c g}
- Ochthebius aristoteles Jäch, 1999^{i c g}
- Ochthebius arizonicus Perkins, 1980^{i c g}
- Ochthebius asanoae Jäch and Delgado, 2014^{i c g}
- Ochthebius asiobatoides Jäch, 2003^{i c g}
- Ochthebius asperatus Jäch, 2003^{i c g}
- Ochthebius atratulus Régimbart, 1905^{i c g}
- Ochthebius atricapillus Reitter, 1901^{i c g}
- Ochthebius atriceps Fairmaire, 1879^{i c g}
- Ochthebius attritus LeConte, 1878^{i c g}
- Ochthebius auriculatus Rey, 1886^{i c g}
- Ochthebius auropallens Fairmaire, 1879^{i c g}
- Ochthebius avdati Delgado and Jäch, 2007^{i c g}
- Ochthebius aztecus Sharp, 1887^{i c g}
- Ochthebius bactrianus Janssens, 1962^{i c g}
- Ochthebius balcanicus (Ienistea, 1988)^{i c g}
- Ochthebius balfourbrownei Jäch, 1989^{i c g}
- Ochthebius basilicatus Fiori, 1915^{i c g}
- Ochthebius batesoni Blair, 1933^{i c g}
- Ochthebius bellieri Kuwert, 1887^{i c g}
- Ochthebius bellstedti Jäch, 1992^{i c g}
- Ochthebius belucistanicus Ferro, 1984^{i c g}
- Ochthebius benefossus LeConte, 1878^{i c g}
- Ochthebius bernhardi Jäch and Delgado, 2008^{i c g}
- Ochthebius bicolon Germar, 1824^{i c g}
- Ochthebius bicomicus Perkins, 2011^{i c g}
- Ochthebius bifoveolatus Waltl, 1835^{i c g}
- Ochthebius biincisus Perkins, 1980^{i c g}
- Ochthebius bisinuatus Perkins, 1980^{i c g}
- Ochthebius boeotianus (Ienistea, 1988)^{i c g}
- Ochthebius bonnairei Guillebeau, 1896^{i c g}
- Ochthebius borealis Perkins, 1980^{i c g}
- Ochthebius brevicollis (Baudi, 1864)^{i c g}
- Ochthebius brevipennis Perkins, 1980^{i c g}
- Ochthebius browni Perkins, 1980^{i c g}
- Ochthebius bupunctus Perkins, 2011^{i c g}
- Ochthebius caesaraugustae Jäch, Ribera and Aguilera, 1998^{i c g}
- Ochthebius californicus Perkins, 1980^{i c g}
- Ochthebius caligatus Jäch, 2003^{i c g}
- Ochthebius cameroni Balfour-Browne, 1951^{i c g}
- Ochthebius cantabricus Balfour-Browne, 1978^{i c g}
- Ochthebius capicola (Péringuey, 1892)^{i c g}
- Ochthebius caspius Jäch, 1992^{i c g}
- Ochthebius castellanus Jäch, 2003^{i c g}
- Ochthebius caucasicus Kuwert, 1887^{i c g}
- Ochthebius caudatus Frivaldszky, 1883^{i c g}
- Ochthebius celatus Jäch, 1989^{i c g}
- Ochthebius championi (Jäch, 1989)^{i c g}
- Ochthebius chappuisi Orchymont, 1948^{i c g}
- Ochthebius ciffidilis Ferro, 1984^{i c g}
- Ochthebius ciliciae Jäch, 1989^{i c g}
- Ochthebius colchicus Janssens, 1963^{i c g}
- Ochthebius colveranus (Ferro, 1979)^{i c g}
- Ochthebius confusus Ferro, 1990^{i c g}
- Ochthebius coomani Orchymont, 1925^{i c g}
- Ochthebius corcyraeus Jäch, 1990^{i c g}
- Ochthebius corrugatus Rosenhauer, 1856^{i c g}
- Ochthebius corsicus Sainte-Claire Deville, 1908^{i c g}
- Ochthebius costatellus Reitter, 1897^{i c g}
- Ochthebius costipennis Fall, 1901^{i c g}
- Ochthebius crassalus Perkins, 1980^{i c g}
- Ochthebius crenatus Hatch, 1965^{i c g}
- Ochthebius crenulatus Mulsant and Rey, 1850^{i c g}
- Ochthebius cribricollis LeConte, 1850^{i c g}
- Ochthebius cuprescens Guillebeau, 1893^{i c g}
- Ochthebius cupricollis Sahlberg, 1903^{i c g}
- Ochthebius cyprensis Kuwert, 1890^{i c g}
- Ochthebius cyrenaeus Ferro, 1985^{i c g}
- Ochthebius czwalinae Kuwert, 1887^{i c g}
- Ochthebius czwalinai Kuwert, 1887^{g}
- Ochthebius dalmatinus Ganglbauer, 1904^{i c g}
- Ochthebius danjo Nakane, 1990^{i c g}
- Ochthebius darius Balfour-Browne, 1979^{i c g}
- Ochthebius decianus Orchymont, 1942^{i c g}
- Ochthebius delgadoi Jäch, 1994^{i c g}
- Ochthebius delhiensis Jäch, 1992^{i c g}
- Ochthebius delyi (Hebauer, 1990)^{i c g}
- Ochthebius dentifer Rey, 1885^{i c g}
- Ochthebius depressionis Jäch, 1991^{i c g}
- Ochthebius depressus Sahlberg, 1900^{i c g}
- Ochthebius diazi Jäch, 1999^{i c g}
- Ochthebius difficilis Mulsant, 1844^{i c g}
- Ochthebius dilatatus Stephens, 1829^{i c g}
- Ochthebius dilucidus Orchymont, 1940^{i c g}
- Ochthebius discretus LeConte, 1878^{i c g}
- Ochthebius eburneus Sahlberg, 1900^{i c g}
- Ochthebius elburzi Ferro, 1987^{i c g}
- Ochthebius elisae Sahlberg, 1900^{i c g}
- Ochthebius emilianus (Ienistea, 1988)^{i c g}
- Ochthebius empedocles Jäch, 1999^{i c g}
- Ochthebius endroedyi Perkins, 2011^{i c g}
- Ochthebius enicoceroides Jäch, 2003^{i c g}
- Ochthebius erzerumi Kuwert, 1887^{i c g}
- Ochthebius evanescens Sahlberg, 1875^{i c g}
- Ochthebius exiguus Jäch, 2003^{i c g}
- Ochthebius exsculptus (Germar, 1824)^{i c g}
- Ochthebius extremus (Péringuey, 1892)^{i c g}
- Ochthebius eyrei Jäch, 1990^{i c g}
- Ochthebius falcatus Jäch, 1991^{i c g}
- Ochthebius fallacioviridis Ienistea, 1988^{i c g}
- Ochthebius fausti Sharp, 1887^{i c g}
- Ochthebius faustinus Orchymont, 1940^{i c g}
- Ochthebius ferganensis Jäch, 1990^{i c g}
- Ochthebius ferroi Fresneda, Lagar & Hernando, 1993^{g}
- Ochthebius figueroi Garrido Gonzalez, Valladares Diez and Régil Cueto, 1991^{i c g}
- Ochthebius fissicollis Janssens, 1969^{i c g}
- Ochthebius flagellifer Jäch, 2003^{i c g}
- Ochthebius flavipes Dalla Torre, 1877^{i c g}
- Ochthebius flexus Pu, 1958^{i c g}
- Ochthebius flumineus Orchymont, 1937^{i c g}
- Ochthebius formosanus Jäch, 1998^{i c g}
- Ochthebius fossulatus Mulsant, 1844^{i c g}
- Ochthebius foveolatus Germar, 1824^{i c g}
- Ochthebius freyi Orchymont, 1940^{i c g}
- Ochthebius fujianensis Jäch, 2003^{i c g}
- Ochthebius furcatus Pu, 1958^{i c g}
- Ochthebius gagliardii Orchymont, 1940^{i c g}
- Ochthebius gauthieri Peyerimhoff, 1924^{i c g}
- Ochthebius gayosoi Jach, 2001^{g}
- Ochthebius gereckei Jäch, 1993^{i c g}
- Ochthebius gestroi Gridelli, 1926^{g}
- Ochthebius gibbosus (Germar, 1824)^{i c g}
- Ochthebius glaber Montes and Soler, 1988^{i c g}
- Ochthebius gonggashanensis Jäch, 2003^{i c g}
- Ochthebius grandipennis Fairmaire, 1879^{i c g}
- Ochthebius granulatus (Mulsant, 1844)^{i c g}
- Ochthebius granulinus Perkins, 2011^{i c g}
- Ochthebius granulosus Jäch and Delgado, 2014^{i c g}
- Ochthebius gruwelli Perkins, 1980^{i c g}
- Ochthebius guangdongensis Jäch, 2003^{i c g}
- Ochthebius haberfelneri Reitter, 1890^{i c g}
- Ochthebius haelii Ferro, 1983^{i c g}
- Ochthebius hainanensis Jäch, 2003^{i c g}
- Ochthebius hajeki Jäch and Delgado, 2014^{i c g}
- Ochthebius halbherri (Reitter, 1890)^{i c g}
- Ochthebius halophilus Ertorun and Jäch, 2014^{i c g}
- Ochthebius hanshebaueri Jäch, 1994^{i c g}
- Ochthebius hasegawai Nakane and Matsui, 1986^{i c g}
- Ochthebius hatayensis Jäch, 1989^{i c g}
- Ochthebius hauseri Jäch, 1992^{i c g}
- Ochthebius hayashii Jäch and Delgado, 2014^{i c g}
- Ochthebius hebaueri Jäch, 1983^{i c g}
- Ochthebius heeri (Wollaston, 1854)^{i c g}
- Ochthebius hellenicus (Ienistea, 1988)^{i c g}
- Ochthebius hesperides Balfour-Browne, 1976^{i c g}
- Ochthebius heydeni Kuwert, 1887^{i c g}
- Ochthebius hibernus Perkins, 1980^{i c g}
- Ochthebius himalayae Jäch, 1989^{i c g}
- Ochthebius hivae Jäch, Irani and Delgado, 2013^{i c g}
- Ochthebius hofratvukovitsi Jäch, 1994^{i c g}
- Ochthebius hokkaidensis Jäch, 1998^{i c g}
- Ochthebius huberti Jäch, 1989^{i c g}
- Ochthebius hungaricus Endrödy-Younga, 1967^{i c g}
- Ochthebius hyblaemajoris Ferro, 1986^{i c g}
- Ochthebius ilanensis Jäch, 1998^{i c g}
- Ochthebius imbensimbi Jäch, 1989^{i c g}
- Ochthebius immaculatus Breit, 1908^{i c g}
- Ochthebius impressipennis Rey, 1886^{i c g}
- Ochthebius inconspicuus Jäch, 1991^{i c g}
- Ochthebius indicus (Ienistea, 1988)^{i c g}
- Ochthebius inelegans Jäch, 2002^{i c g}
- Ochthebius inermis Sharp, 1884^{i c g}
- Ochthebius innexus Balfour-Browne, 1951^{i c g}
- Ochthebius insidiosus Jäch, 1999^{i c g}
- Ochthebius interruptus LeConte, 1852^{i c g}
- Ochthebius involatus Perkins, 2011^{i c g}
- Ochthebius iranicus Balfour-Browne, 1979^{i c g}
- Ochthebius irenae Ribera and Millán, 1999^{i c g}
- Ochthebius italicus Jäch, 1990^{i c g}
- Ochthebius iternuptialis Jach, 2001^{g}
- Ochthebius izmiranus (Ienistea, 1988)^{i c g}
- Ochthebius jaimei Delgado and Jäch, 2007^{i c g}
- Ochthebius janssensi Ferro, 1983^{i c g}
- Ochthebius japonicus Jäch, 1998^{i c g}
- Ochthebius javieri Jäch, 2000^{i c g}
- Ochthebius jengi Jäch, 1998^{i c g}
- Ochthebius jermakovi Orchymont, 1933^{i c g}
- Ochthebius jilanzhui Jäch, 2003^{i c g}
- Ochthebius joosti Jäch, 1992^{i c g}
- Ochthebius judemaesi Delgado and Jäch, 2007^{i c g}
- Ochthebius kaninensis Poppius, 1909^{i c g}
- Ochthebius karasui Ferro, 1986^{i c g}
- Ochthebius khnzoriani Janssens, 1974^{i c g}
- Ochthebius khuzestanicus Ferro, 1982^{i c g}
- Ochthebius kieneri Jäch, 1999^{i c g}
- Ochthebius kiesenwetteri Kuwert, 1887^{i c g}
- Ochthebius kirschenhoferi Jäch, 1994^{i c g}
- Ochthebius klapperichi Jäch, 1989^{i c g}
- Ochthebius kosiensis Champion, 1920^{i c g}
- Ochthebius kurdistanicus Jäch, 1989^{i c g}
- Ochthebius kuwerti Reitter, 1897^{i c g}
- Ochthebius lacustatta Jäch, 1991^{i c g}
- Ochthebius laevisculptus Reitter, 1901^{i c g}
- Ochthebius lanarotis Ferro, 1985^{i c g}
- Ochthebius lanuginosus Reiche and Saulcy, 1856^{i c g}
- Ochthebius lapidicola Wollaston, 1864^{i c g}
- Ochthebius laticollis Pankow, 1986^{i c g}
- Ochthebius latinorum (Ienistea, 1988)^{i c g}
- Ochthebius lecontei Perkins, 1980^{i c g}
- Ochthebius lederi Jäch, 1990^{i c g}
- Ochthebius leechi Wood and Perkins, 1978^{i c g}
- Ochthebius legionensis (Hebauer and Valladares Diez, 1985)^{i c g}
- Ochthebius lejolisii Mulsant and Rey, 1861^{i c g}
- Ochthebius lenensis Poppius, 1907^{i c g}
- Ochthebius lenkoranus Reitter, 1885^{i c g}
- Ochthebius levantinus Jäch, 1989^{i c g}
- Ochthebius libanus Jäch and Díaz, 1992^{i c g}
- Ochthebius limbicollis Reitter, 1885^{i c g}
- Ochthebius lineatus LeConte, 1852^{i c g b}
- Ochthebius lividipennis Peyron, 1858^{i c g}
- Ochthebius lobatus Pu, 1958^{i c g}
- Ochthebius lobicollis Rey, 1885^{i c g}
- Ochthebius lucanus Ferro, 1990^{i c g}
- Ochthebius lurugosus Jäch, 1998^{i c g}
- Ochthebius maculatus Reiche, 1869^{i c g}
- Ochthebius madli Jäch, 1992^{i c g}
- Ochthebius madrensis Perkins, 1980^{i c g}
- Ochthebius magnannulatus Delgado and Jäch, 2009^{i c g}
- Ochthebius malaganus Ienistea, 1988^{i c g}
- Ochthebius mamagri (Shatrovskiy, 1989)^{i c g}
- Ochthebius marginalis Rey, 1886^{i c g}
- Ochthebius marijanmatoki Jäch and Delgado, 2015^{i c g}
- Ochthebius marinus (Paykull, 1798)^{i c g b} (marine moss beetle)
- Ochthebius maroccanus Jäch, 1992^{i c g}
- Ochthebius martini Fall, 1919^{i c g}
- Ochthebius masatakasatoi Jäch, 1992^{i c g}
- Ochthebius matsudae Jäch and Delgado, 2014^{i c g}
- Ochthebius mauretanicus Jäch, 1990^{i c g}
- Ochthebius maxfischeri Jäch, 1999^{i c g}
- Ochthebius mediterraneus (Ienistea, 1988)^{i c g}
- Ochthebius melanescens (Dalla Torre, 1877)^{i c g}
- Ochthebius meridionalis Rey, 1885^{i c g}
- Ochthebius merinidicus Ferro, 1985^{i c g}
- Ochthebius mesoamericanus Perkins, 1980^{i c g}
- Ochthebius metallescens Rosenhauer, 1847^{i c g}
- Ochthebius metallicus Orchymont, 1942^{i c g}
- Ochthebius metarius Orchymont, 1942^{i c g}
- Ochthebius metellus Orchymont, 1942^{i c g}
- Ochthebius mexcavatus Perkins, 1980^{i c g}
- Ochthebius mexicanus Perkins, 1980^{i c g}
- Ochthebius micans Balfour-Browne, 1951^{i c g}
- Ochthebius mimicus Brown, 1933^{i c g}
- Ochthebius minabensis Ferro, 1983^{i c g}
- Ochthebius minervius Orchymont, 1940^{i c g}
- Ochthebius minimus (Fabricius, 1792)^{i c g}
- Ochthebius mongolensis Janssens, 1967^{i c g}
- Ochthebius mongolicus Janssens, 1967^{i c g}
- Ochthebius montanus Frivaldszky, 1881^{i c g}
- Ochthebius montenegrinus (Ganglbauer, 1901)^{i c g}
- Ochthebius montesi Ferro, 1984^{i c g}
- Ochthebius monticola Orchymont, 1948^{i c g}
- Ochthebius monychus Orchymont, 1941^{i c g}
- Ochthebius morettii Pirisinu, 1974^{i c g}
- Ochthebius mutatus Jäch, 1991^{i c g}
- Ochthebius nakanei Matsui, 1986^{i c g}
- Ochthebius namibiensis Perkins and Balfour-Browne, 1994^{i c g}
- Ochthebius nanus Stephens, 1829^{i c g}
- Ochthebius naxianus (Ienistea, 1988)^{i c g}
- Ochthebius nepalensis Jäch, 1989^{i c g}
- Ochthebius nigrasperulus Jäch, 2003^{i c g}
- Ochthebius nilssoni Hebauer, 1986^{i c g}
- Ochthebius nipponicus Jäch, 1998^{i c g}
- Ochthebius nitidipennis (Champion, 1920)^{i c g}
- Ochthebius nobilis Villa and Villa, 1835^{i c g}
- Ochthebius nonaginta Jäch, 1998^{i c g}
- Ochthebius normandi Jäch, 1992^{i c g}
- Ochthebius notabilis Rosenhauer, 1856^{i c g}
- Ochthebius obesus Jäch, 2003^{i c g}
- Ochthebius obscurometallescens Ienistea, 1988^{i c g}
- Ochthebius octofoveatus Pu, 1958^{i c g}
- Ochthebius oezkani Jäch, Kasapoglu and Erman, 2003^{i c g}
- Ochthebius olicinium Jäch, 1990^{i c g}
- Ochthebius opacipennis Champion, 1920^{i c g}
- Ochthebius opacus Baudi, 1882^{i c g}
- Ochthebius orbus Perkins, 1980^{i c g}
- Ochthebius orientalis Janssens, 1962^{i c g}
- Ochthebius otavalensis Anderson, 1983^{i c g}
- Ochthebius ovatus Jäch, 1989^{i c g}
- Ochthebius pacificus Perkins, 1980^{i c g}
- Ochthebius pagotrichus Perkins and Balfour-Browne, 1994^{i c g}
- Ochthebius pakistanicus Delgado and Jäch, 2009^{i c g}
- Ochthebius pallidulus Kuwert, 1887^{i c g}
- Ochthebius parki Jäch and Delgado, 2014^{i c g}
- Ochthebius parvannulatus Delgado and Jäch, 2009^{i c g}
- Ochthebius pauli Perkins, 1980^{i c g}
- Ochthebius pedalis Balfour-Browne, 1954^{i c g}
- Ochthebius pedicularius Kuwert, 1887^{i c g}
- Ochthebius pedroi Jäch, 2000^{i c g}
- Ochthebius peisonis Ganglbauer, 1901^{i c g}
- Ochthebius perdurus Reitter, 1899^{i c g}
- Ochthebius peregrinus Orchymont, 1941^{i c g}
- Ochthebius perkinsi Pankow, 1986^{i c g}
- Ochthebius perpusillus Ferro, 1985^{i c g}
- Ochthebius pierottii Ferro, 1979^{i c g}
- Ochthebius pilosus Waltl, 1835^{i c g}
- Ochthebius pliginskiyi Jäch, 1990^{i c g}
- Ochthebius ponticus Ienistea, 1956^{i c g}
- Ochthebius poweri Rye, 1869^{i c g}
- Ochthebius praetermissus Jäch, 1991^{i c g}
- Ochthebius preissi Jach, 2001^{g}
- Ochthebius pretneri Jäch, 1999^{i c g}
- Ochthebius pseudoviridis Ienistea, 1988^{i c g}
- Ochthebius puberulus Reitter, 1885^{i c g}
- Ochthebius pudilaceris Ferro, 1982^{i c g}
- Ochthebius pui Perkins, 1979^{i c g}
- Ochthebius punctatoides Jäch, 1994^{i c g}
- Ochthebius punctatus Stephens, 1829^{i c g}
- Ochthebius puncticollis LeConte, 1852^{i c g b}
- Ochthebius pusillus Stephens, 1835^{i c g}
- Ochthebius putnamensis Blatchley, 1910^{i c g}
- Ochthebius quadricollis Mulsant, 1844^{i c g}
- Ochthebius quadrifossulatus Waltl, 1835^{i c g}
- Ochthebius quadrifoveolatus Wollaston, 1854^{i c g}
- Ochthebius queenslandicus Hansen, 1998^{i c g}
- Ochthebius ragusae Kuwert, 1887^{i c g}
- Ochthebius recticulus Perkins, 1980^{i c g}
- Ochthebius rectilobus Jäch, 1989^{i c g}
- Ochthebius rectus LeConte, 1878^{i c g}
- Ochthebius rectusalsus Perkins, 1980^{i c g}
- Ochthebius recurvatus Jäch, 1991^{i c g}
- Ochthebius regimbarti Knisch, 1924^{i c g}
- Ochthebius remotus Reitter, 1885^{i c g}
- Ochthebius reticulocostus Perkins, 1980^{i c g}
- Ochthebius richmondi Perkins, 1980^{i c g}
- Ochthebius rivalis Champion, 1920^{i c g}
- Ochthebius rivibelli Jäch, 1990^{i c g}
- Ochthebius romanicus Ienistea, 1968^{i c g}
- Ochthebius rotundatus Jäch, 2003^{i c g}
- Ochthebius rubripes Boheman, 1860^{i c g}
- Ochthebius rugulosus Wollaston, 1857^{i c g}
- Ochthebius saboorii Skale and Jäch, 2009^{i c g}
- Ochthebius salebrosus Pu, 1958^{i c g}
- Ochthebius salinarius Balfour-Browne, 1954^{i c g}
- Ochthebius salinator Peyerimhoff, 1924^{i c g}
- Ochthebius sanabrensis Valladares and Jäch, 2008^{i c g}
- Ochthebius sardus Jäch, 1990^{i c g}
- Ochthebius satoi Nakane, 1965^{i c g}
- Ochthebius sattmanni (Jäch, 1992)^{i c g}
- Ochthebius schneideri Kuwert, 1887^{i c g}
- Ochthebius schoedli Jäch, 1999^{i c g}
- Ochthebius schuberti Jäch, 1999^{i c g}
- Ochthebius scintillans Champion, 1920^{i c g}
- Ochthebius scitulus Ferro, 1982^{i c g}
- Ochthebius sculptoides Perkins, 1980^{i c g}
- Ochthebius sculpturatus Sahlberg, 1900^{i c g}
- Ochthebius sculptus LeConte, 1878^{i c g}
- Ochthebius semisericeus Sainte-Claire Deville, 1914^{i c g}
- Ochthebius semotus d'Orchymont, 1942^{g}
- Ochthebius sempronius Orchymont, 1942^{i c g}
- Ochthebius sennius d'Orchymont, 1942^{g}
- Ochthebius serpentinus Jäch, 1989^{i c g}
- Ochthebius serratus Rosenhauer, 1856^{i c g}
- Ochthebius sexfoveatus Champion, 1920^{i c g}
- Ochthebius sharpi Jäch, 1992^{i c g}
- Ochthebius sichuanensis Jäch, 2003^{i c g}
- Ochthebius siculus Kuwert, 1887^{i c g}
- Ochthebius sidanus Orchymont, 1942^{i c g}
- Ochthebius sierrensis Perkins, 1980^{i c g}
- Ochthebius silfverbergi Jäch, 1992^{i c g}
- Ochthebius similis Sharp, 1882^{i c g}
- Ochthebius sitiensis Perkins, 2011^{i c g}
- Ochthebius smyrnensis Sahlberg, 1908^{i c g}
- Ochthebius spanglerorum Wood and Perkins, 1978^{i c g}
- Ochthebius spatulus Balfour-Browne, 1954^{i c g}
- Ochthebius speculator Jäch, 1991^{i c g}
- Ochthebius spinasus Perkins and Balfour-Browne, 1994^{i c g}
- Ochthebius stastnyi Jäch, 2003^{i c g}
- Ochthebius striatus (Castelnau, 1840)^{i c g}
- Ochthebius strigoides Jäch, 1998^{i c g}
- Ochthebius strigosus Champion, 1921^{i c g}
- Ochthebius stygialis Orchymont, 1937^{i c g}
- Ochthebius subaeneus Janssens, 1967^{i c g}
- Ochthebius subinteger Mulsant and Rey, 1861^{i c g}
- Ochthebius subopacus Reitter, 1885^{i c g}
- Ochthebius subpictus Wollaston, 1857^{i c g}
- Ochthebius subviridis Ienistea, 1988^{i c g}
- Ochthebius sulpuris Jäch, 1989^{i c g}
- Ochthebius sumatrensis Jäch, 2001^{i c g}
- Ochthebius tacapasensis Ferro, 1983^{i c g}
- Ochthebius tadilatus Jäch, 1990^{i c g}
- Ochthebius thermalis Janssens, 1965^{i c g}
- Ochthebius thraciae Jäch, 1990^{i c g}
- Ochthebius tivelunus Ferro, 1984^{i c g}
- Ochthebius trapezuntinus Jäch, 1999^{i c g}
- Ochthebius tubus Perkins, 1980^{i c g}
- Ochthebius tudmirensis Jäch, 1997^{i c g}
- Ochthebius tunisicus Jäch, 1997^{i c g}
- Ochthebius turcicus Jäch, 1989^{i c g}
- Ochthebius turcmeniae Jäch, 1990^{i c g}
- Ochthebius turkestanus Kuwert, 1892^{i c g}
- Ochthebius uniformis Perkins, 1980^{i c g}
- Ochthebius unimaculatus Pu, 1958^{i c g}
- Ochthebius urbanelliae (Audisio et al., 2009)^{i c g}
- Ochthebius uskubensis Hebauer, 1986^{i c g}
- Ochthebius ustaoglui Topkara, Jäch and Kasapoglu, 2011^{i c g}
- Ochthebius vedovai Ferro, 1987^{i c g}
- Ochthebius velutinus Fairmaire, 1883^{i c g}
- Ochthebius verrucosus Pu, 1942^{i c g}
- Ochthebius viganoi Pirisinu, 1974^{i c g}
- Ochthebius virens Jäch, 1992^{i c g}
- Ochthebius virgula Ferro, 1986^{i c g}
- Ochthebius viridescens Ienistea, 1988^{i c g}
- Ochthebius viridis Peyron, 1858^{i c g}
- Ochthebius wangmiaoi Jäch, 2003^{i c g}
- Ochthebius wewalkai Jäch, 1984^{i c g}
- Ochthebius wuzhishanensis Jäch, 2003^{i c g}
- Ochthebius yaanensis Jäch, 2003^{i c g}
- Ochthebius yoshitomii Jäch and Delgado, 2014^{i c g}
- Ochthebius yumiae Matsui and Delgado, 1997^{i c g}
- Ochthebius yunnanensis Orchymont, 1925^{i c g}
- Ochthebius zugmayeri Kniz, 1909^{i c g}
- Ochthebius zulu Perkins, 2011^{i c g}

Data sources: i = ITIS, c = Catalogue of Life, g = GBIF, b = Bugguide.net
