= Neochthebius vandykei =

Scientific classification
- Domain: Eukaryota
- Kingdom: Animalia
- Phylum: Arthropoda
- Class: Insecta
- Order: Coleoptera
- Suborder: Polyphaga
- Infraorder: Staphyliniformia
- Family: Hydraenidae
- Genus: Neochthebius
- Species: N. vandykei

Binomial name
- Neochthebius vandykei (Knisch, 1924)

Synonyms
- Ochthebius vandykei Knisch, 1924

Species of beetle

Neochthebius vandykei is a species of minute moss beetle in the family Hydraenidae. It is found in North America.
