= Limnebius aluta =

Scientific classification
- Domain: Eukaryota
- Kingdom: Animalia
- Phylum: Arthropoda
- Class: Insecta
- Order: Coleoptera
- Suborder: Polyphaga
- Infraorder: Staphyliniformia
- Family: Hydraenidae
- Genus: Limnebius
- Species: L. aluta

Binomial name
- Limnebius aluta (Bedel, 1881)

Species of beetle

Limnebius aluta is a species of beetle belonging to the family Hydraenidae.

It is native to Europe.
