= Gymnochthebius seminole =

Scientific classification
- Domain: Eukaryota
- Kingdom: Animalia
- Phylum: Arthropoda
- Class: Insecta
- Order: Coleoptera
- Suborder: Polyphaga
- Infraorder: Staphyliniformia
- Family: Hydraenidae
- Genus: Gymnochthebius
- Species: G. seminole

Binomial name
- Gymnochthebius seminole Perkins 1980

Species of beetle

Gymnochthebius seminole is a species of tiny beetle in the family Hydraenidae. It is known only from a single adult male specimen collected in a "sawgrass-mangrove area" along the Snake Bight Trail north of Flamingo in Everglades National Park, Florida on 27 August 1965. This specimen was 1.20 millimetres (0.047 in) long, with a relatively robust body. It is most similar to G. oppositus. The species is named for the Seminole people of Florida. The species is named for the Seminole tribe of Everglades State. Some of the oldest beetle fossils are hydraenids, which date back to the Lower Jurassic.
