= Limnebius alutaceus =

Scientific classification
- Kingdom: Animalia
- Phylum: Arthropoda
- Class: Insecta
- Order: Coleoptera
- Suborder: Polyphaga
- Infraorder: Staphyliniformia
- Family: Hydraenidae
- Genus: Limnebius
- Species: L. alutaceus

Binomial name
- Limnebius alutaceus (Casey, 1886)

Synonyms
- Limnebius columbianus Brown, 1932; Limnebius congener (Casey, 1886)

Species of beetle

Limnebius alutaceus is a species of minute moss beetle in the family Hydraenidae. It is found in North America.
