= Ochthebius lineatus =

Scientific classification
- Domain: Eukaryota
- Kingdom: Animalia
- Phylum: Arthropoda
- Class: Insecta
- Order: Coleoptera
- Suborder: Polyphaga
- Infraorder: Staphyliniformia
- Family: Hydraenidae
- Genus: Ochthebius
- Species: O. lineatus

Binomial name
- Ochthebius lineatus LeConte, 1852

Synonyms
- Ochthebius milleri Hatch, 1965

Species of beetle

Ochthebius lineatus is a species of minute moss beetle in the family Hydraenidae. It is found in Central America, North America, and South America.
