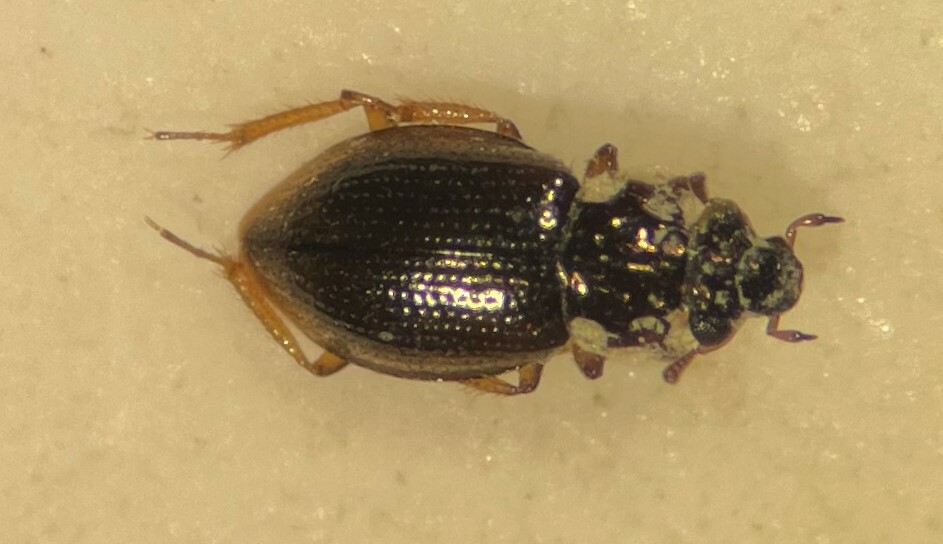

Scientific classification
- Domain: Eukaryota
- Kingdom: Animalia
- Phylum: Arthropoda
- Class: Insecta
- Order: Coleoptera
- Suborder: Polyphaga
- Infraorder: Staphyliniformia
- Family: Hydraenidae
- Genus: Gymnochthebius
- Species: G. fossatus

Binomial name
- Gymnochthebius fossatus (LeConte, 1855)

Synonyms
- Ochthebius fossatus LeConte, 1855; Ochthebius tuberculatus LeConte, 1878

= Gymnochthebius fossatus =

Species of beetle

Gymnochthebius fossatus is a species of minute moss beetle in the family Hydraenidae. It is found in the Caribbean Sea, Central America, North America, and South America.
