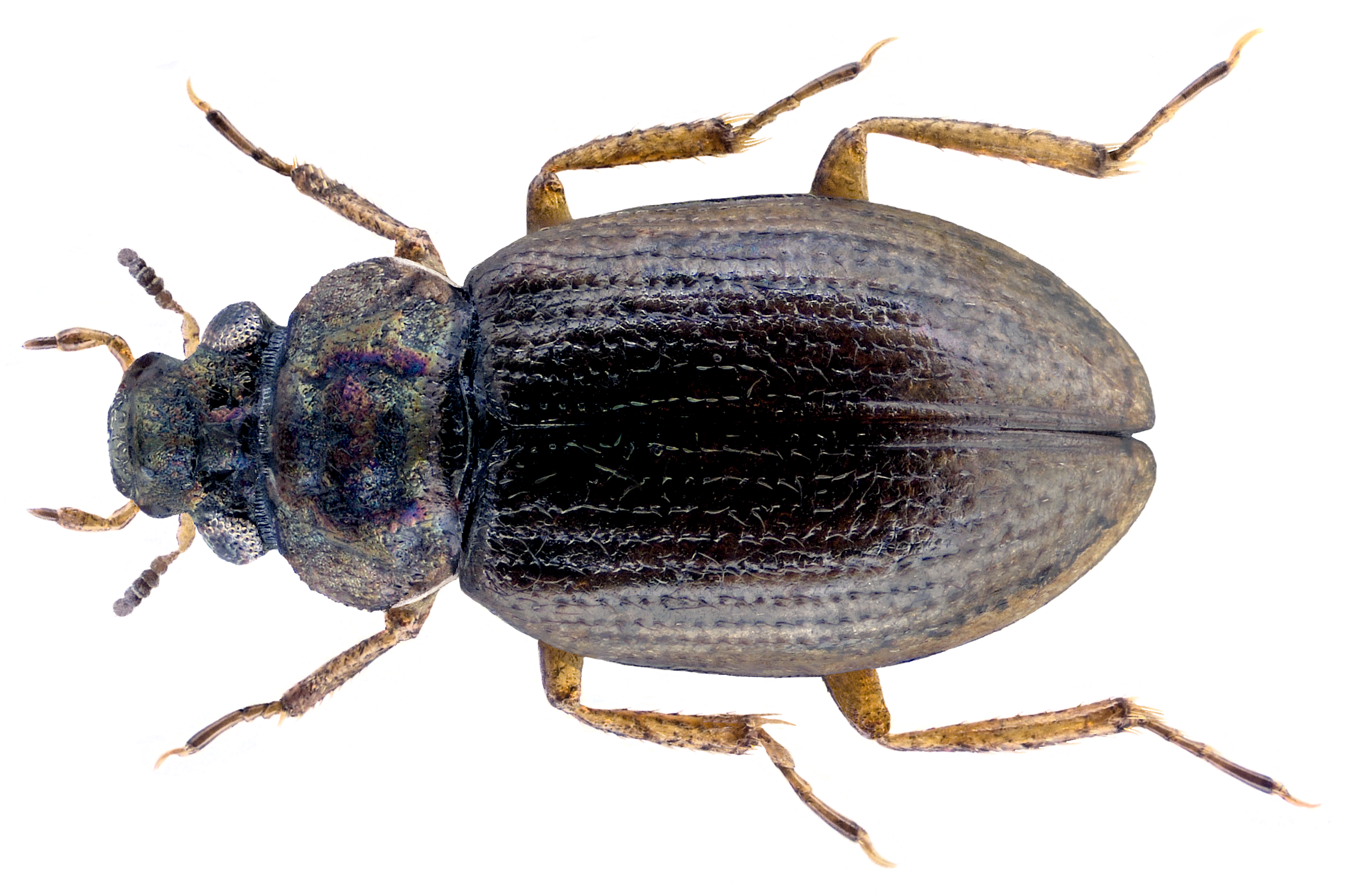

Scientific classification
- Kingdom: Animalia
- Phylum: Arthropoda
- Clade: Pancrustacea
- Class: Insecta
- Order: Coleoptera
- Suborder: Polyphaga
- Infraorder: Staphyliniformia
- Family: Hydraenidae
- Genus: Ochthebius
- Species: O. marinus

Binomial name
- Ochthebius marinus (Paykull, 1798)

Synonyms
- Ochthebius holmbergi Mannerheim, 1853

= Ochthebius marinus =

Species of beetle

Ochthebius marinus, the marine moss beetle, is a species of minute moss beetle in the family Hydraenidae. It is found in Europe and Northern Asia (excluding China), North America, and Southern Asia.
