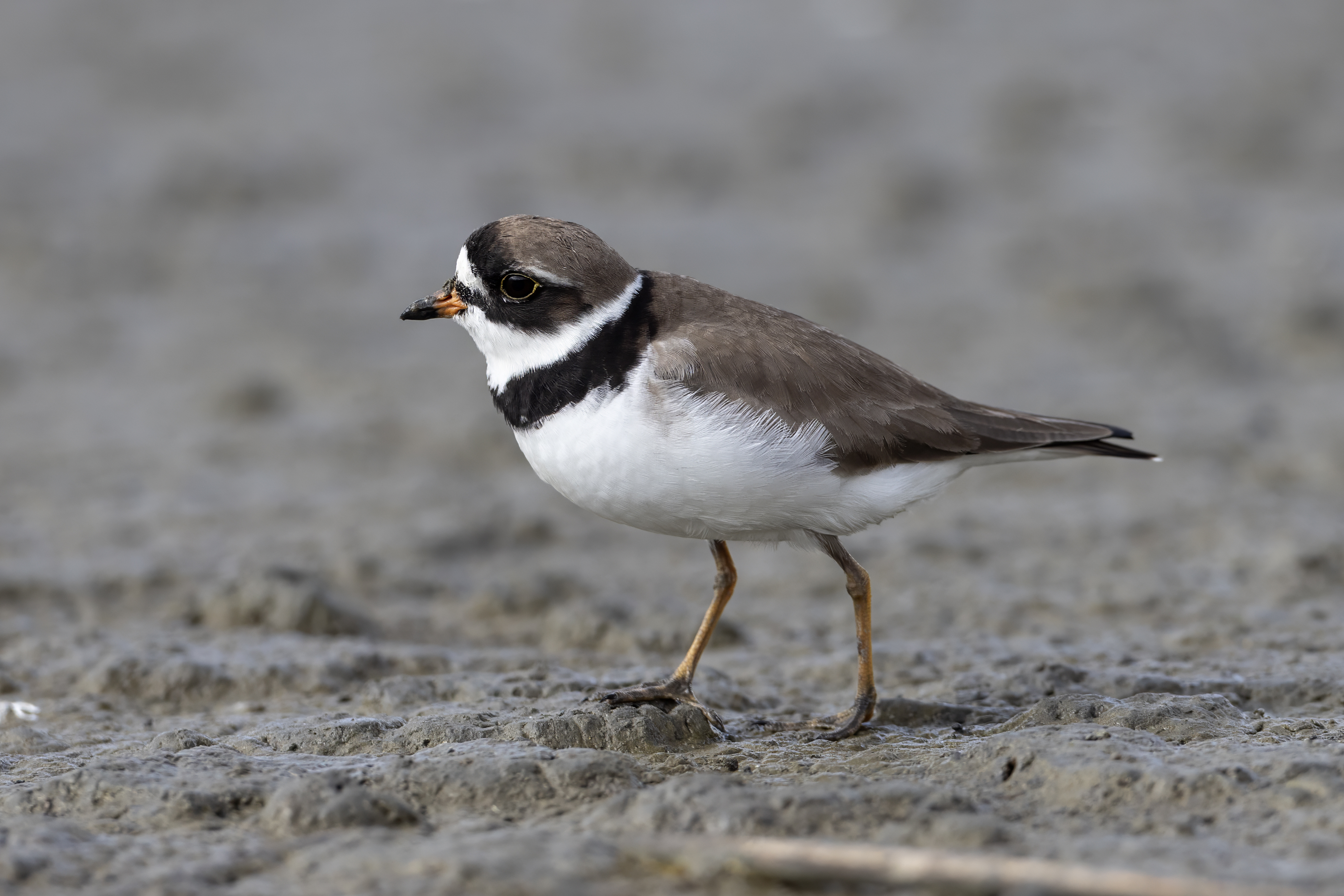
- Breeding plumage in Heislerville, New Jersey.
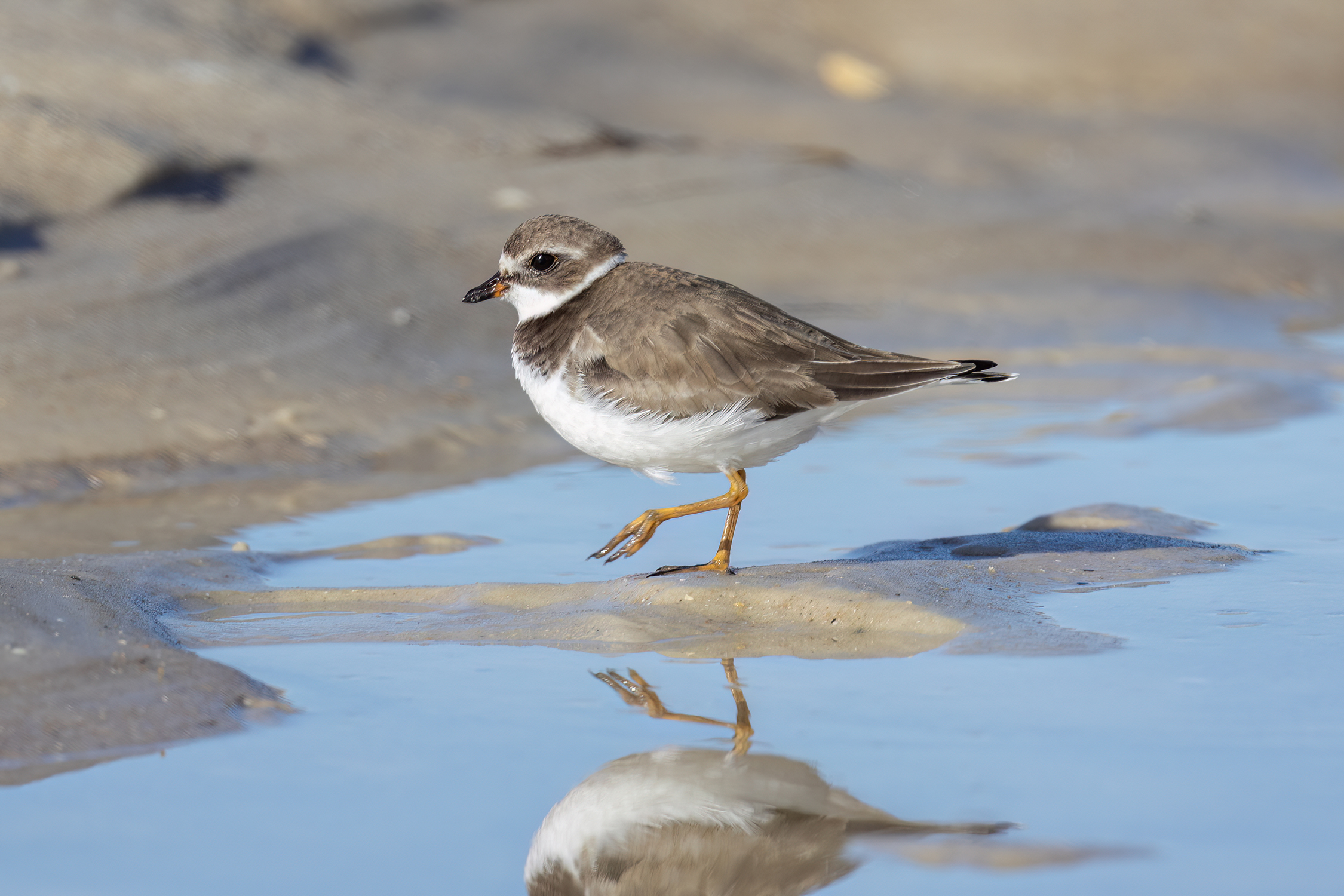
- Nonbreeding plumage

Conservation status
- Least Concern (IUCN 3.1)

Scientific classification
- Kingdom: Animalia
- Phylum: Chordata
- Class: Aves
- Order: Charadriiformes
- Family: Charadriidae
- Genus: Charadrius
- Species: C. semipalmatus

Binomial name
- Charadrius semipalmatus Bonaparte, 1825

Synonyms
- Charadrius hiaticula semipalmatus

= Semipalmated plover =

Species of bird

The semipalmated plover (Charadrius semipalmatus) is a small plover. Charadrius is a Late Latin word for a yellowish bird mentioned in the fourth-century Vulgate. It derives from Ancient Greek kharadrios a bird found in ravines and river valleys (kharadra, "ravine"). The specific semipalmatus is Latin and comes from semi, "half" and palma, "palm". Like the English name, this refers to its only partially webbed feet.

== Description ==
This species weighs a mean 47.4 g (1.7 oz.) for males and 46.1 g (1.6 oz.) for females, with body masses ranging from 37.6-54.7 g (1.3-1.9 oz.). and measures 17–19 cm (6.7–7.5 in) in length with a 12–13 cm (4.7–5.1 in) mean wing length. Adults have a grey-brown back and wings, a white belly, and a white breast with one black neckband. They have a brown cap, a white forehead, a black mask around the eyes and a short orange and black bill.

Vocalization

== Habitat ==
Their breeding habitat is open ground on beaches or flats across northern Canada and Alaska. They nest on the ground in an open area with little or no plant growth.

They are migratory and winter in coastal areas of the southern United States, the Caribbean and much of South America. They are extremely rare vagrants to western Europe, and have been found in Tierra del Fuego and the Isles of Scilly. Their true status may be obscured by the difficulty in identifying them from the very similar ringed plover of Eurasia, of which it was formerly considered a subspecies.

== Behavior ==
Semipalmated plovers forage for food on beaches, tidal flats and fields, usually by sight. They eat insects (such as the larvae of long-legged and beach flies, larvae of soldier flies and shore flies, mosquitoes, grasshoppers and Ochtebius beetles), spiders, crustaceans (such as isopods, decapods and copepods) and worms (such as polychaetes). They also consume small molluscs including bivalves and gastropods, including snails such as coffee bean snails and Odostomia laevigata. These opportunistic feeders also feed on berries or seeds from grasslands or cultivated fields. This bird resembles the killdeer but is much smaller and has only one band. Since the semipalmated plover nests on the ground, it uses a "broken-wing" display to lure intruders away from the nest, in a display similar to the related killdeer.

== Gallery ==
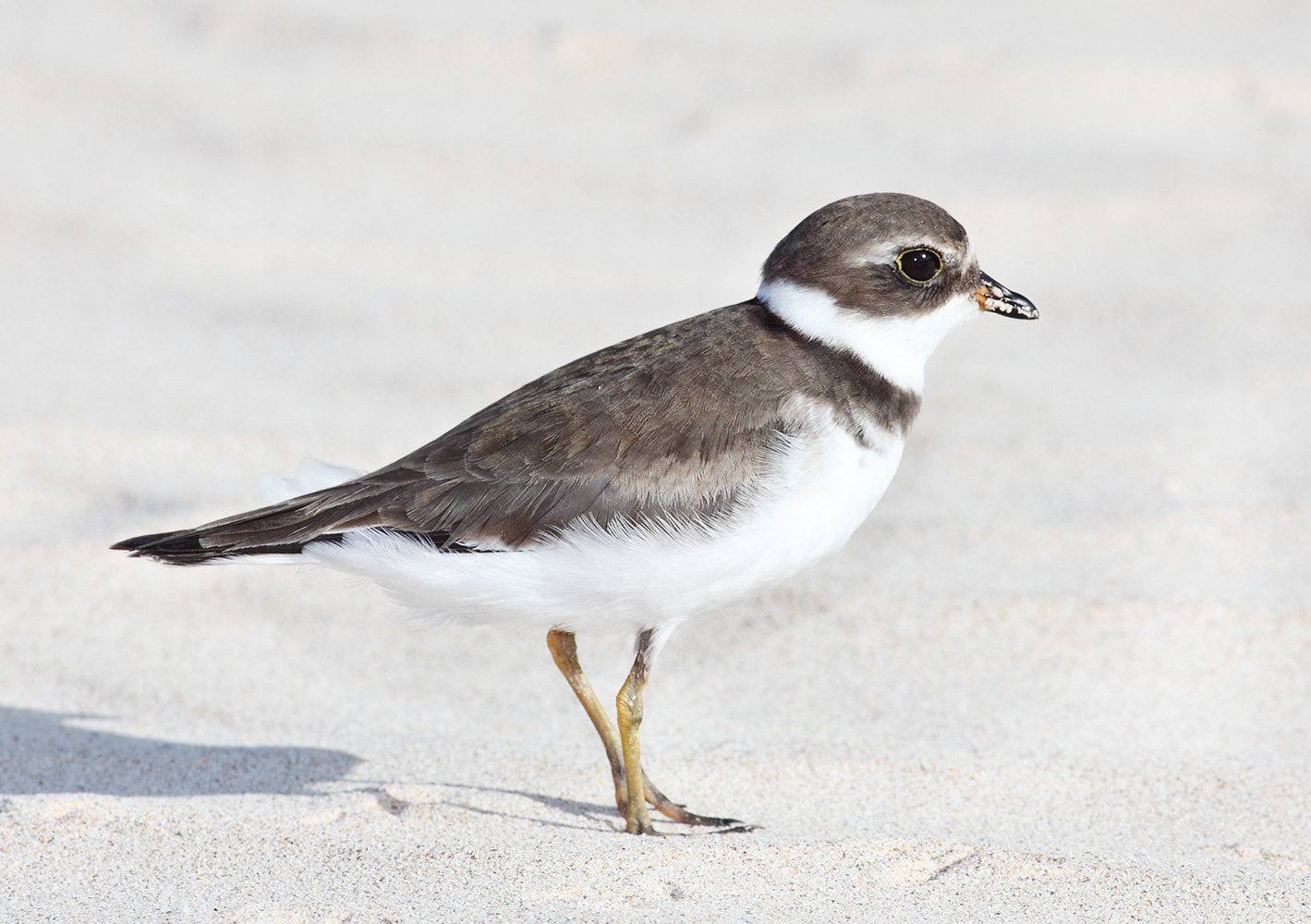
Galápagos Islands

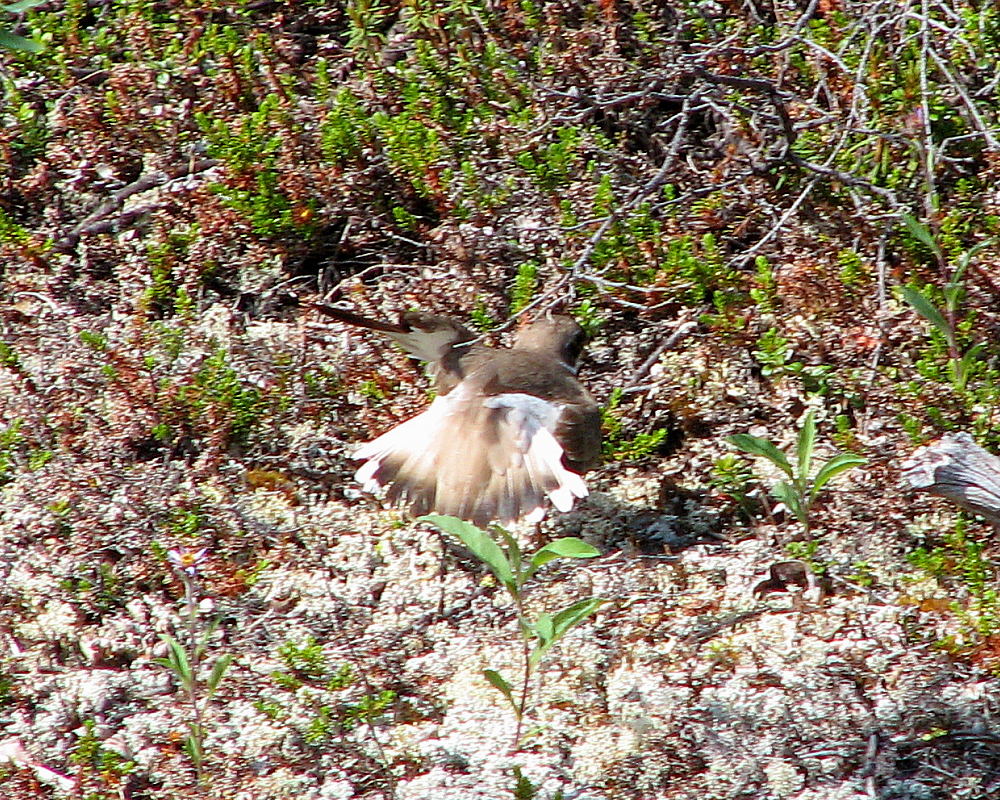
"Broken wing" display

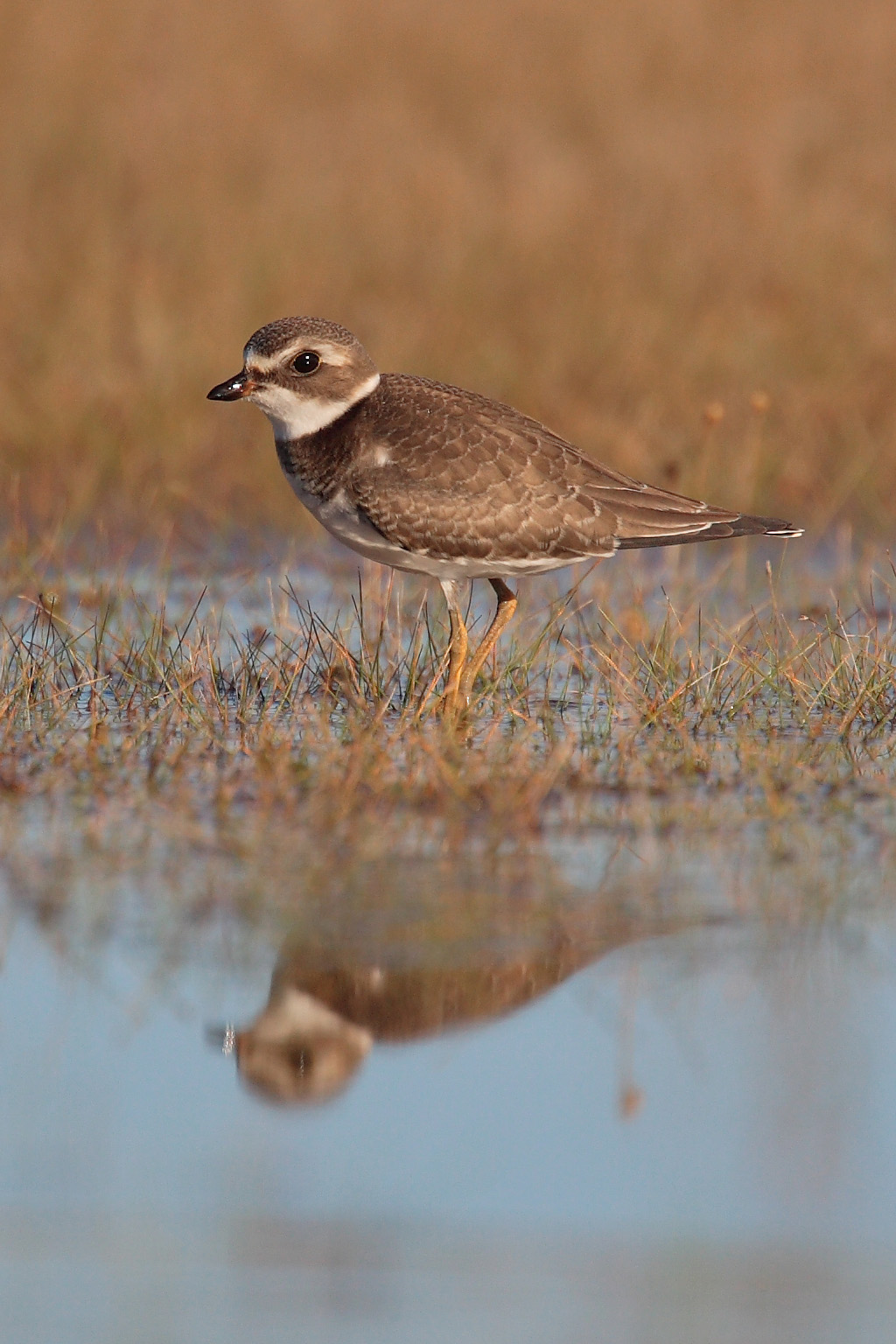
Juvenile

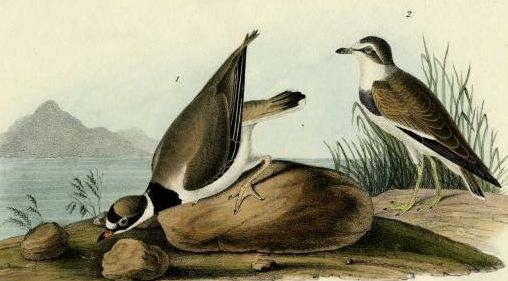
Illustration (John James Audubon)

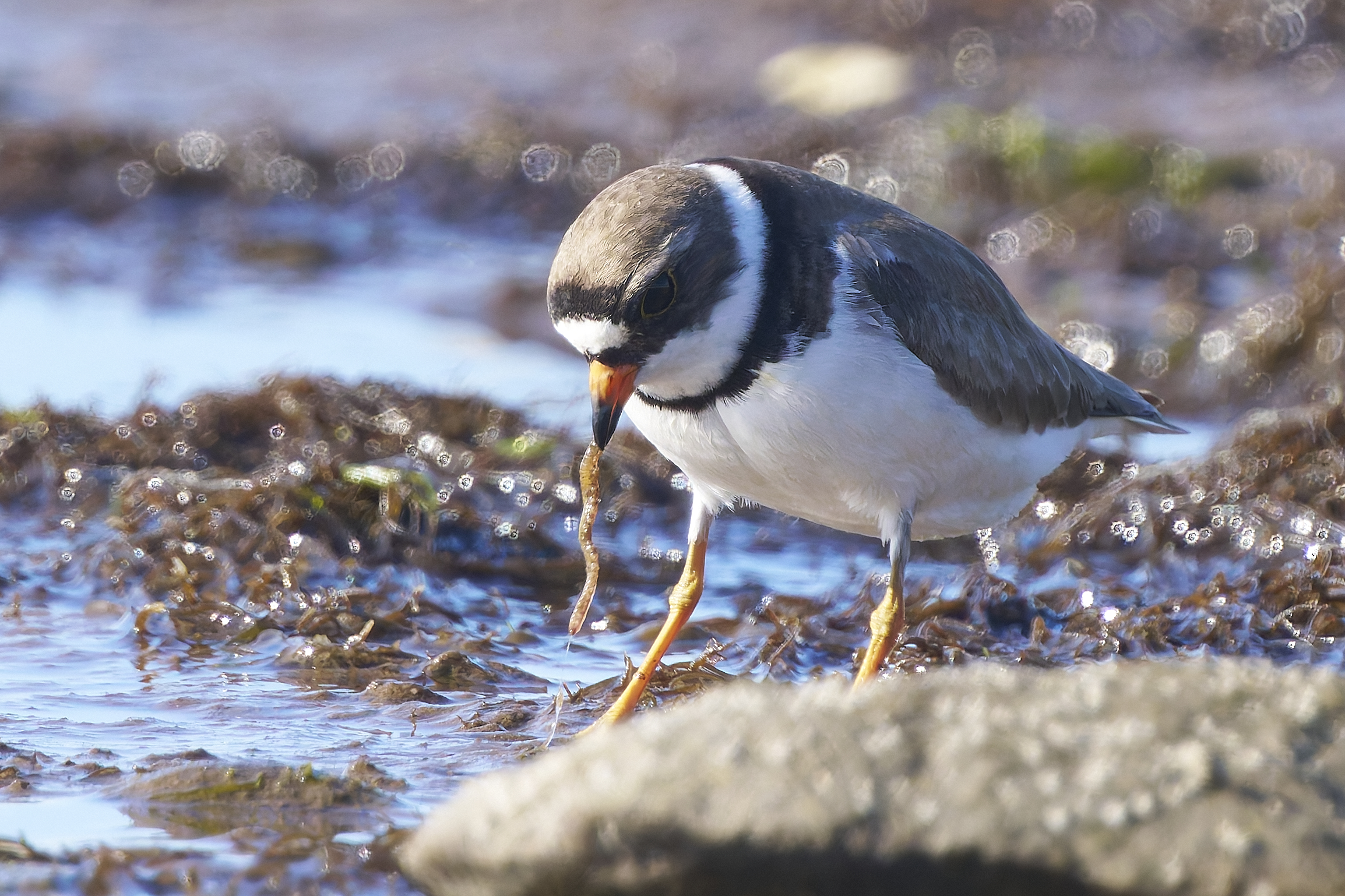
Eating a bristle worm

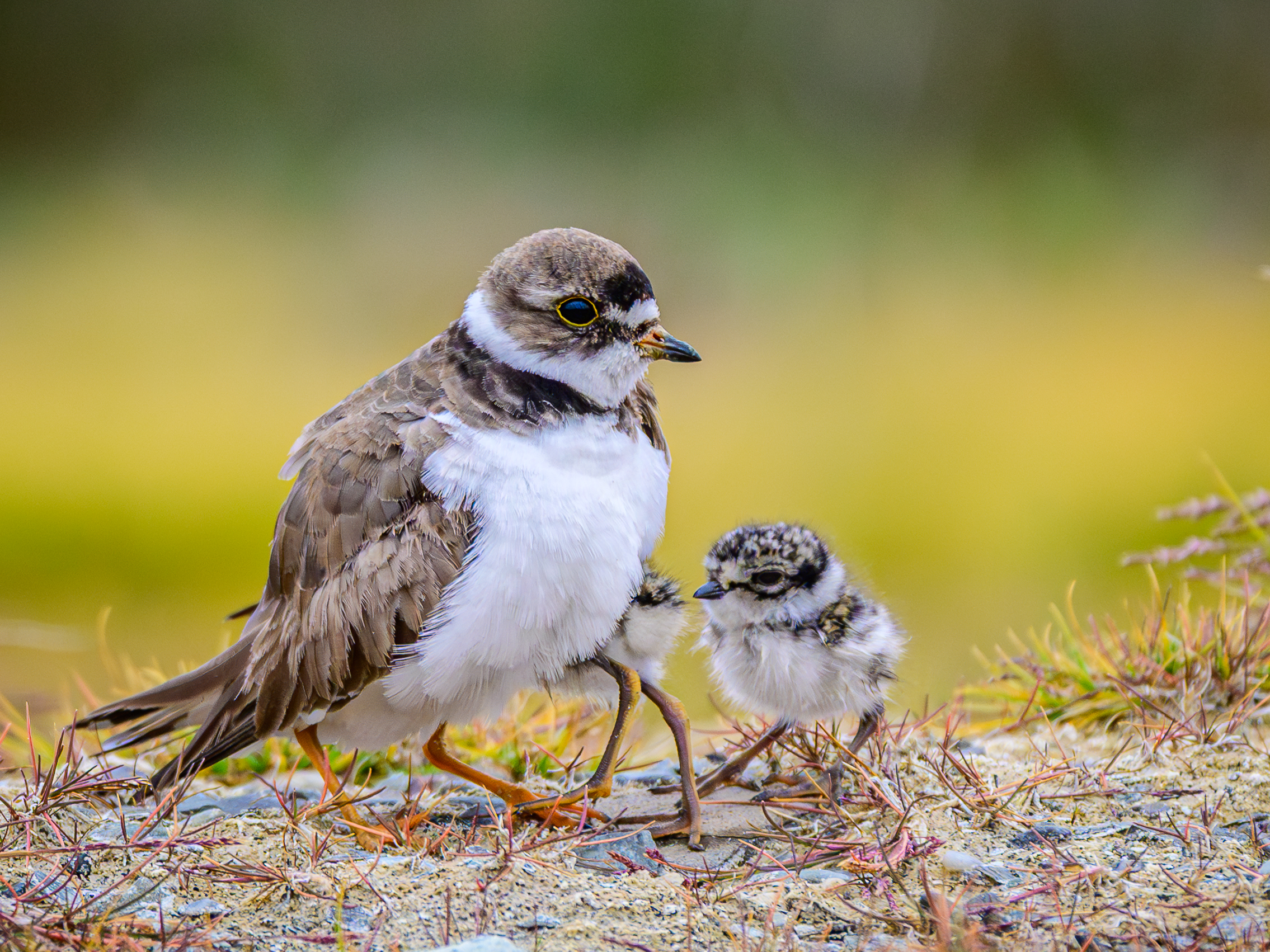
Adult with chicks

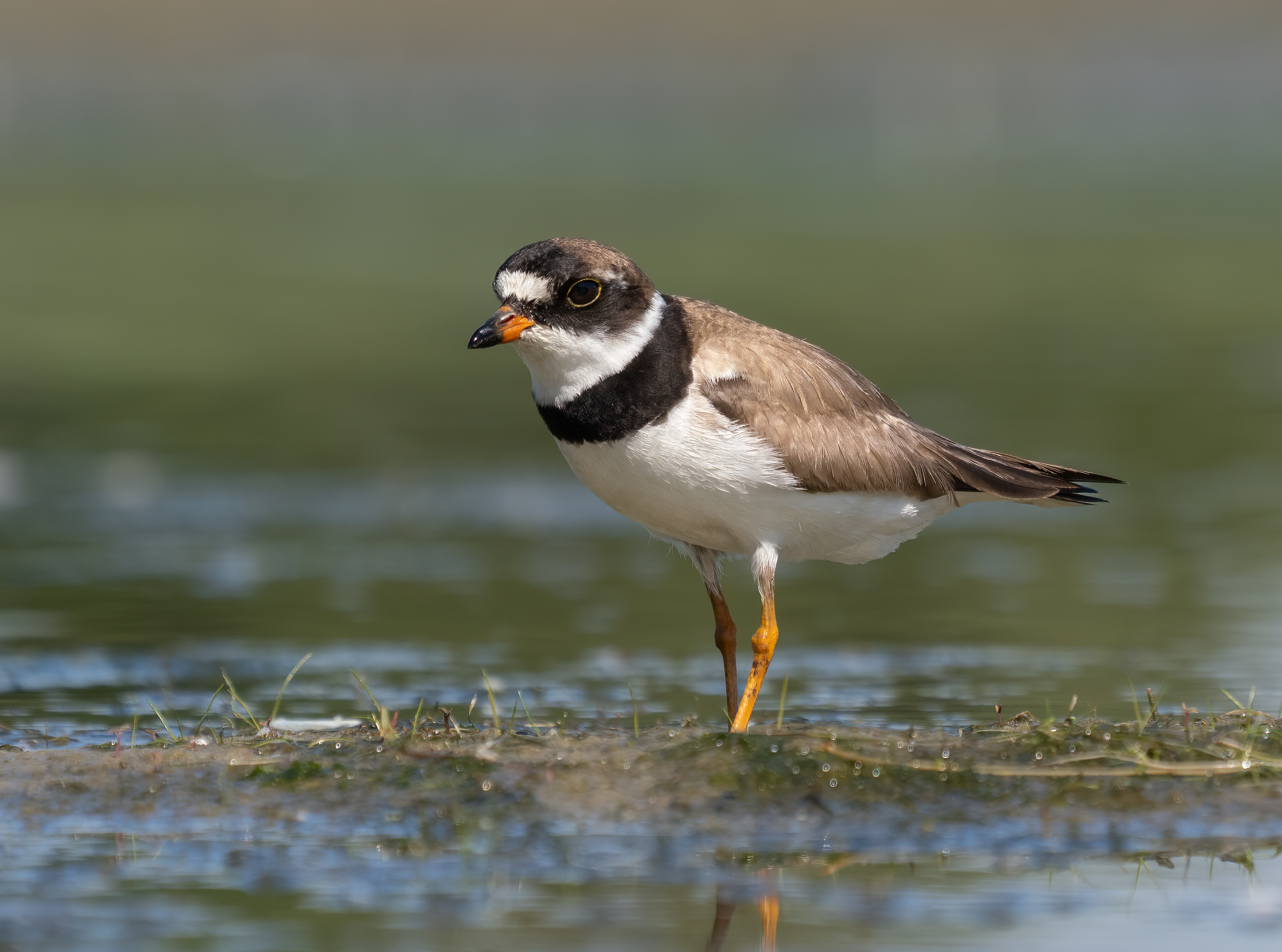
Adult in breeding plumage in New York
