= Ochthebius puncticollis =

Scientific classification
- Domain: Eukaryota
- Kingdom: Animalia
- Phylum: Arthropoda
- Class: Insecta
- Order: Coleoptera
- Suborder: Polyphaga
- Infraorder: Staphyliniformia
- Family: Hydraenidae
- Genus: Ochthebius
- Species: O. puncticollis

Binomial name
- Ochthebius puncticollis LeConte, 1852

Species of beetle

Ochthebius puncticollis is a species of minute moss beetle in the family Hydraenidae. It is found in Central America and North America.
