= Semi-p =

The abbreviated name semi-p could refer to either of the following two North American shorebird species:

- Semipalmated plover
- Semipalmated sandpiper
