= Neochthebius =

Scientific classification
- Domain: Eukaryota
- Kingdom: Animalia
- Phylum: Arthropoda
- Class: Insecta
- Order: Coleoptera
- Suborder: Polyphaga
- Infraorder: Staphyliniformia
- Family: Hydraenidae
- Subfamily: Ochthebiinae
- Genus: Neochthebius; Orchymont, 1932

Genus of beetles

Neochthebius is a genus of minute moss beetles in the family Hydraenidae. There are at least two described species in Neochthebius.

== Species ==
These two species belong to the genus Neochthebius:

- Neochthebius granulosus (Satô, 1963)
- Neochthebius vandykei (Knisch, 1924)
