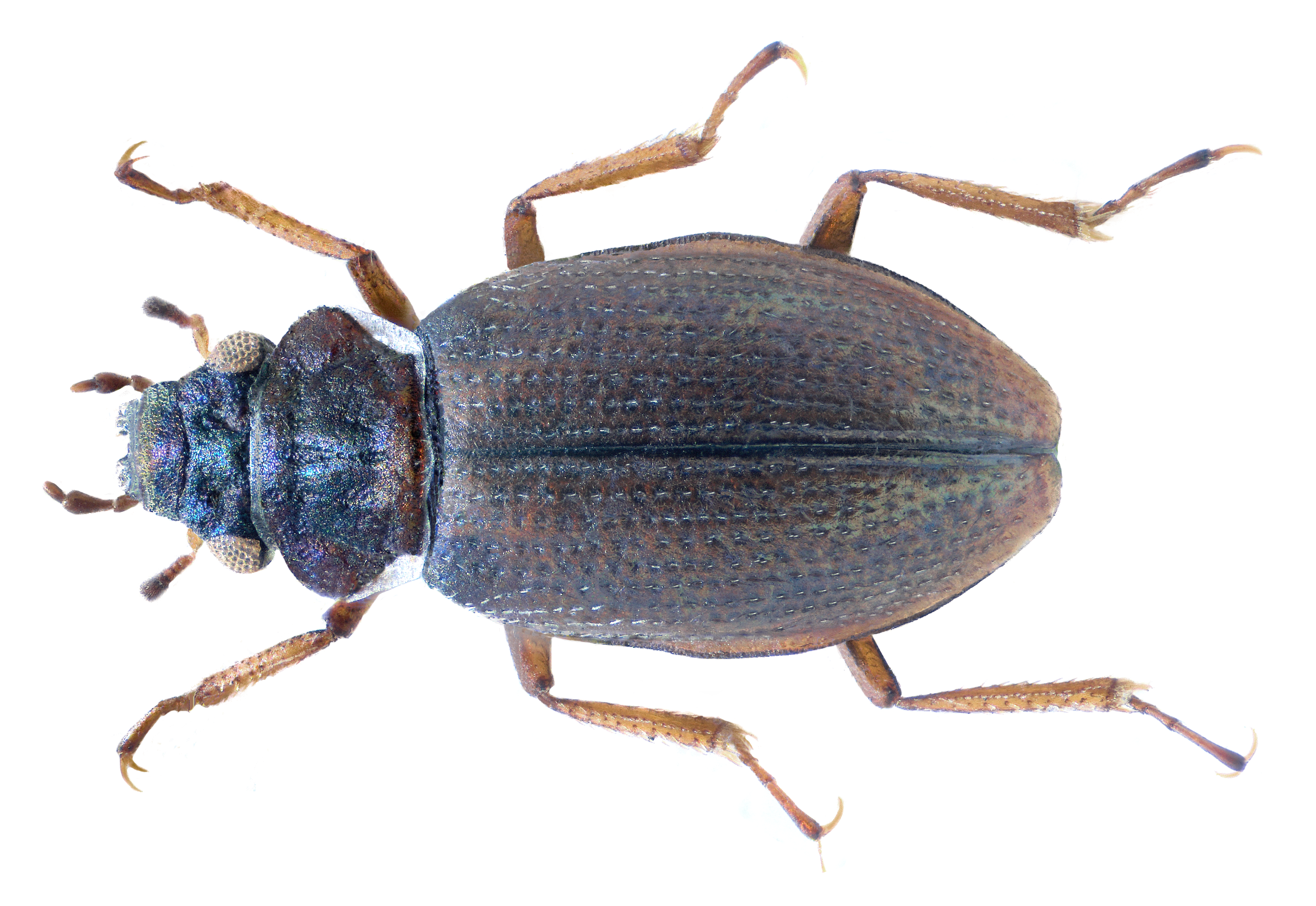
- Ochthebius afghanicus

Scientific classification
- Kingdom: Animalia
- Phylum: Arthropoda
- Clade: Pancrustacea
- Class: Insecta
- Order: Coleoptera
- Suborder: Polyphaga
- Infraorder: Staphyliniformia
- Family: Hydraenidae
- Subfamily: Ochthebiinae; C. G. Thomson, 1860

= Ochthebiinae =

Subfamily of beetles

Ochthebiinae is a subfamily of minute moss beetles in the family Hydraenidae. There are 2 tribes, about 14 genera and more than 650 described species in Ochthebiinae.

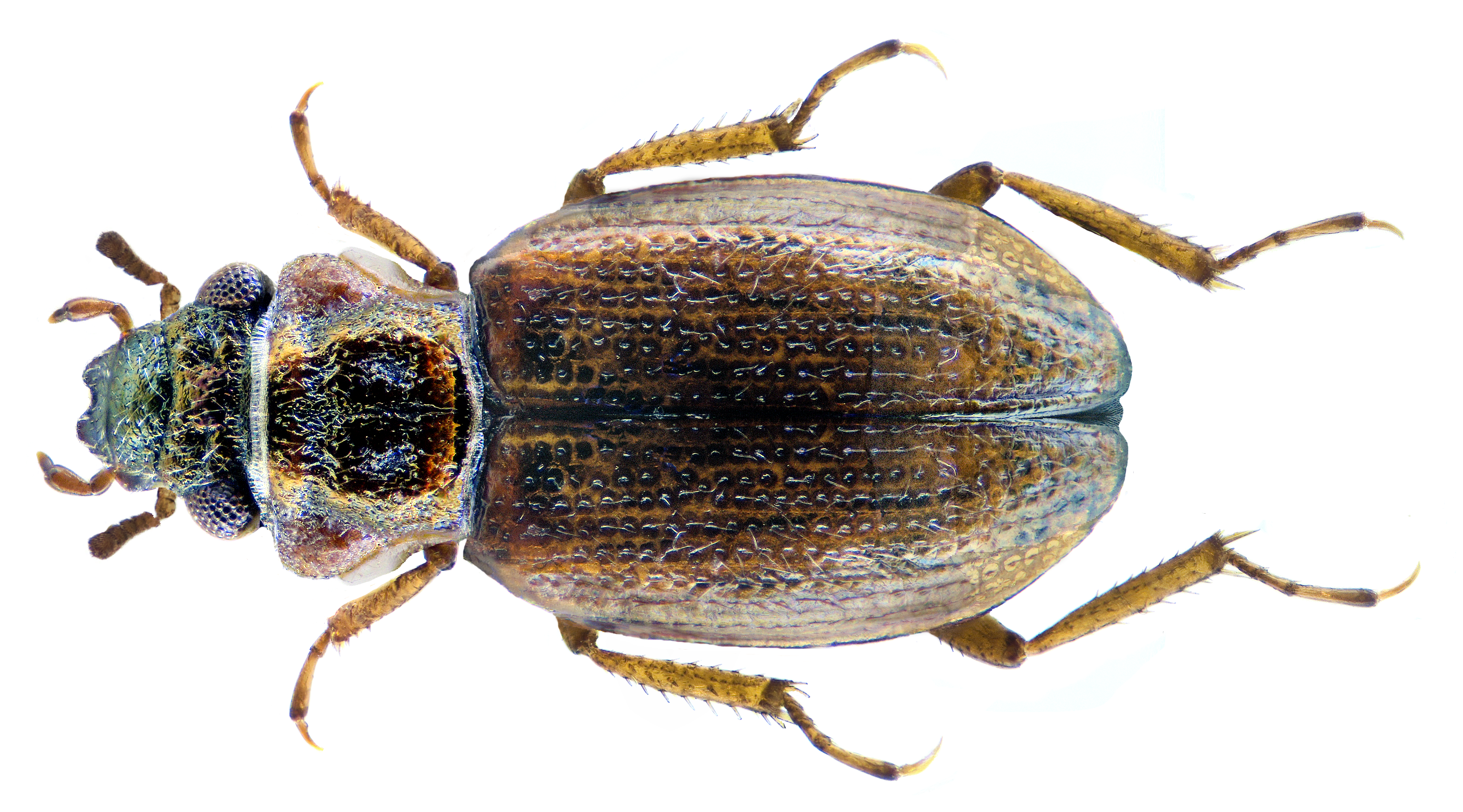
Ochthebius virgula

== Taxonomy ==
These 2 tribes belong to the subfamily Ochthebiinae:

- Ochthebiini Thomson, C. G., 1859
- Ochtheosini Perkins, 1997

These 14 genera belong to the subfamily Ochthebiinae:

- Aulacochthebius Kuwert, 1887
- Edaphobates Jäch & Díaz, 2003
- Ginkgoscia Jäch & Díaz, 2004
- Gymnanthelius Perkins, 1997
- Gymnochthebius Orchymont, 1943
- Hughleechia Perkins, 1981
- Meropathus Enderlein, 1901
- Micragasma Sahlberg, 1900
- Neochthebius Orchymont, 1932
- Ochthebius Leach, 1815
- Ochtheosus Perkins, 1997
- Protochthebius Perkins, 1997
- Tympallopatrum Perkins, 1997
- † Tympanogaster Janssens, 1967
