= Gymnochthebius =

Scientific classification
- Kingdom: Animalia
- Phylum: Arthropoda
- Class: Insecta
- Order: Coleoptera
- Suborder: Polyphaga
- Infraorder: Staphyliniformia
- Family: Hydraenidae
- Subfamily: Ochthebiinae
- Genus: Gymnochthebius; Orchymont, 1943

Genus of beetles

Gymnochthebius is a genus of minute moss beetles in the family Hydraenidae. There are more than 60 described species in Gymnochthebius.

== Species ==
These 64 species belong to the genus Gymnochthebius:

- Gymnochthebius angulonotus Perkins, 2005
- Gymnochthebius angustipennis (Deane, 1931)
- Gymnochthebius australis (Blackburn, 1888)
- Gymnochthebius bacchusi Perkins, 2005
- Gymnochthebius bartyrae Perkins, 1980
- Gymnochthebius benesculptus Perkins, 2005
- Gymnochthebius bisagittatus Perkins, 1980
- Gymnochthebius brisbanensis (Blackburn, 1898)
- Gymnochthebius chilenus (Balfour-Browne, 1971)
- Gymnochthebius clandestinus Perkins, 1980
- Gymnochthebius clarki (Deane, 1931)
- Gymnochthebius compactus Perkins, 1980
- Gymnochthebius coruscus Perkins, 2005
- Gymnochthebius crassipes (Sharp, 1882)
- Gymnochthebius curvus Perkins, 1980
- Gymnochthebius falli Perkins
- Gymnochthebius fischeri (Deane, 1931)
- Gymnochthebius fontinalis Perkins, 2005
- Gymnochthebius fossatus (LeConte, 1855)
- Gymnochthebius francki (Bruch, 1915)
- Gymnochthebius fumosus Perkins, 2005
- Gymnochthebius germaini (Zaitzev, 1908)
- Gymnochthebius hesperius Perkins, 2005
- Gymnochthebius inlineatus Perkins, 2005
- Gymnochthebius ischigualasto Perkins & Archangelsky, 2002
- Gymnochthebius jensenhaarupi (Knisch, 1924)
- Gymnochthebius laevipennis (LeConte, 1878)
- Gymnochthebius levis (Deane, 1933)
- Gymnochthebius lividus (Deane, 1933)
- Gymnochthebius lustrosulcus Perkins, 2005
- Gymnochthebius maureenae Perkins, 1980
- Gymnochthebius minipunctus Perkins, 2005
- Gymnochthebius nanosetus Perkins, 2005
- Gymnochthebius nicki Perkins, 2005
- Gymnochthebius nigriceps Perkins, 2005
- Gymnochthebius nitidus (LeConte, 1850)
- Gymnochthebius notalis (Deane, 1933)
- Gymnochthebius octonarius Perkins, 1980
- Gymnochthebius oppositus Perkins, 1980
- Gymnochthebius papua Perkins, 2005
- Gymnochthebius perlabidus Perkins, 1980
- Gymnochthebius perpunctus Perkins, 2005
- Gymnochthebius peruvianus (Balfour-Browne, 1971)
- Gymnochthebius plesiotypus Perkins, 1980
- Gymnochthebius pluvipennis Perkins, 2005
- Gymnochthebius probus Perkins, 2005
- Gymnochthebius radiatus Perkins, 2005
- Gymnochthebius resplendens Perkins, 2005
- Gymnochthebius reticulatissimus Perkins, 1980
- Gymnochthebius reticulatus (Orchymont, 1943)
- Gymnochthebius rhombus Perkins, 2005
- Gymnochthebius semicylindrus Perkins, 2005
- Gymnochthebius seminole Perkins, 1980
- Gymnochthebius setosus Perkins, 2005
- Gymnochthebius sexplanatus Perkins, 2005
- Gymnochthebius squamifer Perkins, 2005
- Gymnochthebius subsulcatus Perkins, 2005
- Gymnochthebius tectus Perkins, 1980
- Gymnochthebius tenebricosus (Deane, 1931)
- Gymnochthebius topali (Balfour-Browne, 1971)
- Gymnochthebius trilineatus Perkins, 2005
- Gymnochthebius truncatus Perkins, 2005
- Gymnochthebius wattsi Perkins, 2005
- Gymnochthebius weiri Perkins, 2005
