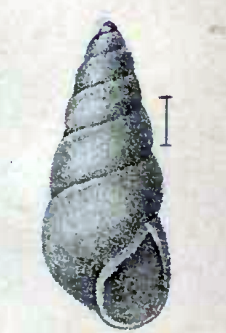
- Drawing of Odostomia laevigata

Scientific classification
- Kingdom: Animalia
- Phylum: Mollusca
- Class: Gastropoda
- Family: Pyramidellidae
- Genus: Odostomia
- Species: O. laevigata

Binomial name
- Odostomia laevigata (d’Orbigny, 1841)

= Odostomia laevigata =

Species of gastropod

Odostomia laevigata, common name the ovoid odostome, is a species of sea snail, a marine gastropod mollusc in the family Pyramidellidae, the pyrams and their allies.

== Description ==
The size of the shell varies between 3 mm and 5 mm. The thin, oblong shell is whitish, smooth and shining. The sixwhorls are slightly convex with their suture opaquely margined. The columella has a very slight fold.

== Distribution ==
This species occurs in the following locations:

- Aruba
- Belize
- Bonaire
- Caribbean Sea
- Cayman Islands
- Colombia
- Cuba
- Curaçao
- Gulf of Mexico
- Hispaniola
- Jamaica
- Lesser Antilles
- Mexico
- Panama
- Puerto Rico
- Venezuela
- the Atlantic Ocean from North Carolina to Brazil and Argentina.
