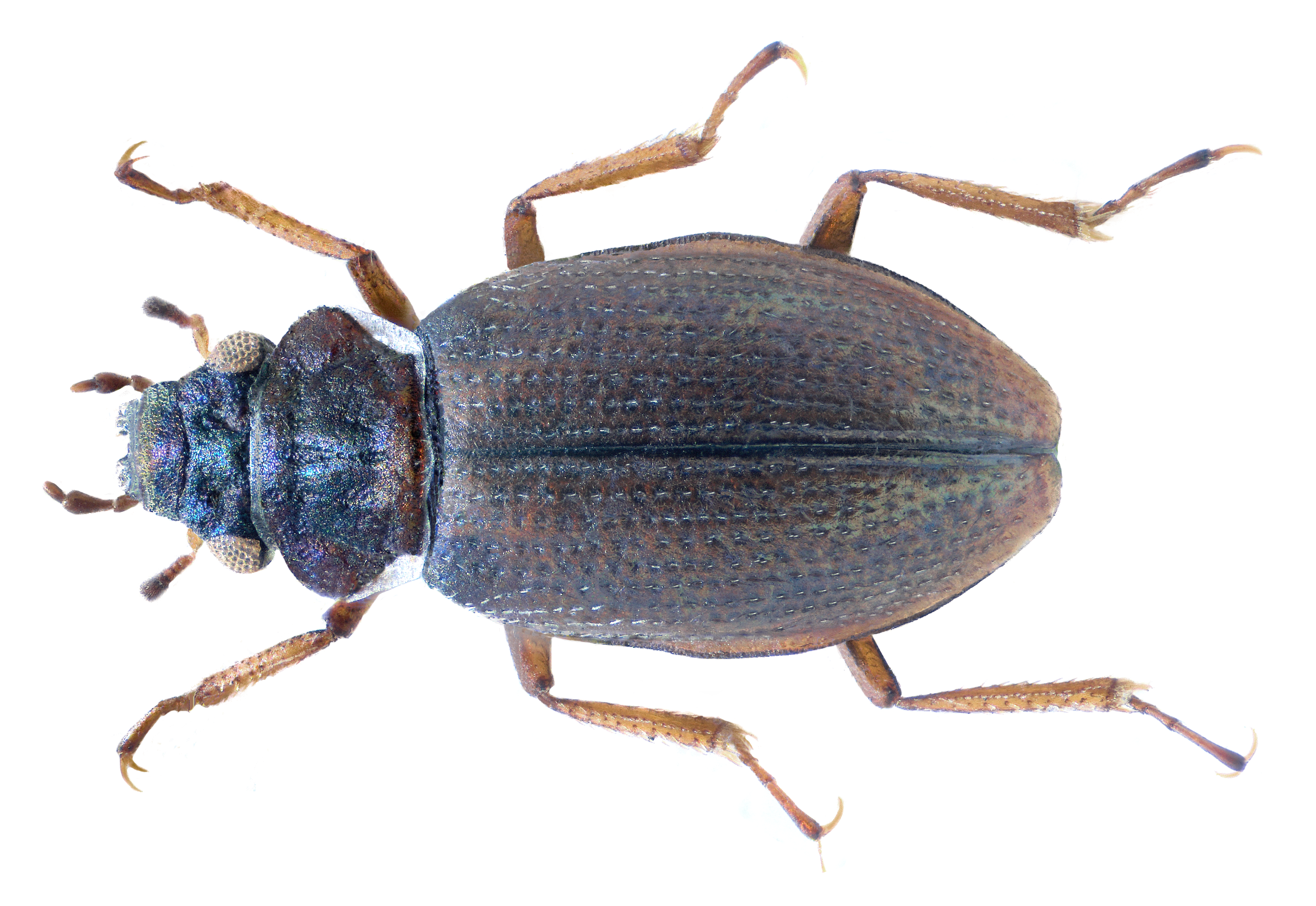
- Ochthebius afghanicus

Scientific classification
- Domain: Eukaryota
- Kingdom: Animalia
- Phylum: Arthropoda
- Class: Insecta
- Order: Coleoptera
- Suborder: Polyphaga
- Infraorder: Staphyliniformia
- Family: Hydraenidae
- Subfamily: Ochthebiinae
- Genus: Ochthebius; Leach, 1815

Subgenera
- Ochthebius (Asiobates) C. G. Thomson, 1859; Ochthebius (Calobius) Wollaston, 1854; Ochthebius (Enicocerus) Stephens, 1829; Ochthebius (Ochthebius) Leach, 1815

Diversity
- at least 460 species

Synonyms
- Ochtebius Thomson, 1859

= Ochthebius =

Genus of beetles

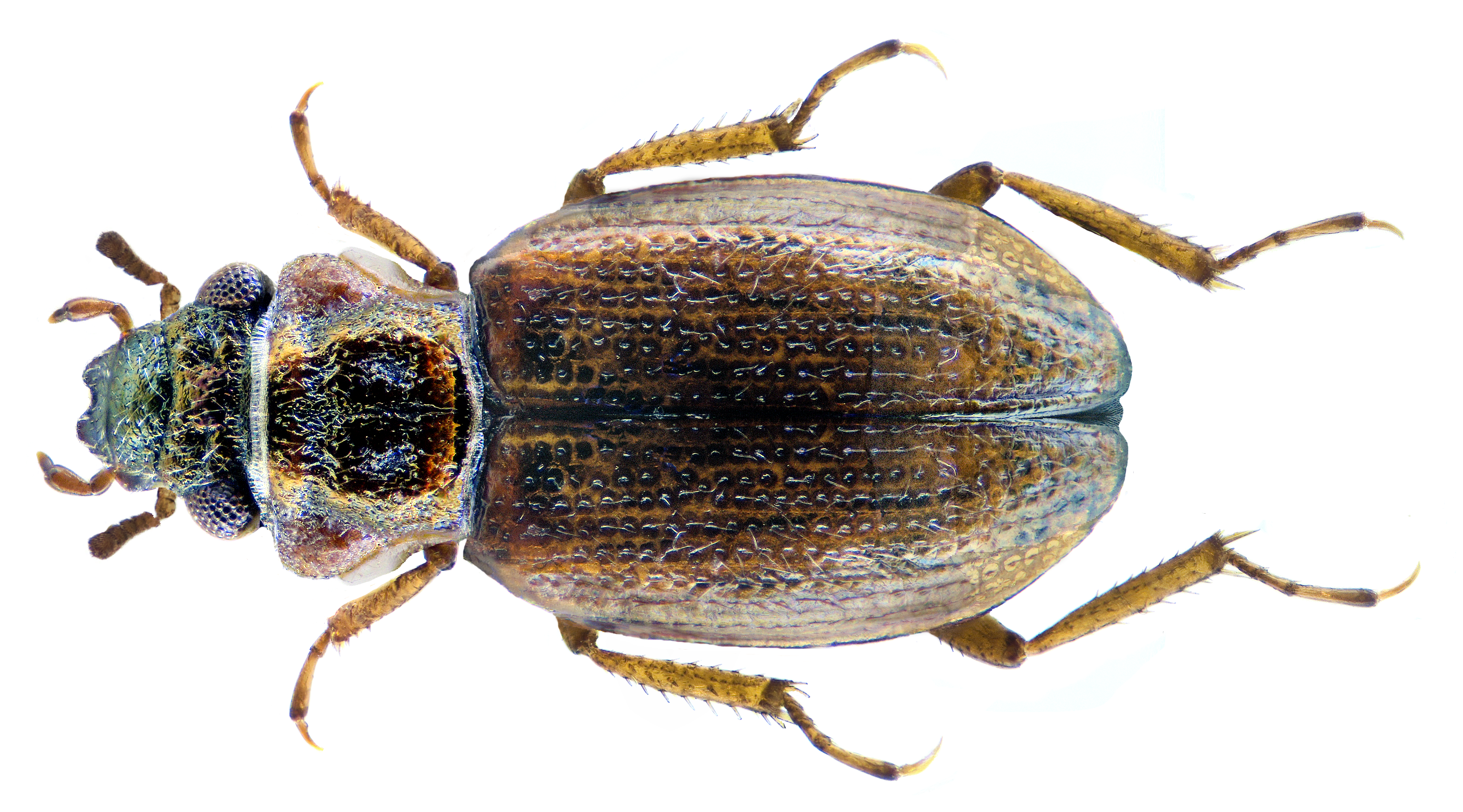
Ochthebius virgula

Ochthebius is a genus of minute moss beetles in the family Hydraenidae. There are at least 460 described species in Ochthebius.

== See also ==
- List of Ochthebius species
