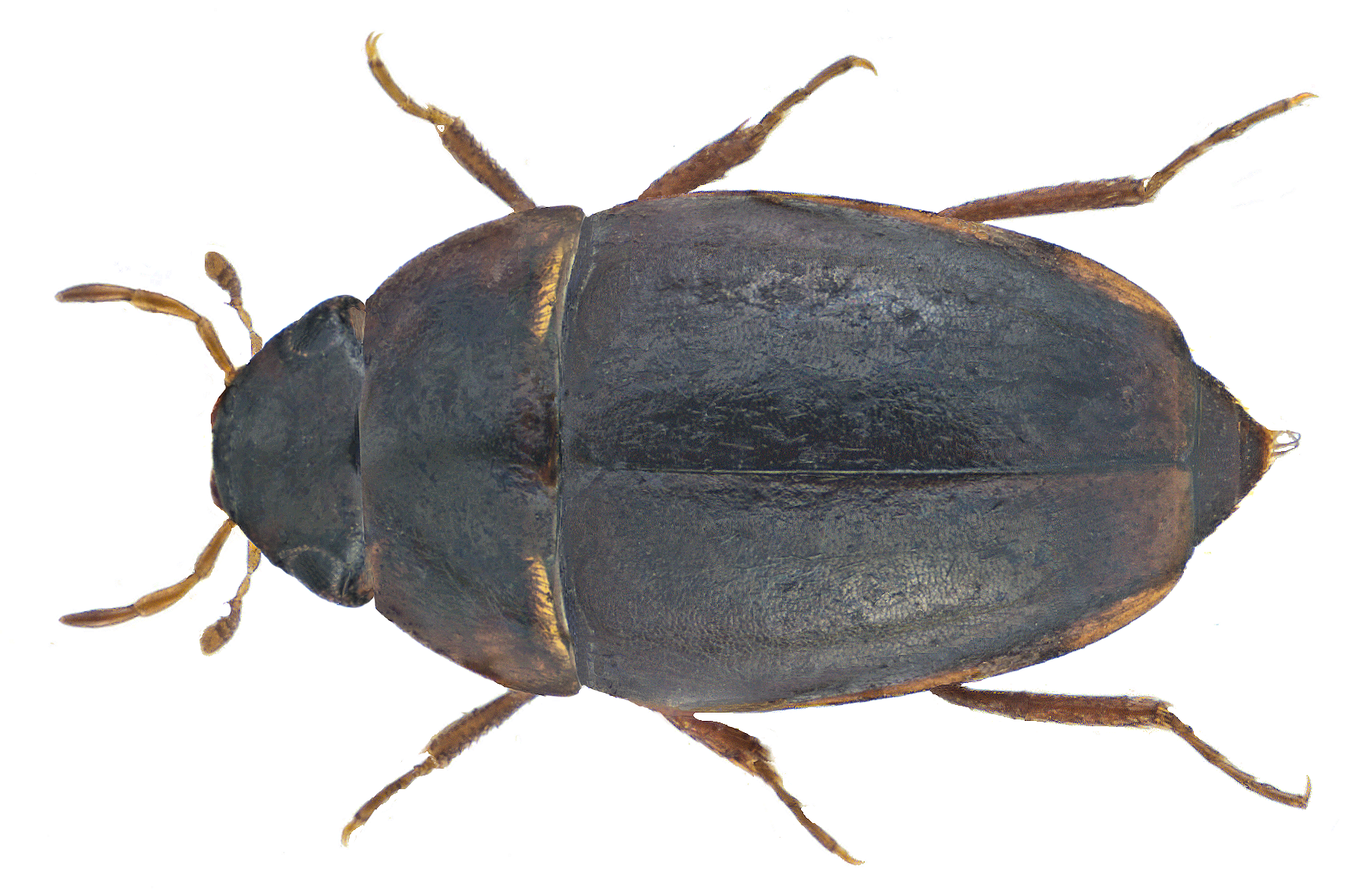
- Limnebius crinifer

Scientific classification
- Domain: Eukaryota
- Kingdom: Animalia
- Phylum: Arthropoda
- Class: Insecta
- Order: Coleoptera
- Suborder: Polyphaga
- Infraorder: Staphyliniformia
- Family: Hydraenidae
- Genus: Limnebius; Leach, 1815

Diversity
- at least 150 species

Synonyms
- Limnocharis Horn, 1872

= Limnebius =

Genus of beetles

Limnebius is a genus of minute moss beetles in the family Hydraenidae. There are more than 160 described species in Limnebius.

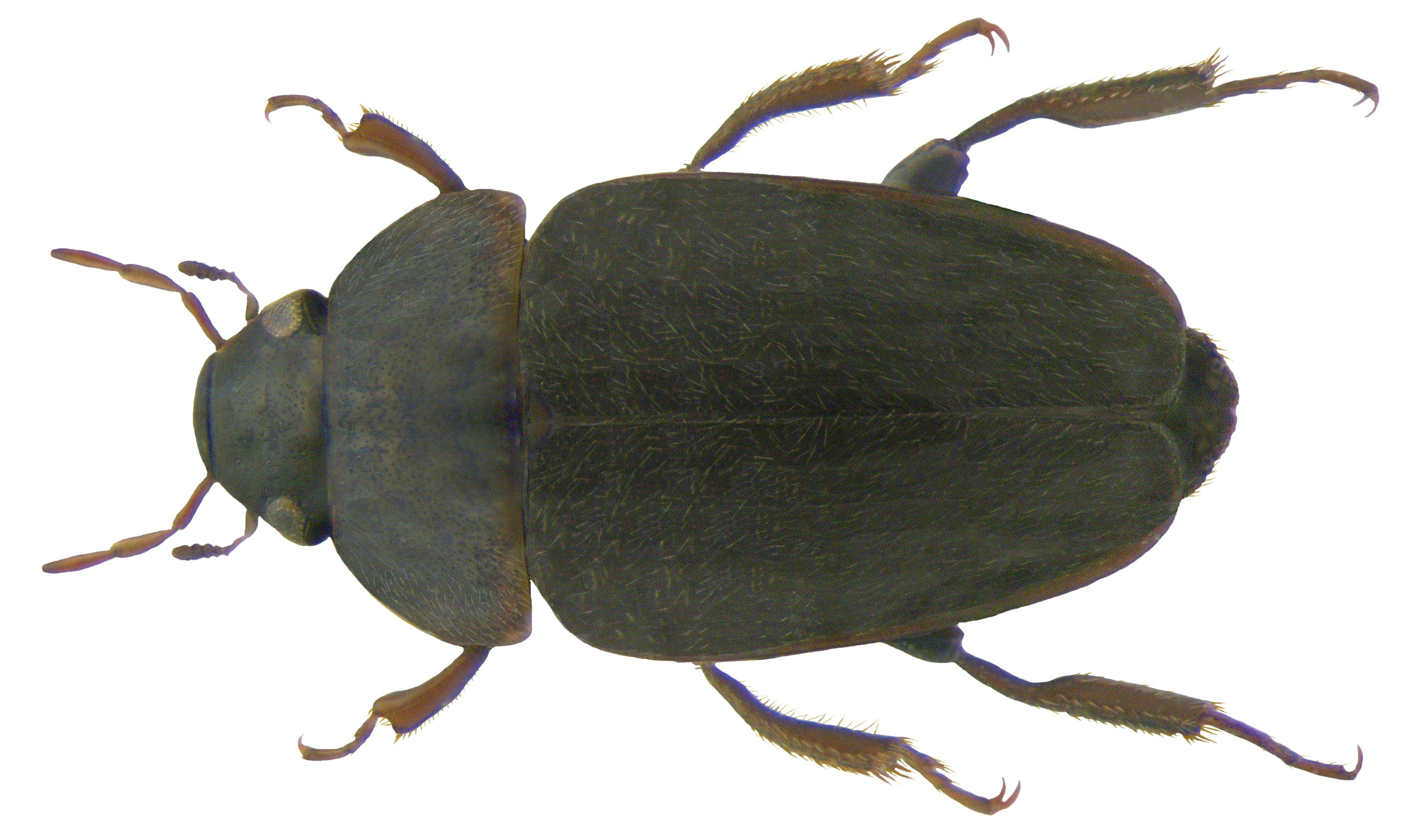
Limnebius truncatellus

== See also ==
- List of Limnebius species
