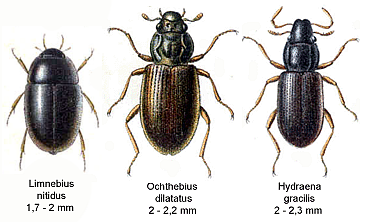

Scientific classification
- Kingdom: Animalia
- Phylum: Arthropoda
- Clade: Pancrustacea
- Class: Insecta
- Order: Coleoptera
- Suborder: Polyphaga
- Infraorder: Staphyliniformia
- Superfamily: Staphylinoidea
- Family: Hydraenidae; Mulsant, 1844

Subfamilies
- Hydraeninae Mulsant, 1844; Ochthebiinae C. G. Thomson, 1860; Orchymontiinae Perkins, 1997; Prosthetopinae Perkins, 1994

= Hydraenidae =

Hydraenidae Temporal range: Early Jurassic–Recent

Family of beetles

Hydraenidae is a family of very small aquatic beetles, sometimes called "Minute moss beetles", with a worldwide distribution. They are around 0.8 to 3.3 mm in length. The adults store air on the underside of the body as well as beneath the elytra which allows them to crawl underwater, often on the underside of the water surface tension, though they cannot swim. Some species have gills that effectively allow them to stay underwater indefinitely. Larvae vary from being fully terrestrial, to being aquatic at least in their earliest instars. The diet of hydraenid larvae and adults is thought to consist of algae, spores and other plant matter. At least some hydraenid adults use stridulation to communicate. There are around 1,300 species in 42 genera.

== Genera ==
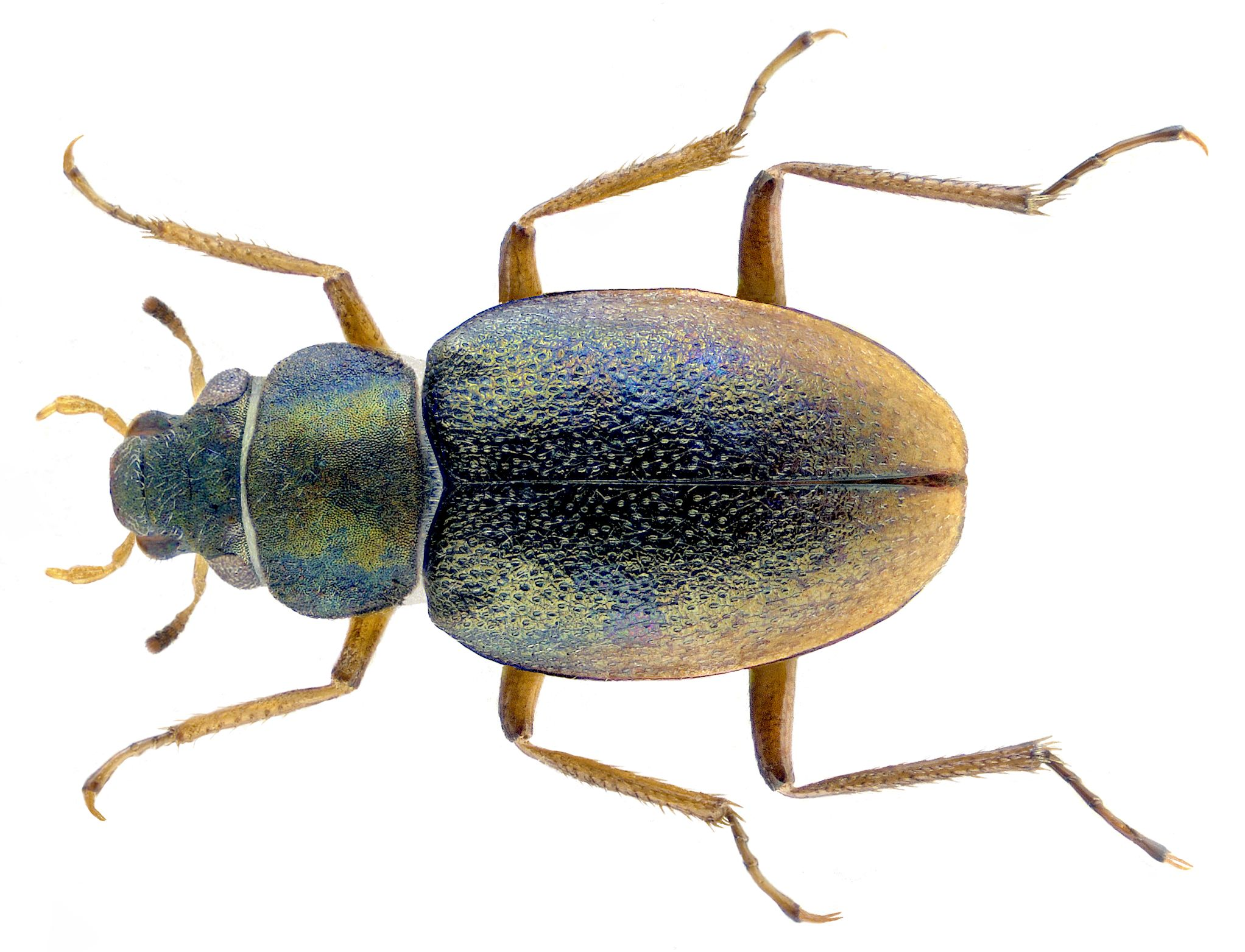
Ochthebius capicola

These 56 genera belong to the family Hydraenidae:

- Adelphydraena Perkins, 1989
- Archaeodraena Jäch & Yamamoto, 2017
- Aulacochthebius Kuwert, 1887
- Calobius Wollaston, 1854
- Cobalius Rey, 1886
- Coelometopon Janssens, 1972
- Davidraena Jäch, 1994
- Decarthrocerus Orchymont, 1948
- Discozantaena Perkins & Balfour-Browne, 1994
- Edaphobates Jäch & Díaz, 2003-01
- Enicocerus Stephens, 1829
- Ginkgoscia Jäch & Díaz, 2004-01
- Gondraena Jäch, 1994
- Gymnanthelius Perkins, 1997
- Gymnochthebius Orchymont, 1943
- Haptaenida Perkins, 1997
- Heptaenida Perkins, 1997
- Homalaena Ordish, 1984
- Hughleechia Perkins, 1981
- Hydraena Kugelann, 1794
- Hydraenida Germain, 1901
- Hydroenida Germain, 1901
- Hymenodes Mulsant, 1844
- Laeliaena Sahlberg, 1900
- Limnebius Leach, 1815
- Madagaster Perkins, 1997
- Menomadraena Perkins, 2017
- Meropathus Enderlein, 1901
- Micragasma Sahlberg, 1900
- Neochthebius Orchymont, 1932
- Nucleotops Perkins & Balfour-Browne, 1994
- Ochtebiites Ponomarenko, 1977
- Ochthebius Leach, 1815
- Ochtheosus Perkins, 1997
- Oomtelecopon Perkins, 2005
- Orchymontia Broun, 1919
- Parasthetops Perkins & Balfour-Browne, 1994-31
- Parhydraena Orchymont, 1937
- Parhydraenopsis Perkins, 2009-16
- Phothydraena Kuwert, 1888
- Pneuminion Perkins, 1997
- Podaena Ordish, 1984
- Prionochthebius Kuwert, 1887
- Prosthetops Waterhouse, 1879
- Protochthebius Perkins, 1997
- Protosthetops Perkins, 1994
- Protozantaena Perkins, 1997
- Pterosthetops Perkins, 1994
- Sebasthetops Jäch, 1998-01
- Sicilicula Balfour-Browne, 1958
- Spanglerina Perkins, 1980
- Trinomadraena Perkins, 2017
- Tympallopatrum Perkins, 1997
- Mesoceration Janssens, 1967
- Parhydraenida Balfour-Browne, 1975
- Tympanogaster Janssens, 1967

=== Extinct genera ===
- †Archaeodraena Jäch and Yamamoto 2017, Burmese amber, Myanmar, Late Cretaceous (Cenomanian)
- †Ochtebiites Ponomarenko 1977 Abasheva Formation, Russia, Early Jurassic (Pliensbachian), Ichetuy Formation, Russia, Karabastau Formation, Kazakhstan, Late Jurassic (Oxfordian), Mogotuin Formation, Mongolia, Early Cretaceous (Aptian)
