= List of Ptinus species =

These 107 species are members of Ptinus, a genus of spider beetles in the family Ptinidae.

== Ptinus species ==
- Ptinus affinis Desbrochers des Loges, 1871^{g}
- Ptinus agnatus Fall, 1905^{i c g}
- Ptinus alternatus Fall, 1905^{i c g}
- Ptinus antennatus Pic, 1896^{g}
- Ptinus argolisanus (Reitter, 1884)^{g}
- Ptinus arragonicus (Brenske & Reitter, 1884)^{g}
- Ptinus atricapillus Kiesenwetter, 1877^{g}
- Ptinus aubei Boieldieu, 1854^{g}
- Ptinus auberti Abeille de Perrin, 1869^{g}
- Ptinus barberi Fisher, 1919^{i c g}
- Ptinus barrosi Pic, 1905^{g}
- Ptinus bertranpetiti
- Ptinus bicinctus Sturm, 1837^{i c g}
- Ptinus bidens Olivier, 1790^{g}
- Ptinus biformis Reitter, 1880^{g}
- Ptinus bimaculatus Melsheimer, 1845^{i c g b}
- Ptinus brevivittis Reitter, 1881^{g}
- Ptinus caelebs Fall, 1905^{i c g b}
- Ptinus calcaratus Kiesenwetter, 1877^{g}
- Ptinus calcarifer (Reitter, 1888)^{g}
- Ptinus californicus Pic, 1900^{i c g b}
- Ptinus capellae Reitter, 1880^{g}
- Ptinus catalonicus Bellés, 2002^{g}
- Ptinus clavipes Panzer, 1792^{i c g}
- Ptinus coarcticollis Sturm, 1837^{g}
- Ptinus cognatus Fall, 1905^{i c g}
- Ptinus concurrens Fall, 1905^{i c g b}
- Ptinus constrictus Blatchley, 1922^{i c g}
- Ptinus corsicus Kiesenwetter, 1877^{g}
- Ptinus crassicornis Kiesenwetter, 1877^{g}
- Ptinus cumaniensis Pic, 1896^{g}
- Ptinus dubius Sturm, 1837^{g}
- Ptinus dufaui Pic, 1906^{g}
- Ptinus ellipticus (Reitter, 1894)^{g}
- Ptinus eximius Fall, 1905^{i c g}
- Ptinus explanatus Fauvel, 1891^{g}
- Ptinus exulans Erichson, 1842^{g}
- Ptinus fallax Fall, 1905^{i c g b}
- Ptinus falli Pic, 1904^{i c g b}
- Ptinus feminalis Fall, 1905^{i c g}
- Ptinus femoralis (Reitter, 1884)^{g}
- Ptinus fur (Linnaeus, 1758)^{i c g b} (whitemarked spider beetle)
- Ptinus gandolphei Pic, 1904^{i c g b}
- Ptinus gylippus Reitter, 1906^{g}
- Ptinus hirticornis Kiesenwetter, 1867^{g}
- Ptinus hispaniolaensis
- Ptinus hystrix Fall, 1905^{i c g b}
- Ptinus insularis Boheman, 1858^{g}
- Ptinus interruptus LeConte, 1857^{i c g b}
- Ptinus italicus Aragona, 1830^{g}
- Ptinus ivanensis (Reitter, 1902)^{g}
- Ptinus japonicus
- Ptinus kiesenwetteri (Reitter, 1884)^{g}
- Ptinus kruperi Pic, 1929^{g}
- Ptinus kutzschenbachi Reitter, 1878^{g}
- Ptinus latro Fabricius, 1775^{i c g b} (brown spider beetle)
- Ptinus leprieuri Pic, 1896^{g}
- Ptinus lichenum Marsham, 1802^{g}
- Ptinus longivestis Fall, 1905^{i c g}
- Ptinus maculosus Abeille de Perrin, 1895^{g}
- Ptinus madoni Pic, 1932^{g}
- Ptinus mediterraneus
- Ptinus mitchelli Fisher, 1919^{i c g}
- Ptinus nigripennis Comolli, 1837^{g}
- Ptinus nikitanus (Brenske & Reitter, 1884)^{g}
- Ptinus obesus P.H.Lucas, 1846^{g}
- Ptinus oertzeni (Reitter, 1888)^{g}
- Ptinus palliatus (Perris, 1847)^{g}
- Ptinus paulonotatus Pic, 1904^{i c g b}
- Ptinus pellitus Desbrochers des Loges, 1875^{g}
- Ptinus perplexus Mulsant & Rey, 1868^{g}
- Ptinus perrini (Reitter, 1884)^{g}
- Ptinus phlomidis Boieldieu, 1854^{g}
- Ptinus pilosus Müller, 1821^{g}
- Ptinus podolicus Iablokoff-Khnzorian & Karapetian, 1991^{g}
- Ptinus prolixus Fall, 1905^{i c g}
- Ptinus pusillus Sturm, 1837^{g}
- Ptinus pyrenaeus Pic, 1897^{g}
- Ptinus quadrimaculatus Melsheimer, 1846^{i c g}
- Ptinus raptor Sturm, 1837^{i c g b} (eastern spider beetle)
- Ptinus reitteri Pic, 1894^{g}
- Ptinus rufipes Olivier, 1790^{g}
- Ptinus rufolimbatus Pic, 1908^{g}
- Ptinus rufus Brulle, 1832^{g}
- Ptinus rugosicollis (Desbrochers des Loges, 1875)^{g}
- Ptinus salvatori Pic, 1901^{g}
- Ptinus schatzmayeri Pic, 1934^{g}
- Ptinus schlerethi (Reitter, 1884)^{g}
- Ptinus sexpunctatus Panzer, 1795^{g b}
- Ptinus spissicornis Abeille de Perrin, 1894^{g}
- Ptinus spitzyi A.Villa & G.B.Villa, 1838^{g}
- Ptinus strangulatus Fall, 1905^{i c g b}
- Ptinus subaeneus (Reitter, 1884)^{g}
- Ptinus subpillosus Sturm, 1837^{g}
- Ptinus subroseus Reitter, 1888^{g}
- Ptinus tarsalis (Reitter, 1884)^{g}
- Ptinus tauricus (Brenske & Reitter, 1884)^{g}
- Ptinus tectus Boieldieu, 1856^{i c g b} (Australian spider beetle)
- Ptinus texanus Pic, 1903^{i c g b}
- Ptinus timidus Brisout de Barneville, 1866^{g}
- Ptinus torretassoi Pic, 1934^{g}
- Ptinus tuberculatus Blatchley, 1920^{i c g}
- Ptinus tumidus Fall, 1905^{i c g b}
- Ptinus variegatus Rossi, 1794^{i c g}
- Ptinus vegrandis Fall, 1905^{i c g}
- Ptinus verticalis LeConte, 1859^{i c g b}
- Ptinus villiger (Reitter, 1884)^{i c g b} (hairy spider beetle)

Data sources: i = ITIS, c = Catalogue of Life, g = GBIF, b = Bugguide.net
