= Ptinus clavipes =

Scientific classification
- Kingdom: Animalia
- Phylum: Arthropoda
- Class: Insecta
- Order: Coleoptera
- Suborder: Polyphaga
- Family: Ptinidae
- Genus: Ptinus
- Species: P. clavipes

Binomial name
- Ptinus clavipes Panzer, 1792

Species of beetle

Ptinus clavipes is a species of spider beetle in the family Ptinidae.
