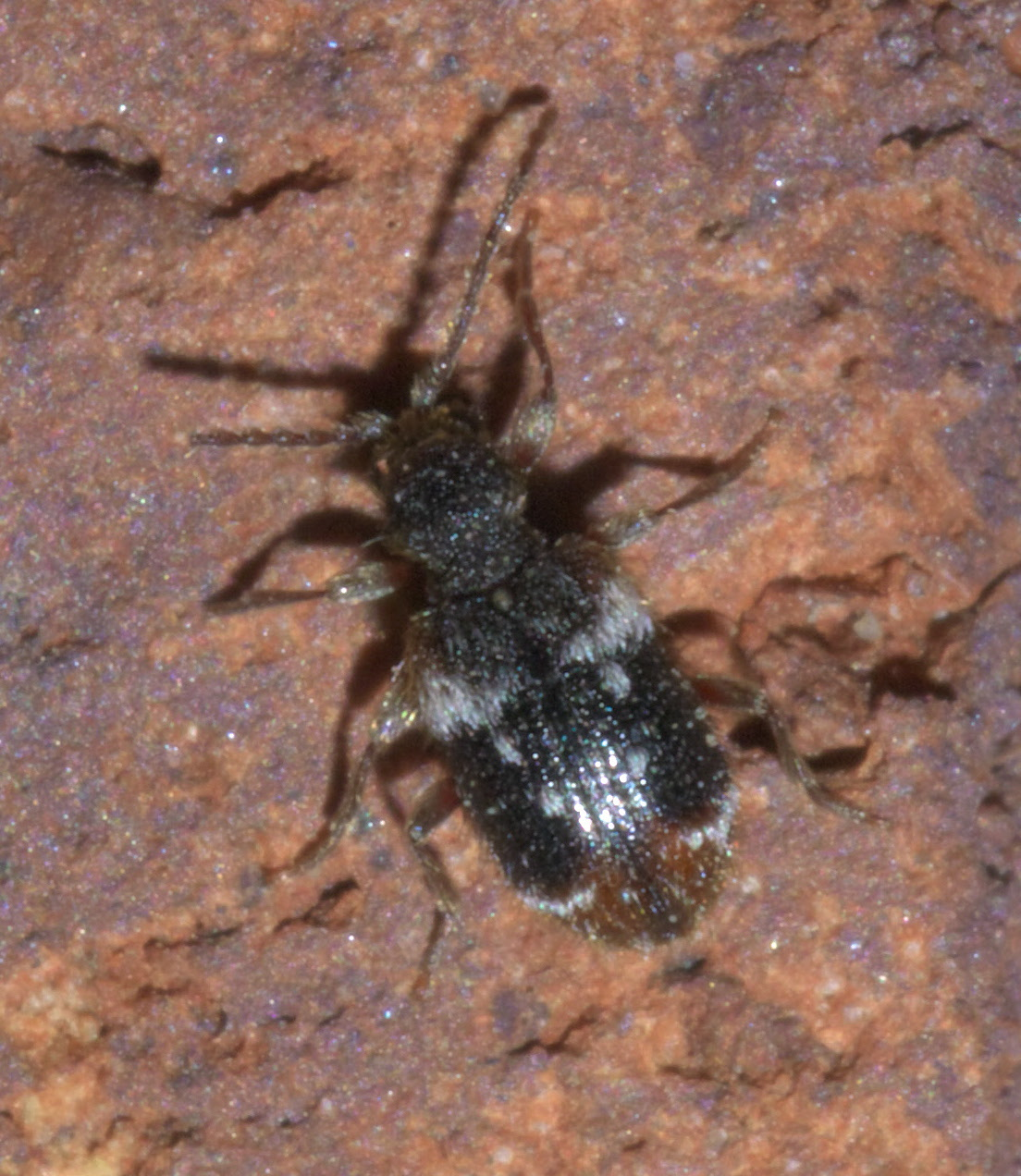

Scientific classification
- Kingdom: Animalia
- Phylum: Arthropoda
- Class: Insecta
- Order: Coleoptera
- Suborder: Polyphaga
- Family: Ptinidae
- Subfamily: Ptininae
- Genus: Ptinus
- Species: P. bimaculatus

Binomial name
- Ptinus bimaculatus Melsheimer, 1845

= Ptinus bimaculatus =

Species of beetle

Ptinus bimaculatus is a species of spider beetle in the family Ptinidae. It is found in North America.

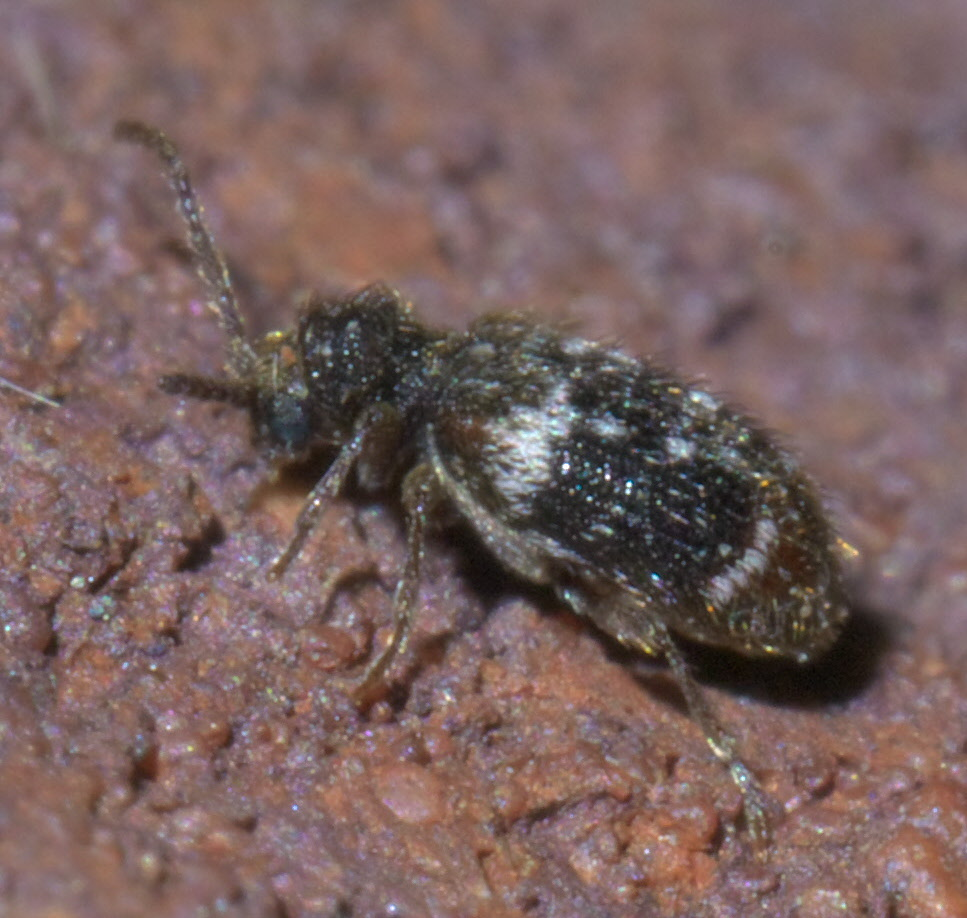
