= Ptinus verticalis =

Scientific classification
- Kingdom: Animalia
- Phylum: Arthropoda
- Class: Insecta
- Order: Coleoptera
- Suborder: Polyphaga
- Family: Ptinidae
- Genus: Ptinus
- Species: P. verticalis

Binomial name
- Ptinus verticalis LeConte, 1859

Species of beetle

Ptinus verticalis is a species of spider beetle in the family Ptinidae. It is found in North America.
