= Ptinus falli =

Scientific classification
- Kingdom: Animalia
- Phylum: Arthropoda
- Class: Insecta
- Order: Coleoptera
- Suborder: Polyphaga
- Family: Ptinidae
- Subfamily: Ptininae
- Genus: Ptinus
- Species: P. falli

Binomial name
- Ptinus falli Pic, 1904

Species of beetle

Ptinus falli is a species of spider beetle in the family Ptinidae. It is found in North America.
