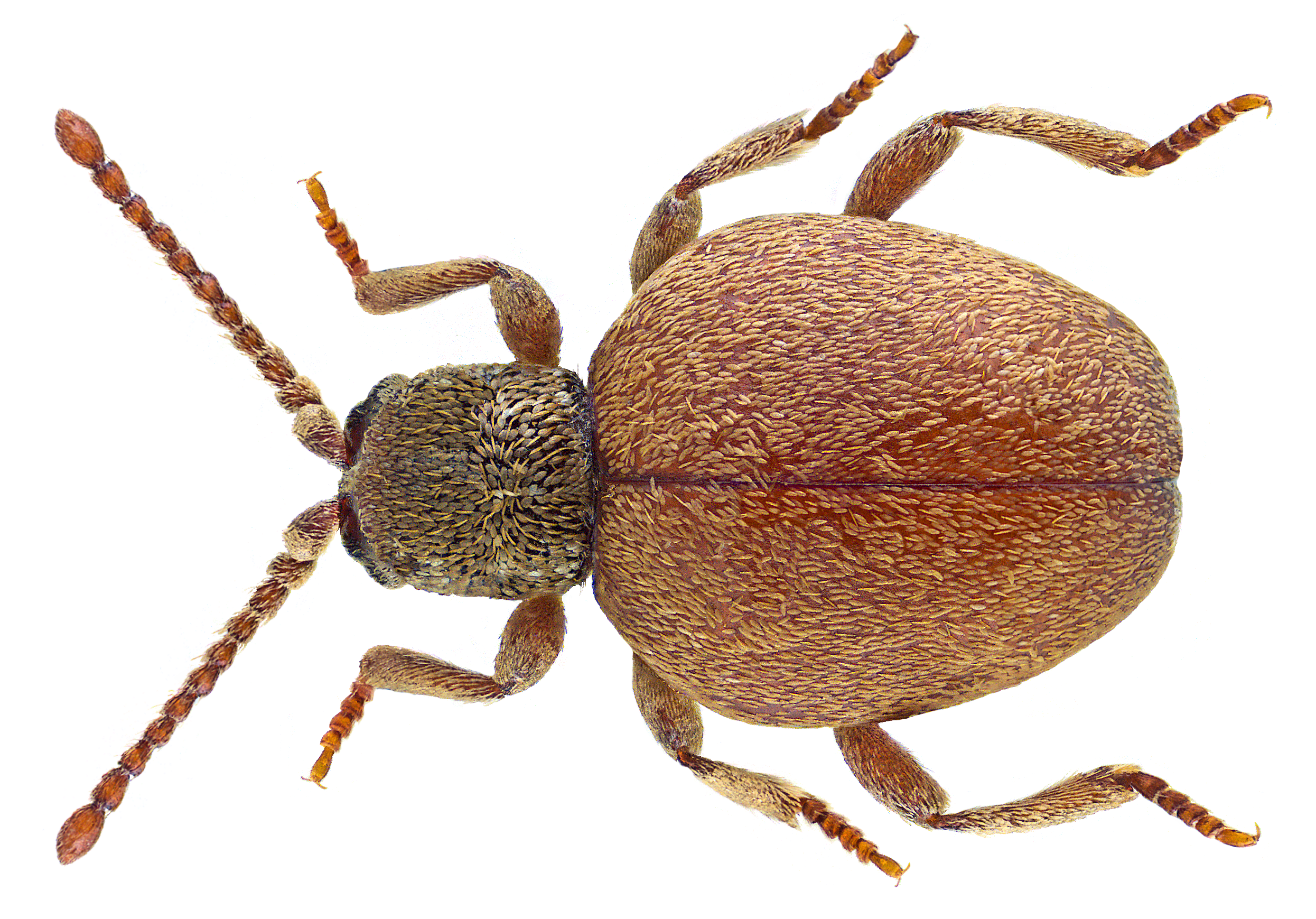

Scientific classification
- Kingdom: Animalia
- Phylum: Arthropoda
- Clade: Pancrustacea
- Class: Insecta
- Order: Coleoptera
- Suborder: Polyphaga
- Family: Ptinidae
- Tribe: Sphaericini
- Genus: Sphaericus
- Species: S. gibboides

Binomial name
- Sphaericus gibboides Boieldieu, 1854

= Sphaericus gibboides =

Species of beetle

Sphaericus gibboides, the humped spider beetle, is a species of spider beetle in the family Ptinidae. It is found in Africa, Australia, Europe and Northern Asia (excluding China), and North America.
