= Ptinus interruptus =

Scientific classification
- Kingdom: Animalia
- Phylum: Arthropoda
- Class: Insecta
- Order: Coleoptera
- Suborder: Polyphaga
- Family: Ptinidae
- Genus: Ptinus
- Species: P. interruptus

Binomial name
- Ptinus interruptus LeConte, 1857

Species of beetle

Ptinus interruptus is a species of spider beetle in the family Ptinidae. It is found in North America.
