= Eupauloecus =

Scientific classification
- Kingdom: Animalia
- Phylum: Arthropoda
- Class: Insecta
- Order: Coleoptera
- Suborder: Polyphaga
- Family: Ptinidae
- Subfamily: Ptininae
- Genus: Eupauloecus; Mulsant and Rey, 1868

Genus of beetles

Eupauloecus is a genus of spider beetles found in western North America. They consume conifers.

== Selected species ==
- Eupauloecus unicolor (Piller & Mitterpacher, 1783)
