= Ptinus raptor =

Scientific classification
- Kingdom: Animalia
- Phylum: Arthropoda
- Class: Insecta
- Order: Coleoptera
- Suborder: Polyphaga
- Family: Ptinidae
- Genus: Ptinus
- Species: P. raptor

Binomial name
- Ptinus raptor Sturm, 1837

Species of beetle

Ptinus raptor, the eastern spider beetle, is a species of spider beetle in the family Ptinidae.
