= Ptinus pusillus =

Scientific classification
- Kingdom: Animalia
- Phylum: Arthropoda
- Class: Insecta
- Order: Coleoptera
- Suborder: Polyphaga
- Family: Ptinidae
- Genus: Ptinus
- Species: P. pusillus

Binomial name
- Ptinus pusillus Sturm, 1837

Species of beetle

Ptinus pusillus is a species of spider beetle in the family Ptinidae.
