= Ptinus palliatus =

Scientific classification
- Kingdom: Animalia
- Phylum: Arthropoda
- Class: Insecta
- Order: Coleoptera
- Suborder: Polyphaga
- Family: Ptinidae
- Genus: Ptinus
- Species: P. palliatus

Binomial name
- Ptinus palliatus (Perris, 1847)

Species of beetle

Ptinus palliatus is a species of spider beetle in the family Ptinidae.
