= Ptinus subpilosus =

Scientific classification
- Kingdom: Animalia
- Phylum: Arthropoda
- Class: Insecta
- Order: Coleoptera
- Suborder: Polyphaga
- Family: Ptinidae
- Genus: Ptinus
- Species: P. subpilosus

Binomial name
- Ptinus subpilosus Sturm, 1837

Species of beetle

Ptinus subpilosus is a species of beetles in the genus Ptinus of the family Ptinidae.
