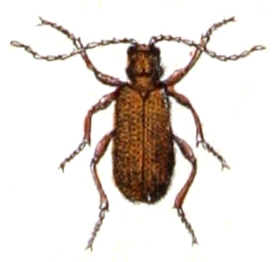

Scientific classification
- Kingdom: Animalia
- Phylum: Arthropoda
- Class: Insecta
- Order: Coleoptera
- Suborder: Polyphaga
- Family: Ptinidae
- Genus: Ptinus
- Species: P. latro

Binomial name
- Ptinus latro Fabricius, 1775

= Ptinus latro =

Species of beetle

Ptinus latro, the brown spider beetle, is a species of spider beetle in the family Ptinidae. It is found in Africa, Europe and Northern Asia (excluding China), North America, and Southern Asia.
