= Ptinus tumidus =

Scientific classification
- Kingdom: Animalia
- Phylum: Arthropoda
- Class: Insecta
- Order: Coleoptera
- Suborder: Polyphaga
- Family: Ptinidae
- Genus: Ptinus
- Species: P. tumidus

Binomial name
- Ptinus tumidus Fall, 1905

Species of beetle

Ptinus tumidus is a species of spider beetle in the family Ptinidae. It is found in North America.
