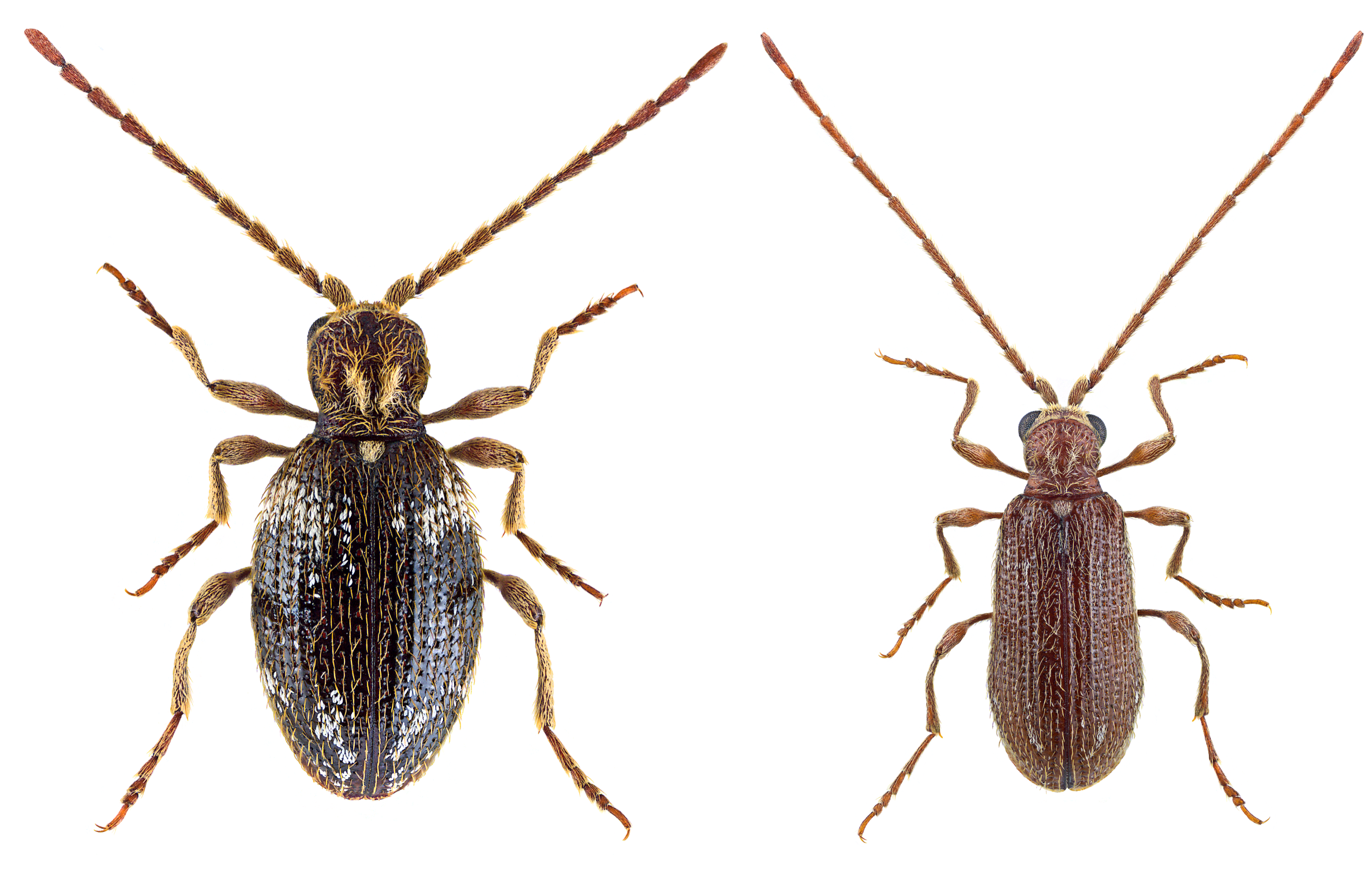

Scientific classification
- Kingdom: Animalia
- Phylum: Arthropoda
- Class: Insecta
- Order: Coleoptera
- Suborder: Polyphaga
- Superfamily: Bostrichoidea
- Family: Ptinidae
- Subfamily: Ptininae
- Genus: Ptinus
- Species: P. fur

Binomial name
- Ptinus fur (Linnaeus, 1758)

Synonyms
- Cerambyx fur Linnaeus, 1758; Buprestis fur Scopoli, 1763

= Ptinus fur =

Species of beetle

Ptinus fur, the white marked spider beetle, is a species of spider beetle in the genus Ptinus (family Ptinidae), with a nearly cosmopolitan distribution.

== Description ==
Adults are morphologically similar to other spider beetle species, notably the hairy spider beetle (Ptinus villiger). It is red-brown with yellow hairs, and measures 2.0–4.3 millimetres (0.08–0.17 in) in length. The prothorax is densely covered with pale hairs, while the elytra bear some patches of white scales.

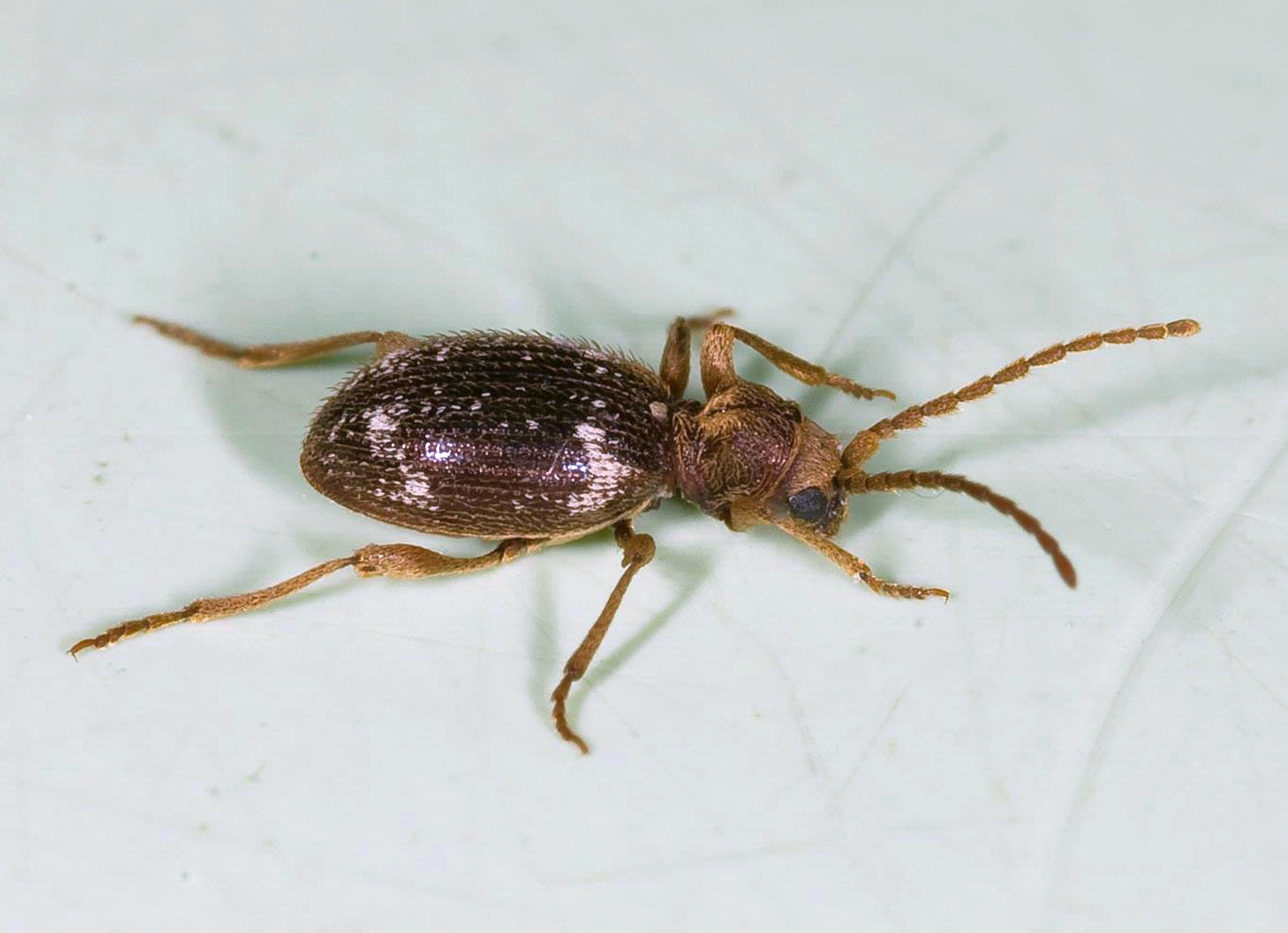
Ptinus fur female, dorsolateral view

== Distribution and habitat ==
It is a pest of stored foods, with a worldwide distribution, where it may be identified by leaving webbed, granular materials on the stored products. Ptinus fur adults feed on dried and decaying animal and vegetable material. It has also been identified as a pest in museums, damaging stored collections.

It has been found in the nests of birds, notably the sand martin.

== Life cycle ==
Ptinus fur experiences an optimal temperature for development at 23 °C (73 °F), and may complete its life cycle in 132 days on fishmeal or fewer on wheat-based feed at this temperature per Howe and Burges. Larvae of P. fur normally moult three times at 23 °C but some may achieve an extra moult on certain media.

Ptinus fur is capable of undergoing diapause within cocoons in a subset of final-instar larvae: at 23 °C diapause can extend for 220 days after other larvae have pupated, while it reportedly lasts up to 280 days at 20 °C (68 °F).

According to Howe and Burges, adult beetles have a life span of several months and may also diapause in cocoons.
