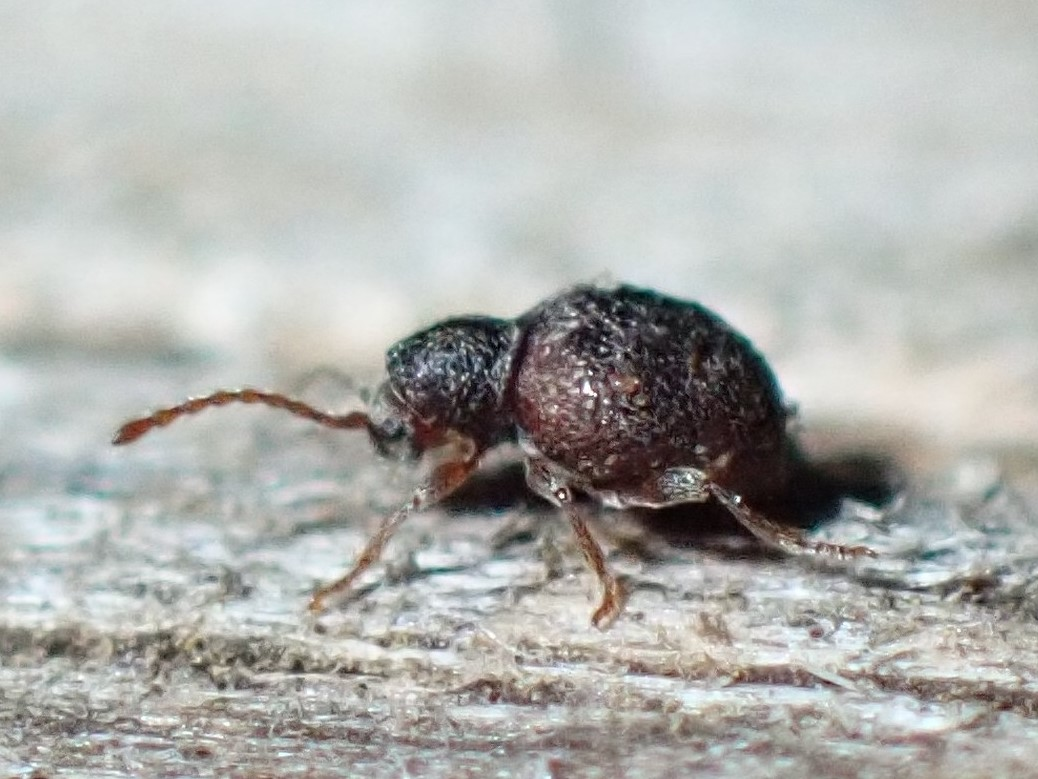

Scientific classification
- Kingdom: Animalia
- Phylum: Arthropoda
- Clade: Pancrustacea
- Class: Insecta
- Order: Coleoptera
- Suborder: Polyphaga
- Family: Ptinidae
- Subfamily: Ptininae
- Tribe: Sphaericini
- Genus: Sphaericus; Wollaston, 1854

= Sphaericus =

Genus of beetles

Sphaericus is a genus of spider beetles in the family Ptinidae. There are more than 30 described species in the genus Sphaericus.

== Species ==
These 36 species belong to the genus Sphaericus:

- Sphaericus albopictus (Wollaston, 1854)
- Sphaericus ambiguus Wollaston, 1865
- Sphaericus ater Leiler, 1984
- Sphaericus bicolor Bélles, 1982
- Sphaericus crotchianus Wollaston, 1864
- Sphaericus dawsoni (Wollaston, 1854)
- Sphaericus erinaceus Erber, 2000
- Sphaericus exiguus (Boieldieu, 1854)
- Sphaericus flavosquamosus Erber, 2000
- Sphaericus fragilis (Wollaston, 1854)
- Sphaericus franzi Leiler, 1984
- Sphaericus gibbicollis Wollaston, 1862
- Sphaericus gibboides Boieldieu, 1854 (humped spider beetle)
- Sphaericus leileri Erber, 2000
- Sphaericus longicornis (Wollaston, 1854)
- Sphaericus machadoi Belles, 1994
- Sphaericus marmoratus Wollaston, 1865
- Sphaericus naviculiformis Erber, 2000
- Sphaericus nigrescens (Wollaston, 1857)
- Sphaericus niveus (Boieldieu, 1854)
- Sphaericus nodulus (Wollaston, 1854)
- Sphaericus obscurus Erber, 2000
- Sphaericus orbatus (Wollaston, 1854)
- Sphaericus orzolensis Leiler, 1984
- Sphaericus pilula (Wollaston, 1854)
- Sphaericus pinguis (Wollaston, 1854)
- Sphaericus ptinoides (Boieldieu, 1854)
- Sphaericus rotundatus Wollaston, 1865
- Sphaericus rotundicollis Israelson, 1980
- Sphaericus saetiger Erber, 2000
- Sphaericus selvagensis Bellés, 2001
- Sphaericus simplex Wollaston, 1862
- Sphaericus thurepalmi Leiler, 1984
- Sphaericus truncatus
- Sphaericus velhocabrali Israelson, 1984
- Sphaericus ventriculus Erber, 2000
