= Gnostus =

Scientific classification
- Kingdom: Animalia
- Phylum: Arthropoda
- Clade: Pancrustacea
- Class: Insecta
- Order: Coleoptera
- Suborder: Polyphaga
- Family: Ptinidae
- Genus: Gnostus; Westwood, 1855
- Species: G. floridanus

Binomial name
- Gnostus floridanus Blatchley, 1930

Genus of beetles

Gnostus is a genus of spider beetles in the family Ptinidae. There is one described species in Gnostus, G. floridanus.
