= Ptinus pilosus =

Scientific classification
- Kingdom: Animalia
- Phylum: Arthropoda
- Class: Insecta
- Order: Coleoptera
- Suborder: Polyphaga
- Family: Ptinidae
- Genus: Ptinus
- Species: P. pilosus

Binomial name
- Ptinus pilosus P.W.J.Müller, 1821

Species of beetle

Ptinus pilosus is a species of beetles in the genus Ptinus of the family Ptinidae. This species was first described in 1821 by Philipp Wilbrand Jacob Müller.
