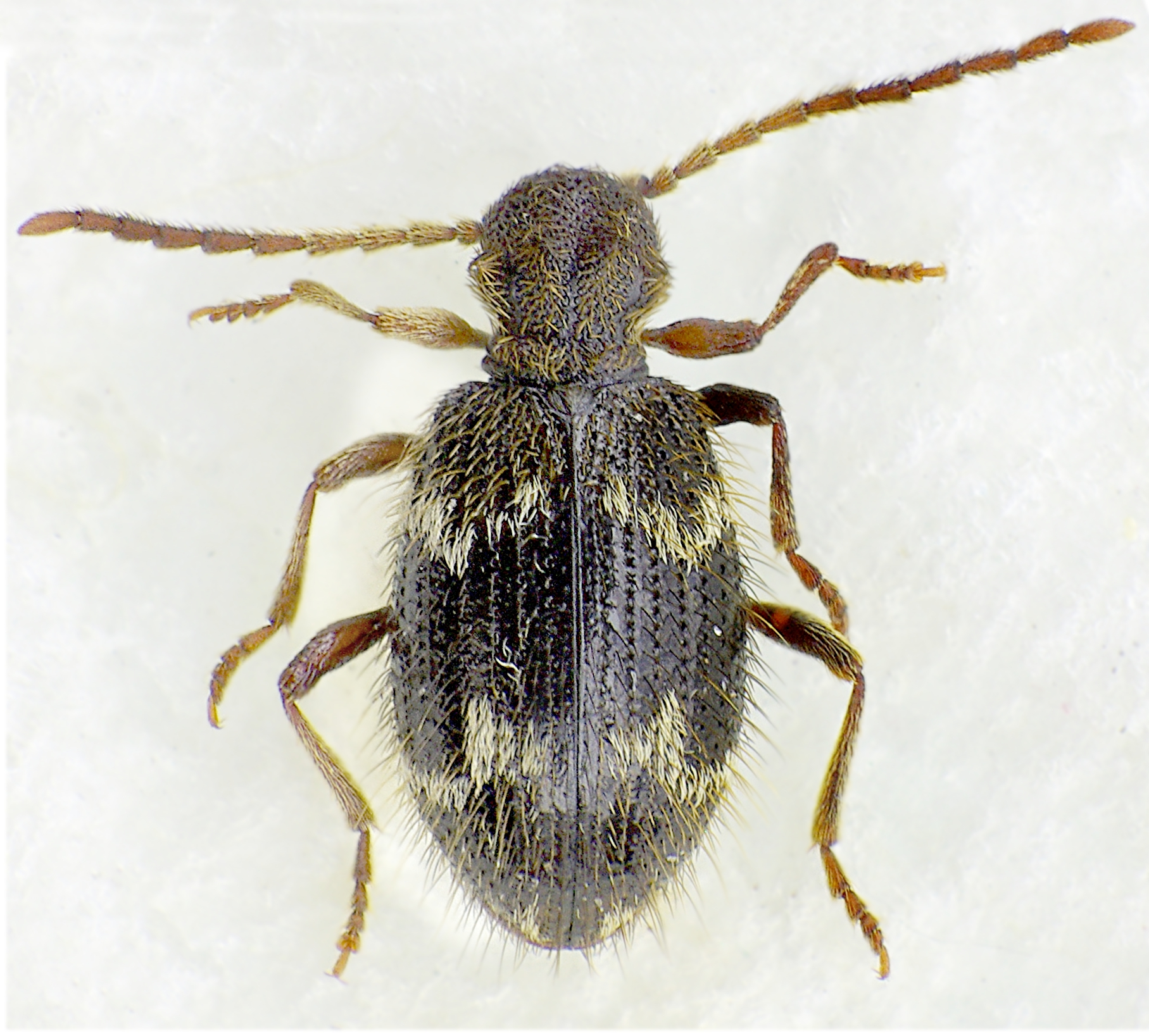
- Female
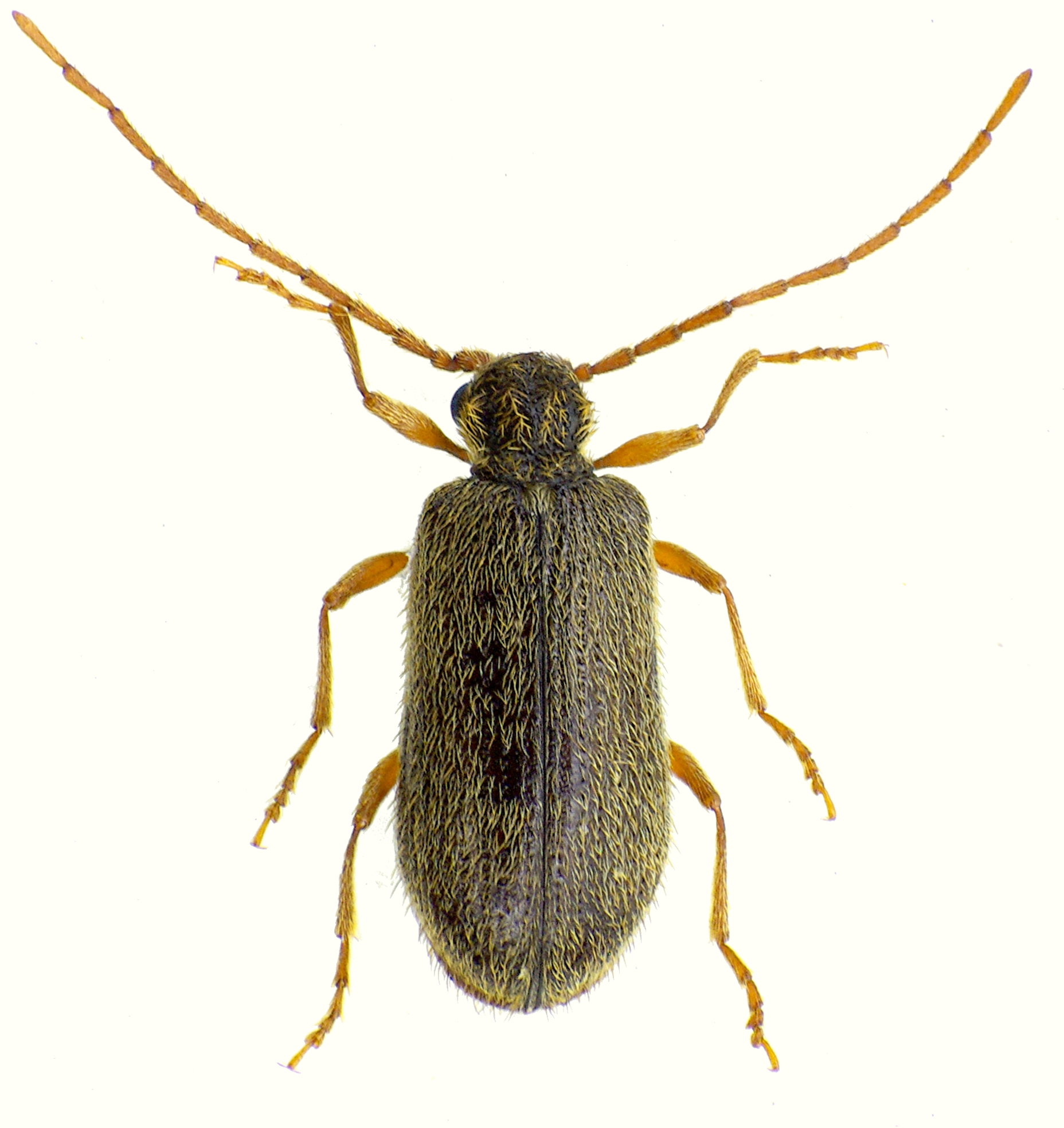
- Male

Scientific classification
- Kingdom: Animalia
- Phylum: Arthropoda
- Class: Insecta
- Order: Coleoptera
- Suborder: Polyphaga
- Family: Ptinidae
- Genus: Ptinus
- Species: P. rufipes

Binomial name
- Ptinus rufipes Olivier, 1790

= Ptinus rufipes =

Species of spider beetle in the family Ptinidae

Ptinus rufipes is a species of beetle in the family Ptinidae (spider beetles). P. rufipes is one of at least eleven species of ptinid in the subgenus Bruchoptinus. The subgenus was first described by Edmund Reitter in 1884.

== Gallery ==
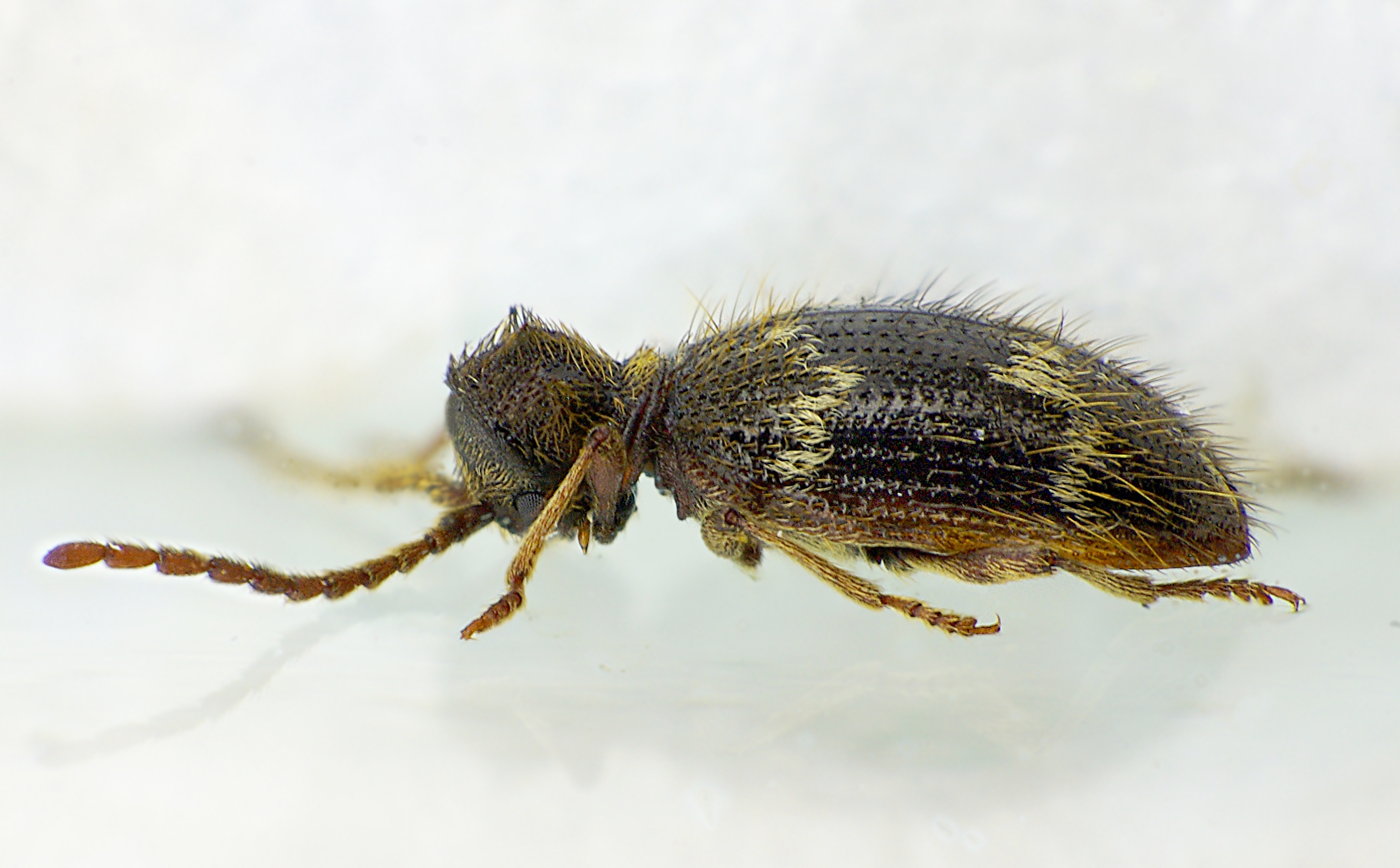
Female, side

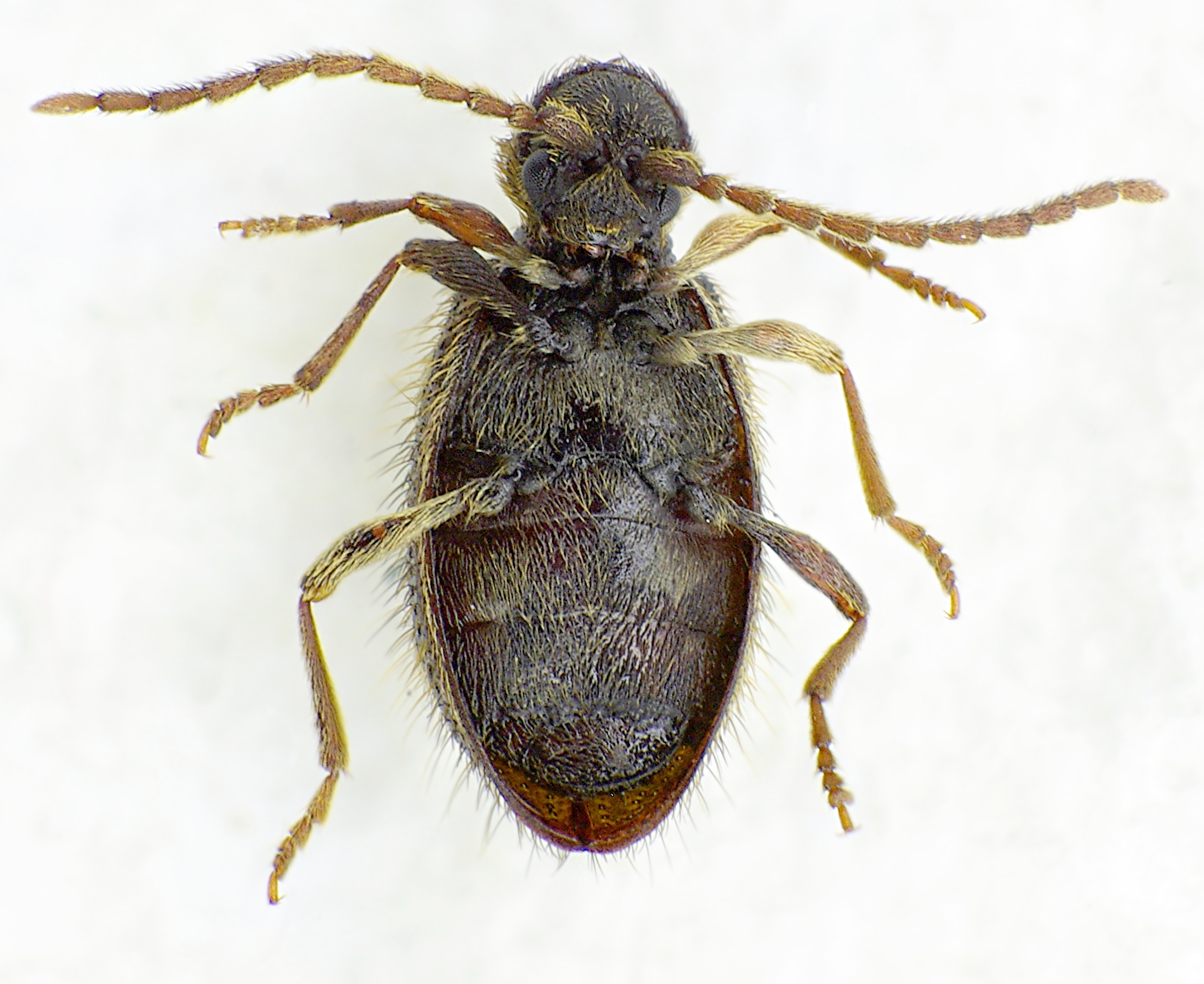
Female, underneath

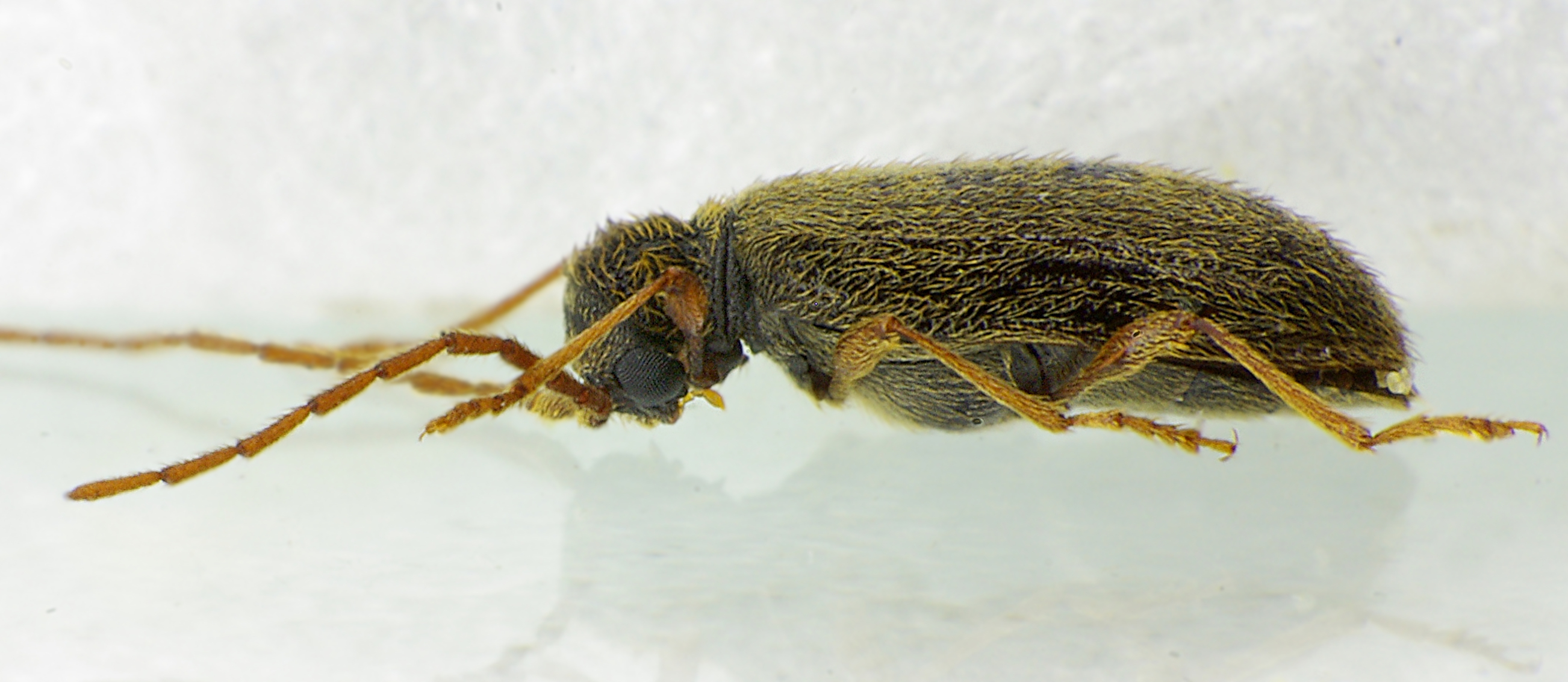
Male, side

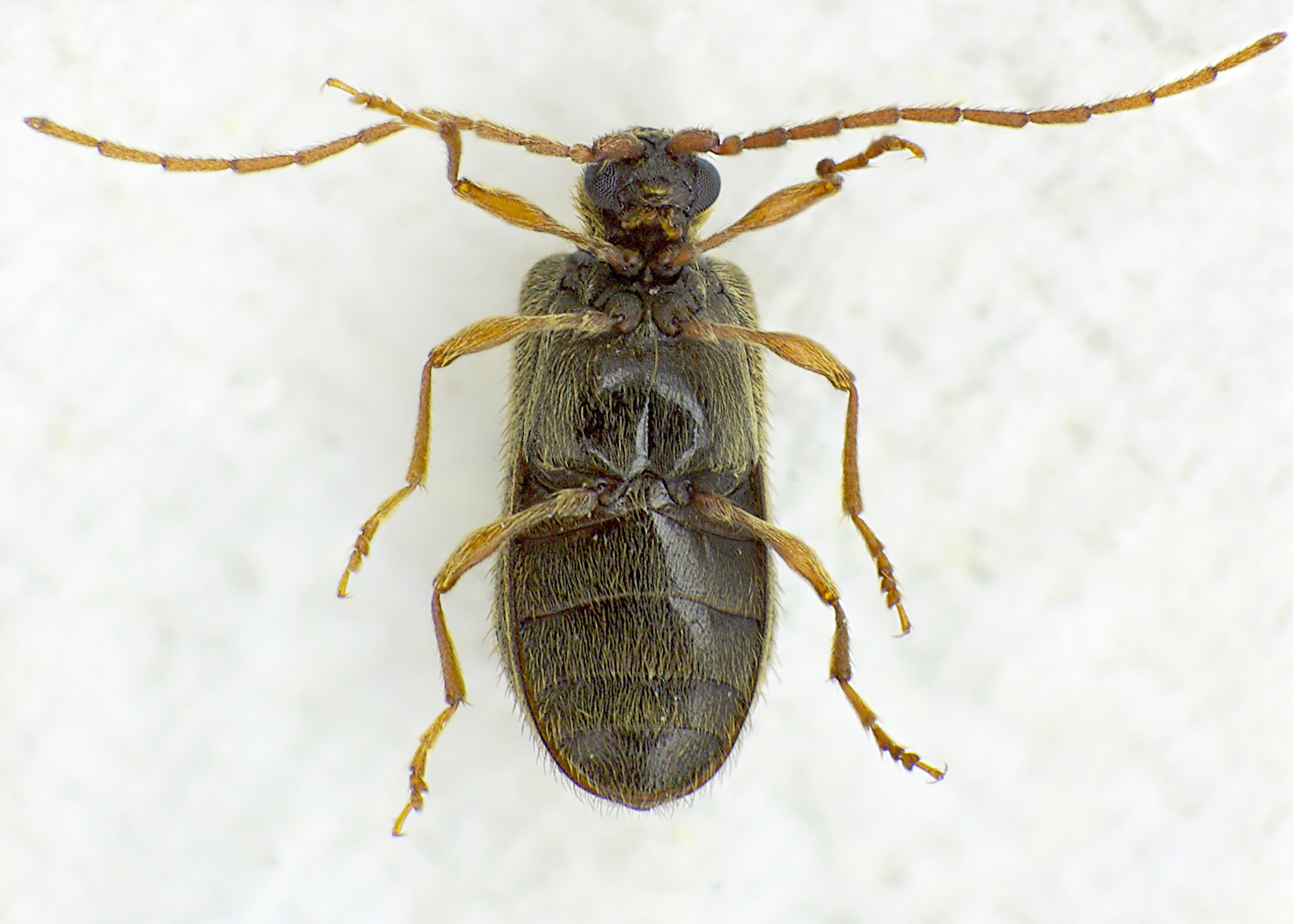
Male, underneath
