= Ptinus lichenum =

Scientific classification
- Kingdom: Animalia
- Phylum: Arthropoda
- Clade: Pancrustacea
- Class: Insecta
- Order: Coleoptera
- Suborder: Polyphaga
- Family: Ptinidae
- Genus: Ptinus
- Species: P. lichenum

Binomial name
- Ptinus lichenum Marsham, 1802

Species of beetle

Ptinus lichenum is a species of beetles in the genus Ptinus of the family Ptinidae.

== Habitat ==
Ptinus lichenum are found in natural habitats in association with dead wood.

== Distribution ==
Ptinus lichenum has a scattered distribution in the United Kingdom where it is designated as 'rare'. The species is recorded in continental Europe in France and Germany.
