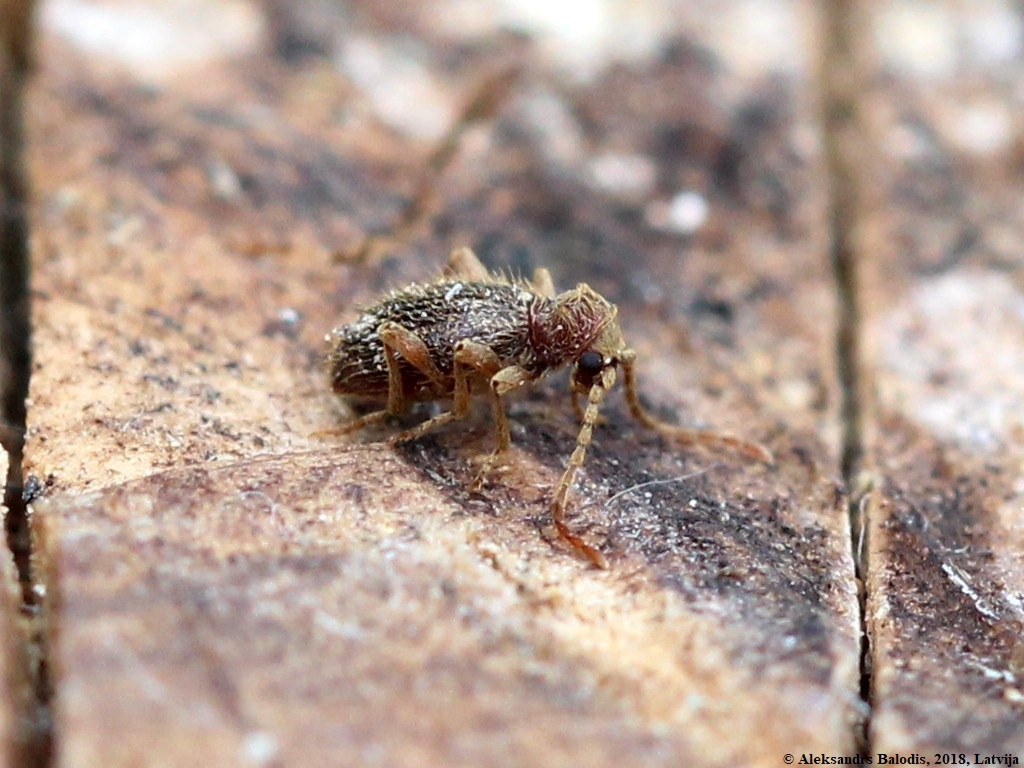

Scientific classification
- Kingdom: Animalia
- Phylum: Arthropoda
- Class: Insecta
- Order: Coleoptera
- Suborder: Polyphaga
- Family: Ptinidae
- Genus: Ptinus
- Species: P. villiger

Binomial name
- Ptinus villiger (Reitter, 1884)

Synonyms
- Bruchus villiger Reitter, 1884

= Ptinus villiger =

Species of beetle

Ptinus villiger is a species of spider beetle in the family Ptinidae.
