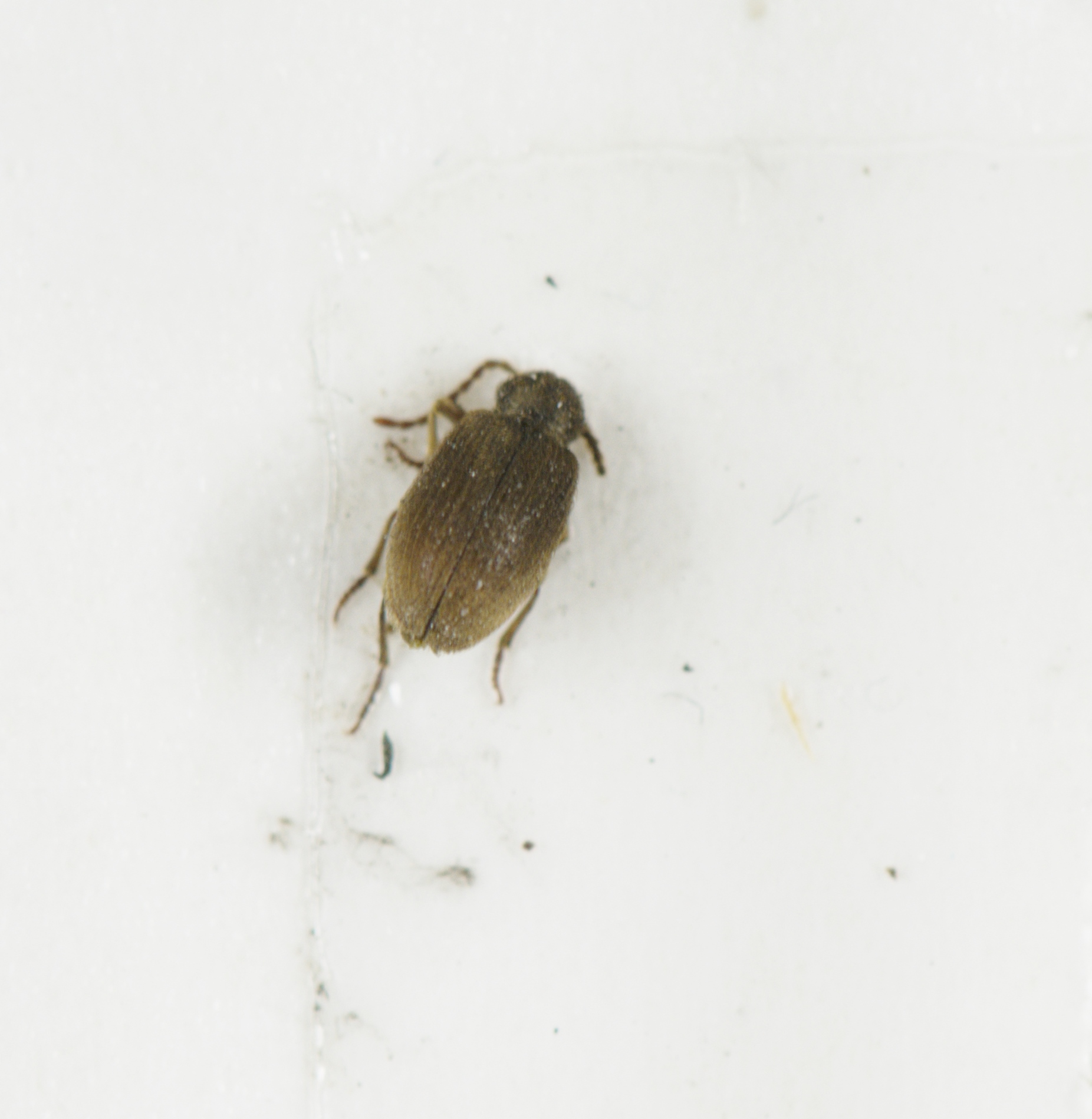

Scientific classification
- Domain: Eukaryota
- Kingdom: Animalia
- Phylum: Arthropoda
- Class: Insecta
- Order: Coleoptera
- Suborder: Polyphaga
- Family: Ptinidae
- Genus: Ptinus
- Species: P. tectus

Binomial name
- Ptinus tectus Boieldieu, 1856

Synonyms
- Ptinus ocellus Brown, 1929

= Ptinus tectus =

Species of beetle

Ptinus tectus, often called the Australian spider beetle, is a species of beetle in the family Ptinidae, or family Anobiidae, subfamily Ptininae. It is a cosmopolitan species (arrived in Europe and the UK from Australia in 1900). It is a pest of stored foods and museum specimens.

P. tectus Boieldieu, 1856 is the name most often used for this species. Some works still state Ptinus ocellus Brown, 1929.

== Biology ==
=== Description ===
The Australian spider beetle (Pictus tectus) measures 2.5–4 mm in length and is coloured dark brown. The adults have biting mouthparts, a well developed thorax and 11-segmented antennae. Characteristics which give them a spider-like appearance include a stout body, pronounced constriction of the neck shield and 6 long thin legs with 5-segmented tarsi.

=== Life cycle ===
The female Australian spider beetle lays 100–120 sticky eggs over a period of 4–5 weeks in early summer, either singly or in small batches. At 20–25 °C the eggs hatch in 3–16 days, producing larvae which are fleshy, curved, covered with fine hairs and relatively immobile. Larval development takes at least 6 weeks, during which time the larvae moult 4 or 5 times. When mature, they wander in search of a pupation site where they spin a cocoon cell in which to pupate. Adults emerge after 20 to 30 days and will live for as long 12 months.

At 70% R.H. development of Ptinus tectus from egg laying to emergence from the cocoon takes an average of about 62 days at 23–25 °C; at 15 °C the time taken is about 130 days. The minimum temperature at which complete development can occur is 10 °C and the maximum is between 28 and 30 °C. Considerable mortality occurs in eggs and larvae at 28 °C.

== Domestic pest ==
The species is considered as a pest in museums. It is recorded from at least 55 museums and historic houses in the United Kingdom.
