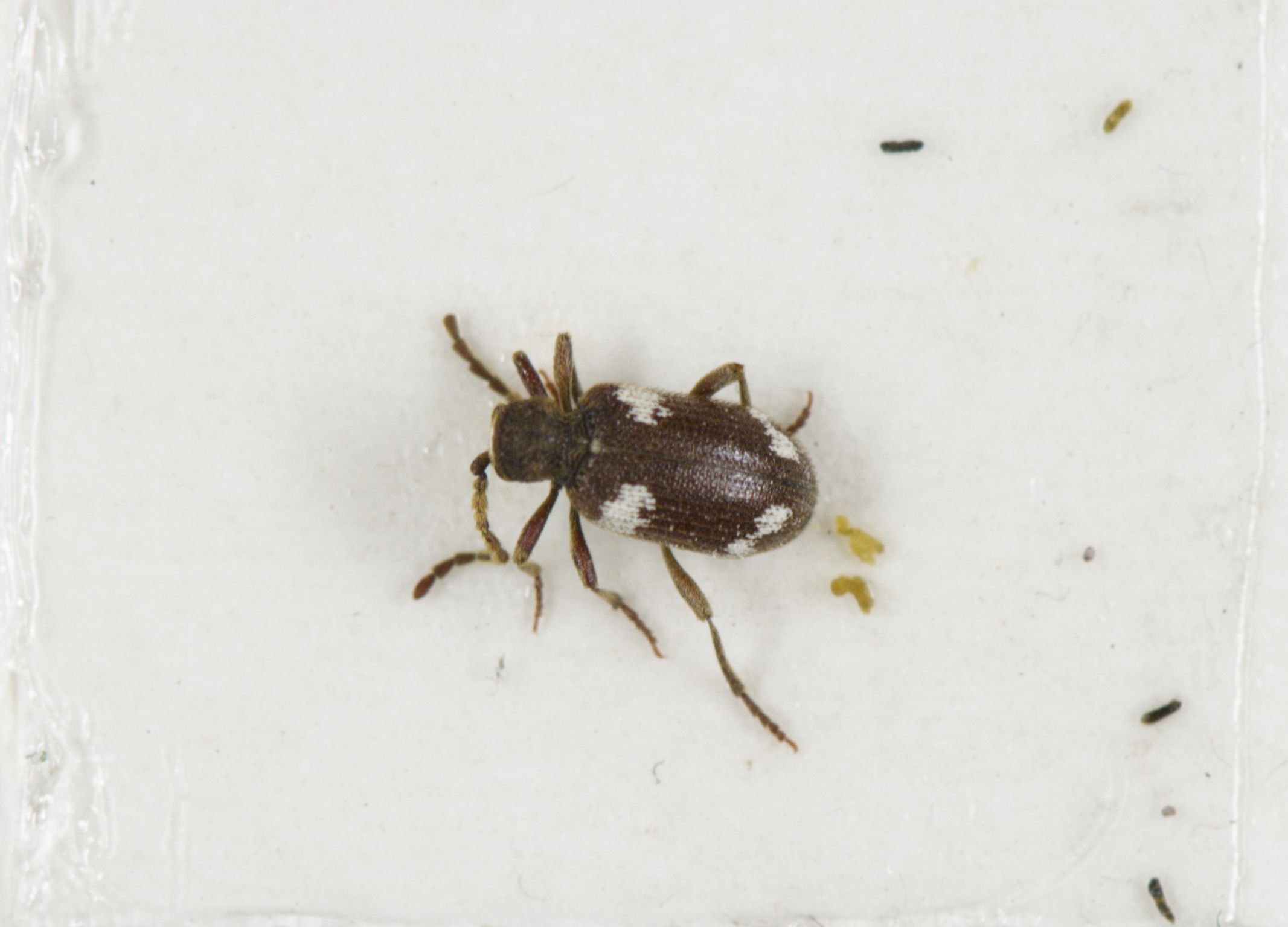
- Ptinus Sexpunctatus caught on a sticky blunder trap in the Yorkshire Museum

Scientific classification
- Kingdom: Animalia
- Phylum: Arthropoda
- Clade: Pancrustacea
- Class: Insecta
- Order: Coleoptera
- Suborder: Polyphaga
- Family: Ptinidae
- Genus: Ptinus
- Species: P. sexpunctatus

Binomial name
- Ptinus sexpunctatus Panzer, 1789

= Ptinus sexpunctatus =

Species of beetle

Ptinus sexpunctatus is a species of beetles in the genus Ptinus of the family Ptinidae. It is commonly known as the six-spotted spider beetle.

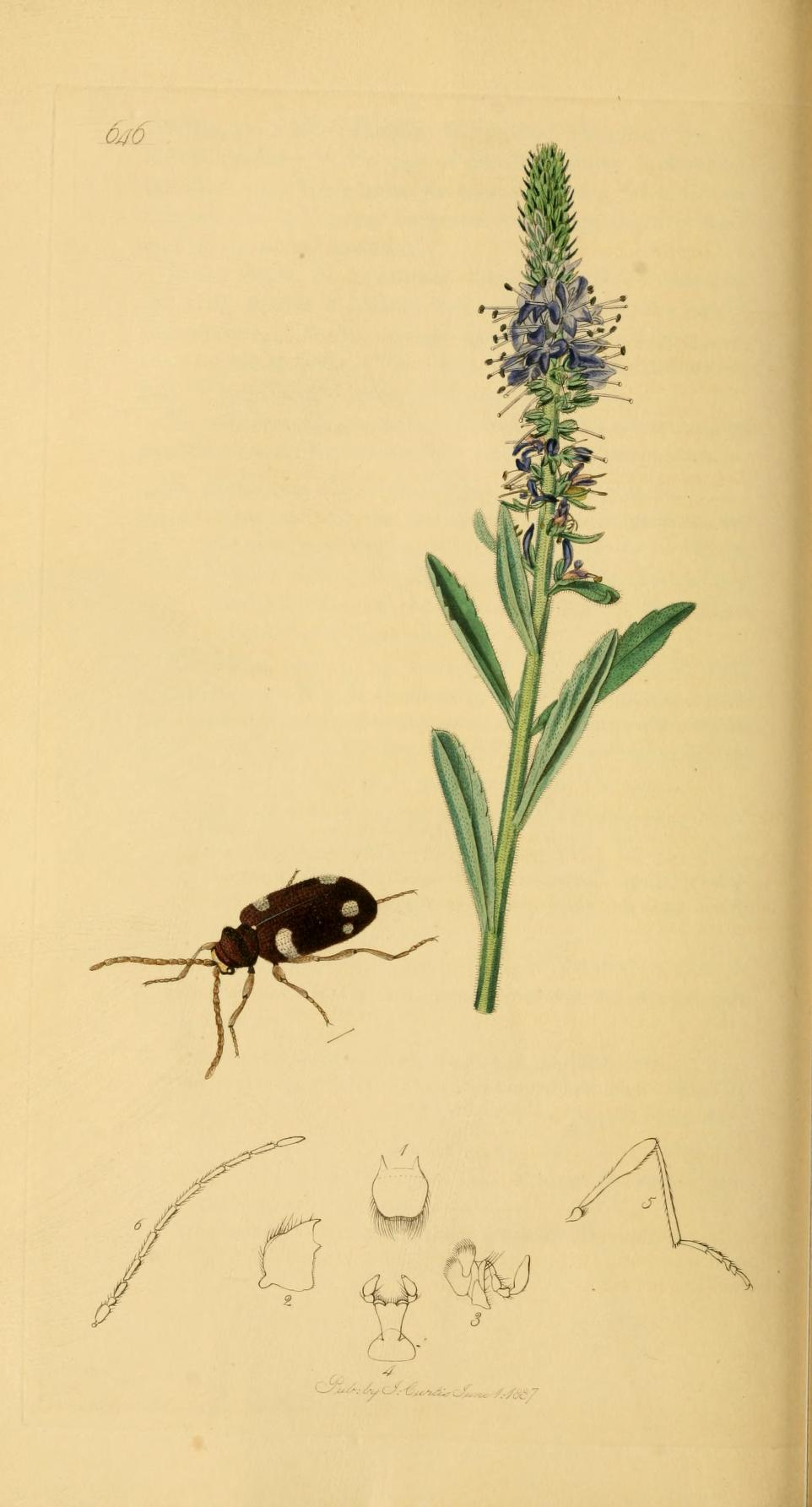
Ptinus sexpunctatus in British Entomology

== Taxonomy ==
P. sexpunctatus is one of eleven species of Ptinid in the subgenus Gynopterus. The subgenus was first described by Mulsant and Rey in 1868.

== Description ==
The species is approximately 4–5 mm in length and is a uniform dark colouration. It has very prominent basal and apical patches of appressed white scale. The grooves on the elytra are very deep.

== Distribution and habitat ==
Ptinus sexpunctatus is a Palearctic spider beetle (Ptinidae: Ptininae) found throughout Europe. In the United Kingdom it is categorised as 'Nationally Notable B' by the National Biodiversity Network and thus appears in between 31 and 100 hectads (10 km grid squares) across the country. In 2007 it was first recorded as an invasive species in North America where it may have imported with introductions of Osmia cornuta and Osmia cornifrons.

The six-spotted spider beetle has been generally associated with pine forests, although more cosmopolitan sightings have occurred indoors. The larvae of P. sexpunctatus are commensals in the nests of cavity-nesting solitary bees in the genera Osmia and Megachile. One example has been recorded, from Nova Scotia, Canada, in the nest of the Blue Orchid Mason Bee (Osmia lignaria). Within the nest, the larvae feed on the food provisions of the host larva.

The prevalence, or at least the recording, of P. sexpunctatus may be increasing due to the rise in the number of commercially available bee hotels used in domestic gardens.
