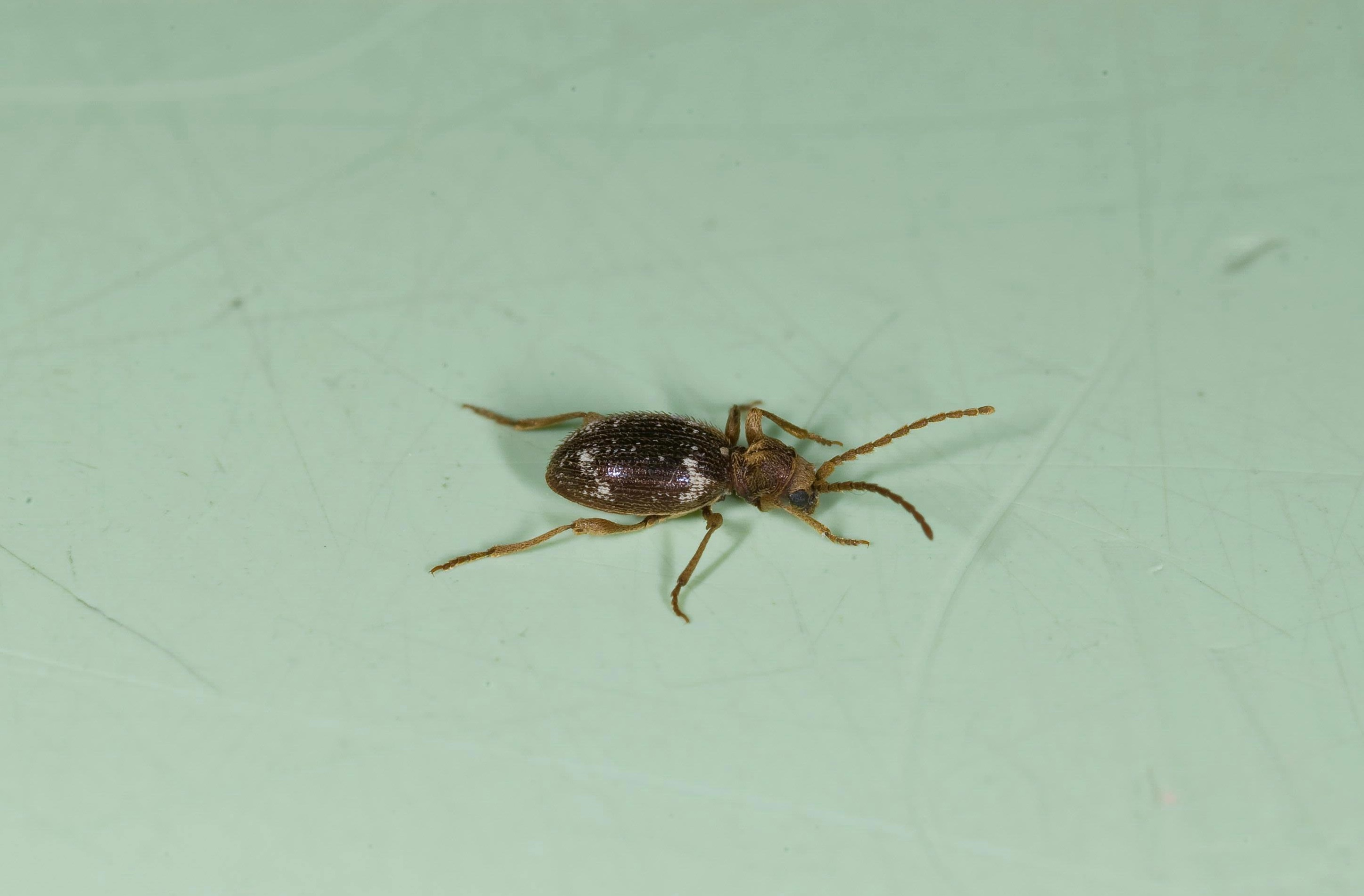
- Ptinus fur

Scientific classification
- Kingdom: Animalia
- Phylum: Arthropoda
- Class: Insecta
- Order: Coleoptera
- Suborder: Polyphaga
- Family: Ptinidae
- Subfamily: Ptininae
- Genus: Ptinus; Linnaeus, 1766

Diversity
- c. 100 species

Synonyms
- Heteroplus Mulsant and Rey, 1868

= Ptinus =

Genus of beetles

Ptinus is a genus of beetles distributed throughout much of the world, including Africa, the Australian region, the Palearctic, the Near East, the Nearctic, and the Neotropical realm. It is a member of the subfamily Ptininae, the spider beetles.

About 24 species have been found associated with stored food products in various parts of the world. Both adults and larvae feed on grain, dried fruit, spices and other dried foodstuffs. The species Ptinus tectus is considered a pest species in Museums and can damage stored objects and collections.

Taxa include:

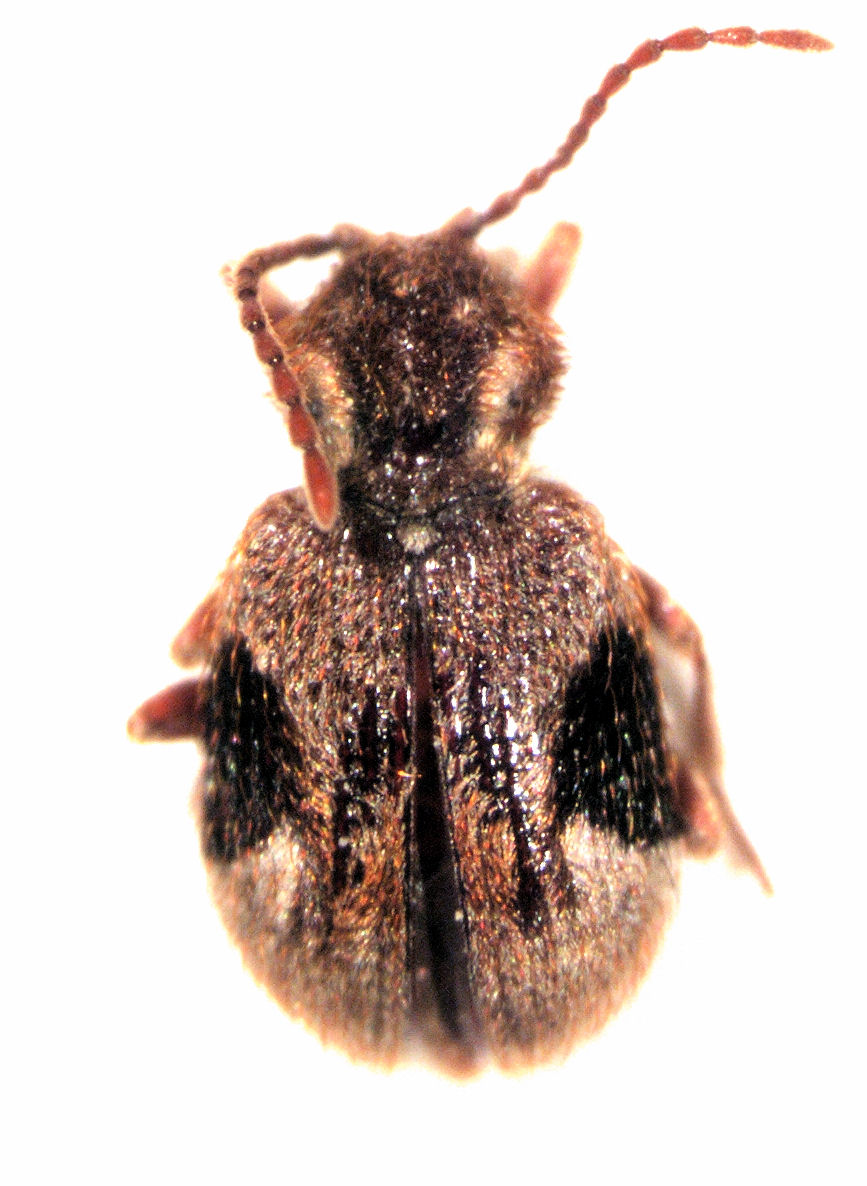
Ptinus plagiatus

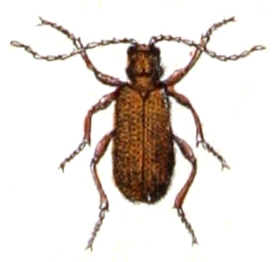
Ptinus latro

- Subgenus Bruchoptinus
  - Ptinus antennatus
  - Ptinus biformis
  - Ptinus brevivittis
  - Ptinus femoralis
  - Ptinus italicus
  - Ptinus ivanensis
  - Ptinus palliatus
  - Ptinus pellitus
  - Ptinus rufipes
  - Ptinus schatzmayeri
  - Ptinus torretassoi
- Subgenus Cyphoderes
  - Ptinus bidens
  - Ptinus hirticornis
  - Ptinus japonicus
  - Ptinus raptor
  - Ptinus schlerethi
- Subgenus Gynopterus
  - Ptinus aubei
  - Ptinus barrosi
  - Ptinus bertranpetiti
  - Ptinus crassicornis
  - Ptinus dubius
  - Ptinus hispaniolaensis
  - Ptinus paulonotatus
  - Ptinus pyrenaeus
  - Ptinus salvatori
  - Ptinus sexpunctatus
  - Ptinus subroseus
  - Ptinus tumidus
  - Ptinus variegatus
- Subgenus Pseudoptinus
  - Ptinus arragonicus
  - Ptinus auberti
  - Ptinus capellae
  - Ptinus coarcticollis
  - Ptinus cumaniensis
  - Ptinus kutzschenbachi
  - Ptinus lichenum
  - Ptinus maculosus
  - Ptinus madoni
  - Ptinus nikitanus
  - Ptinus oertzeni
  - Ptinus rufolimbatus
  - Ptinus rugosicollis
  - Ptinus spissicornis
  - Ptinus subaeneus
  - Ptinus tauricus
- Subgenus Ptinus
  - Ptinus affinis
  - Ptinus argolisanus
  - Ptinus atricapillus
  - Ptinus bicinctus
  - Ptinus calcaratus
  - Ptinus calcarifer
  - Ptinus corsicus
  - Ptinus ellipticus
  - Ptinus explanatus
  - Ptinus fur – whitemarked spider beetle
  - Ptinus gylippus
  - Ptinus kiesenwetteri
  - Ptinus kruperi
  - Ptinus latro
  - Ptinus leprieuri
  - Ptinus mediterraneus
  - Ptinus nigripennis
  - Ptinus obesus
  - Ptinus perplexus
  - Ptinus perrini
  - Ptinus phlomidis
  - Ptinus pilosus
  - Ptinus podolicus
  - Ptinus pusillus
  - Ptinus reitteri
  - Ptinus rufus
  - Ptinus spitzyi
  - Ptinus subpilosus
  - Ptinus tarsalis
  - Ptinus timidus
  - Ptinus villiger
- Subgenus Tectoptinus
  - Ptinus exulans
  - Ptinus tectus – Australian spider beetle

== See also ==
- List of Ptinus species
