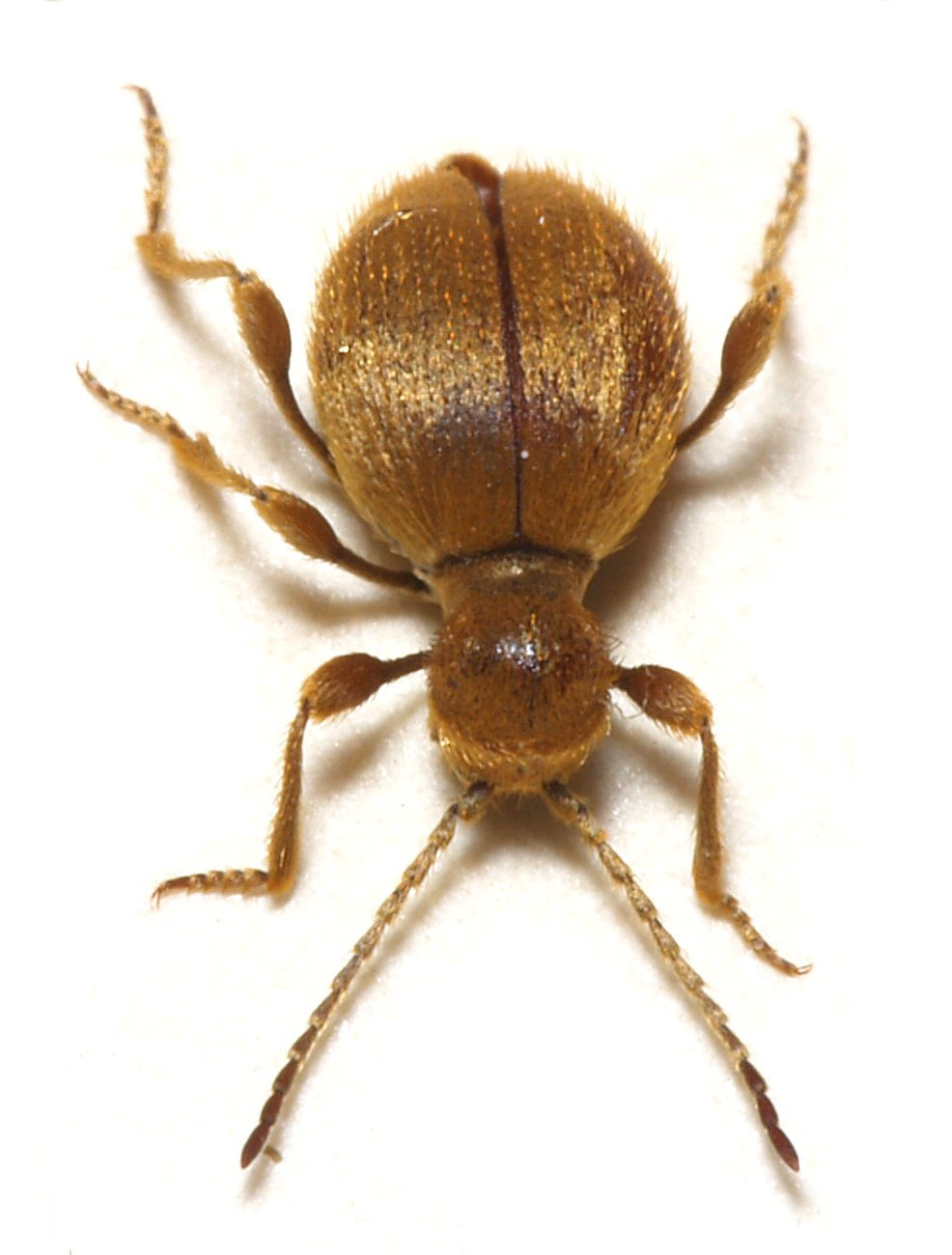
- Niptus hololeucus

Scientific classification
- Kingdom: Animalia
- Phylum: Arthropoda
- Clade: Pancrustacea
- Class: Insecta
- Order: Coleoptera
- Suborder: Polyphaga
- Superfamily: Bostrichoidea
- Family: Ptinidae
- Subfamily: Ptininae; Latreille, 1803

= Spider beetle =

Subfamily of beetles

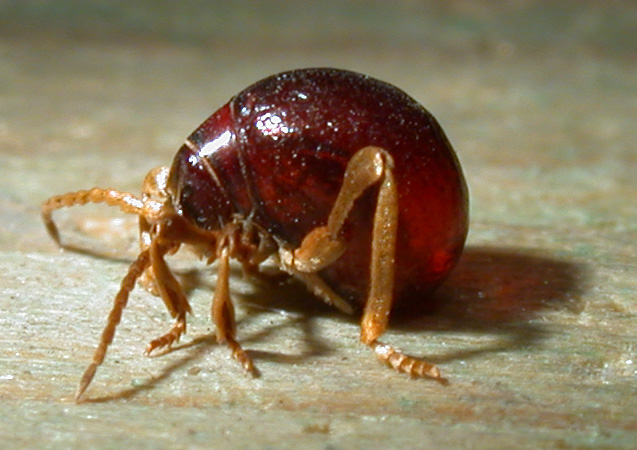
Photograph: Gibbium psylloides

Spider beetles make up the subfamily Ptininae, in the family Ptinidae. There are approximately 70 genera and 600 species in the subfamily, with about 12 genera and 70 species in North America north of Mexico.

Spider beetles have round bodies with long, slender legs. Many species are flightless, either in females only or both sexes. They are generally 1–5 mm long, and reproduce at the rate of two to three generations per year. They are so named because of a resemblance to spiders. Some species have long legs, antennae that can seem like an additional pair of legs, and a body shape that may appear superficially like that of a spider.

The larvae and the adults of most spider beetles are scavengers on dry plant or animal matter, but some species are known to be myrmecophilic, or ant affiliates.

The subfamily Ptininae, along with Anobiinae and several others, were formerly considered members of the family Anobiidae, but the family name has since been changed to Ptinidae.

== Genera ==
These genera belong to the subfamily Ptininae:

- Acanthaptinus Philips, 2005
- Africogenius Borowski, 2000
- Bellesus Özdikmen, 2010
- Casapus Wollaston, 1862^{g}
- Cavoptinus Pic, 1931
- Chilenogenius Pic, 1947
- Coleoaethes Philips, 1998^{g}
- Cryptopeniculus Philips, 2004^{g}
- Cylindroptinus Pic, 1910
- Cyphoniptus Bellés, 1992
- Dignomus Wollaston, 1862^{g}
- Diphobia Olliff, 1886
- Diplocotes Westwood, 1869^{g}
- Diplocotidus Peringuey, 1899
- Ectrephes Pascoe, 1866^{g}
- Enasiba Olliff, 1886
- Epauloecus Mulsant & Rey, 1868^{b}
- Eurostodes Reitter, 1884^{g}
- Eurostoptinus Pic, 1895
- Gibbium Scopoli, 1777^{i c g b}
- Gnostus Westwood, 1855^{i c g b}
- Hanumanus Bellés, 1991
- Hexaplocotes Lea, 1906
- Kedirinus Bellés, 1991^{g}
- Lachnoniptus Philips, 1998^{g}
- Lapidoniptus Belles, 1981^{g}
- Luzonoptinus Pic, 1923
- Maheoptinus Pic, 1903
- Meziomorphum Pic, 1898^{g}
- Mezium Curtis, 1828^{i c g b}
- Myrmecoptinus Wasmann, 1916^{g}
- Neoptinus Gahan, 1900
- Niptinus Fall, 1905^{i c g b}
- Niptodes Reitter, 1884^{g}
- Niptomezium Pic, 1902
- Niptus Boieldieu, 1856^{i c g b}
- Okamninus Mynhardt & Philips, 2013^{g}
- Oviedinus Bellés, 2010^{g}
- Paulianoptinus Bellés, 1991
- Paussoptinus Lea, 1905
- Piarus Wollaston, 1862^{g}
- Pitnus Gorham, 1883^{i c g}
- Polyplocotes Westwood, 1869
- Prosternoptinus Bellés, 1985
- Pseudeurostus Heyden, 1906^{i c g b}
- Ptinus Linnaeus, 1766^{i c g b}
- Silisoptinus Pic, 1917
- Singularivultus Bellés, 1991
- Sphaericus Wollaston, 1854^{i c g b}
- Stereocaulophilus Belles, 1994^{g}
- Sucinoptinus Bellés, 2007^{g}
- Sulcoptinus Bellés, 1988^{g}
- Tipnus Thomson, 1863^{i c g}
- Trigonogenioptinus Pic, 1937
- Trigonogenius Solier, 1849^{i g b}
- Tropicoptinus Belles, 1998^{g}
- Trymolophus Bellés, 1990^{g}
- Xylodes Waterhouse, 1876^{g}

Data sources: i = ITIS, c = Catalogue of Life, g = GBIF, b = Bugguide.net

== Gallery ==
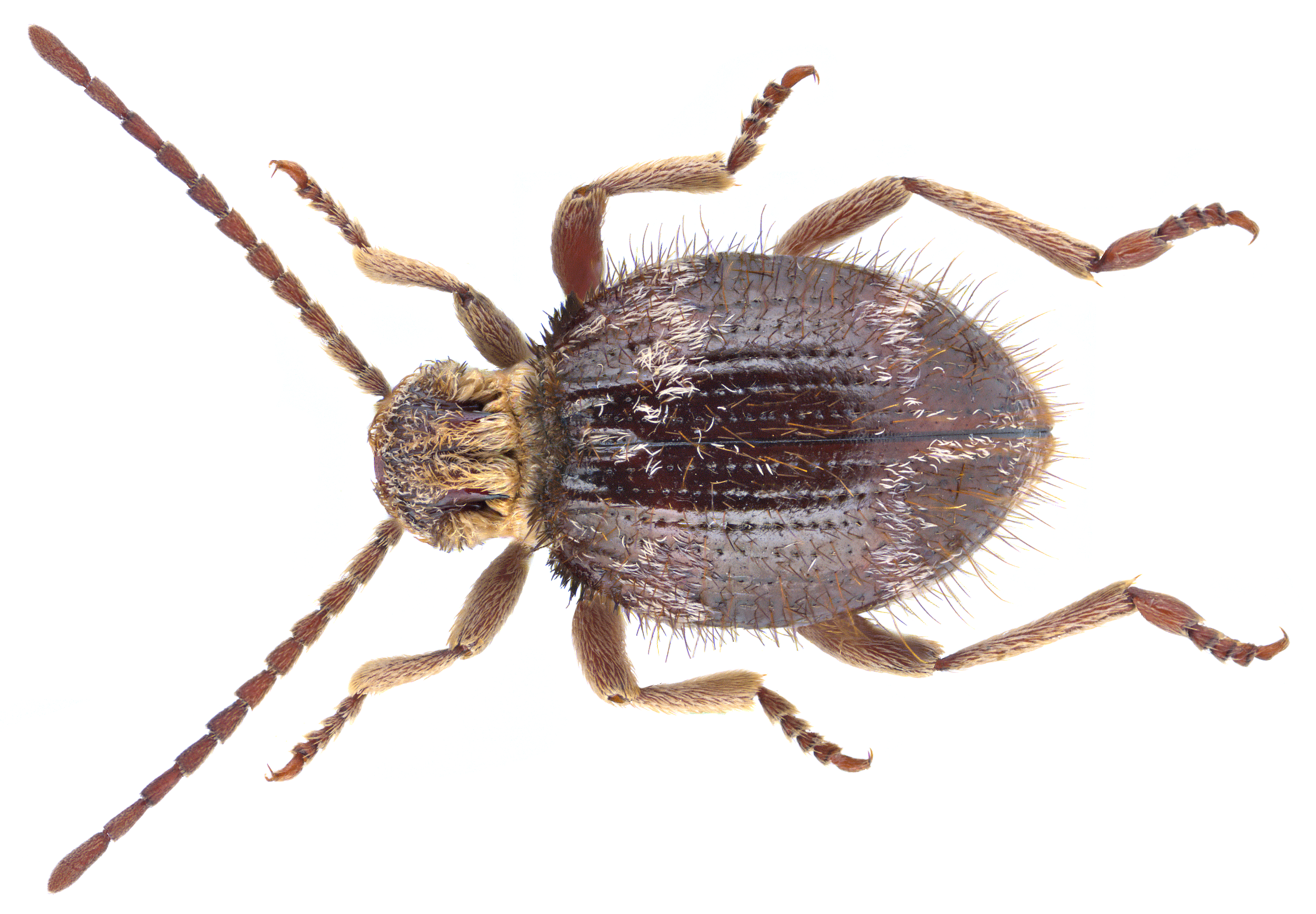
Casapus radiosus

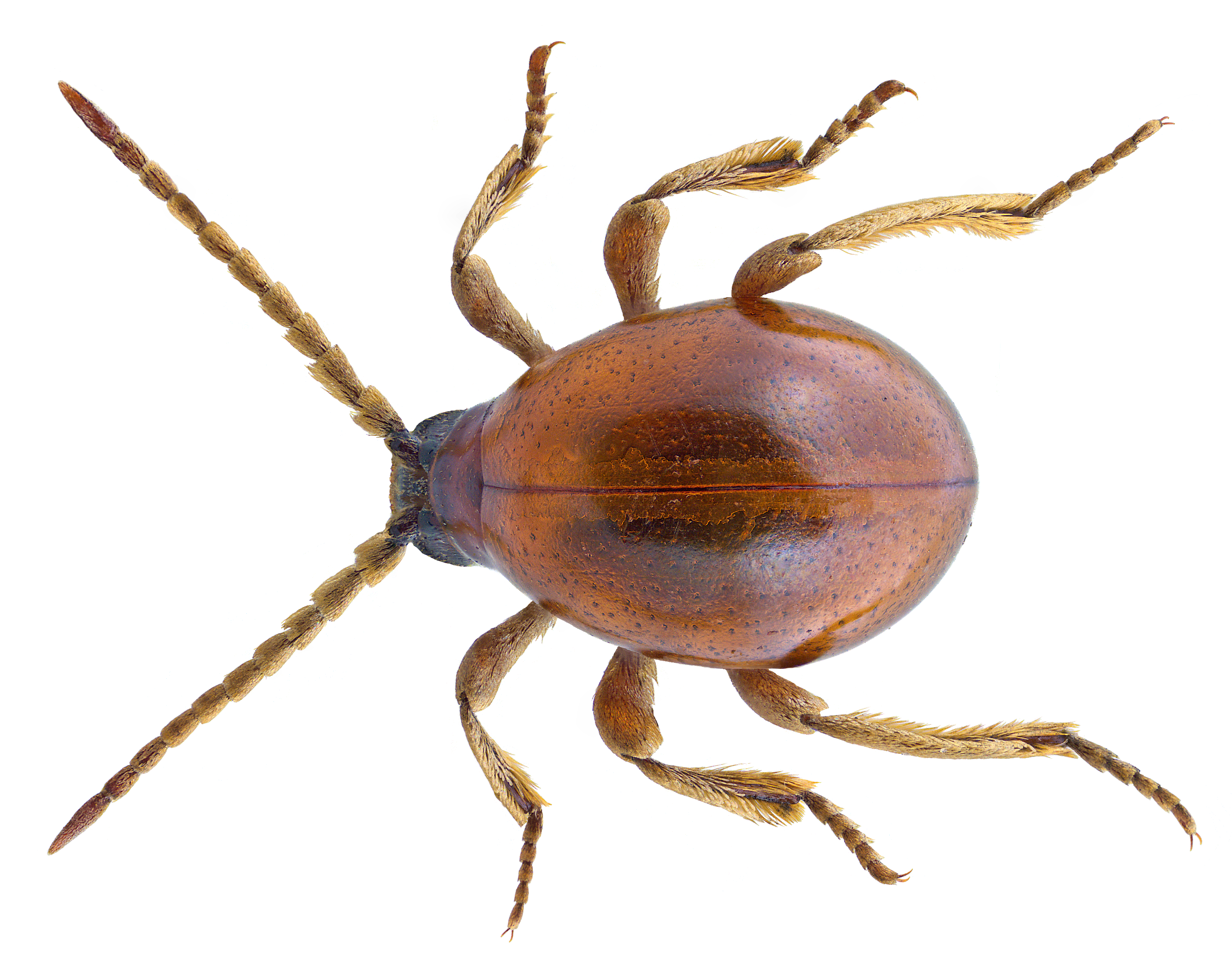
Gibbium psylloides

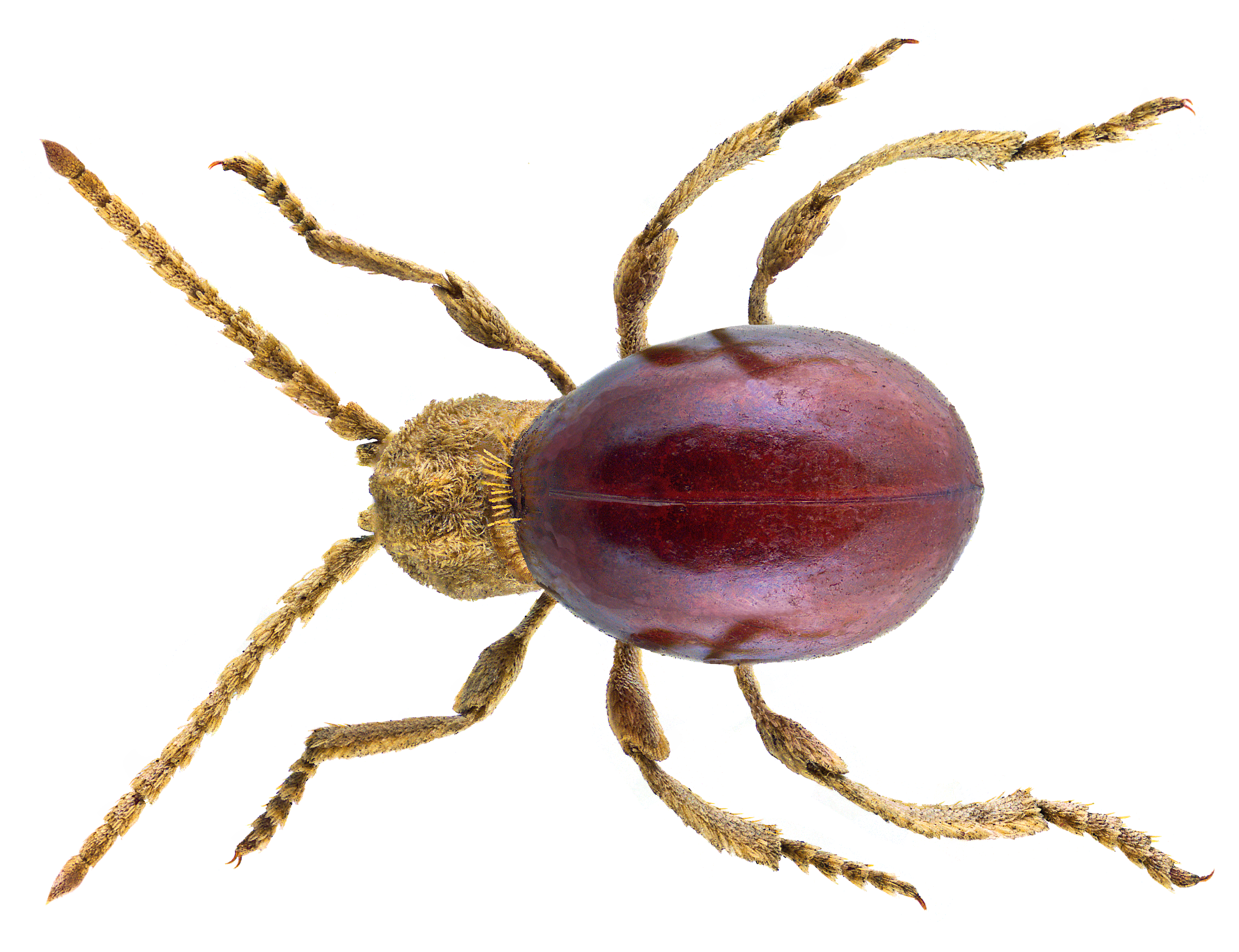
Mezium affine

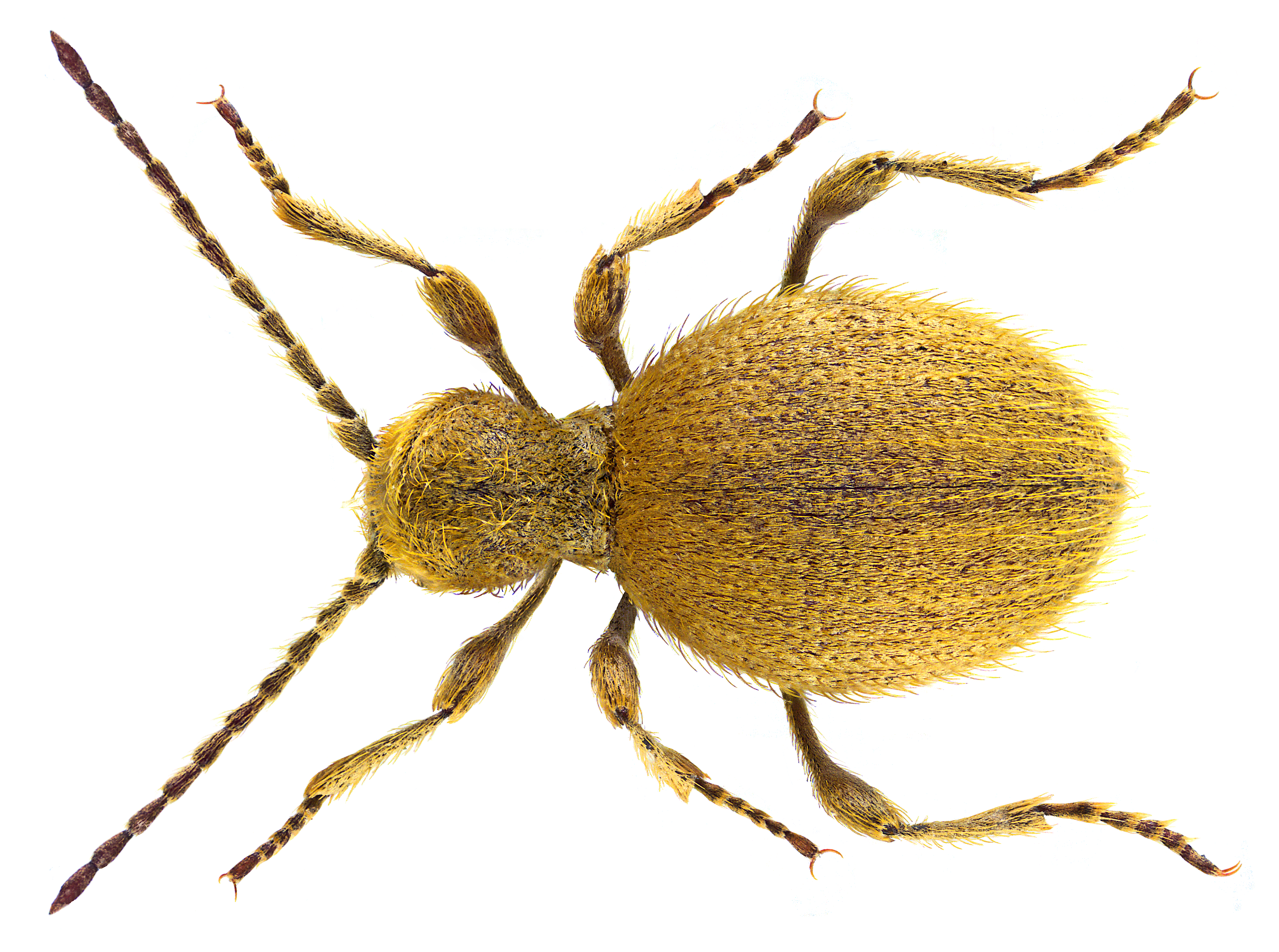
Niptus hololeucus

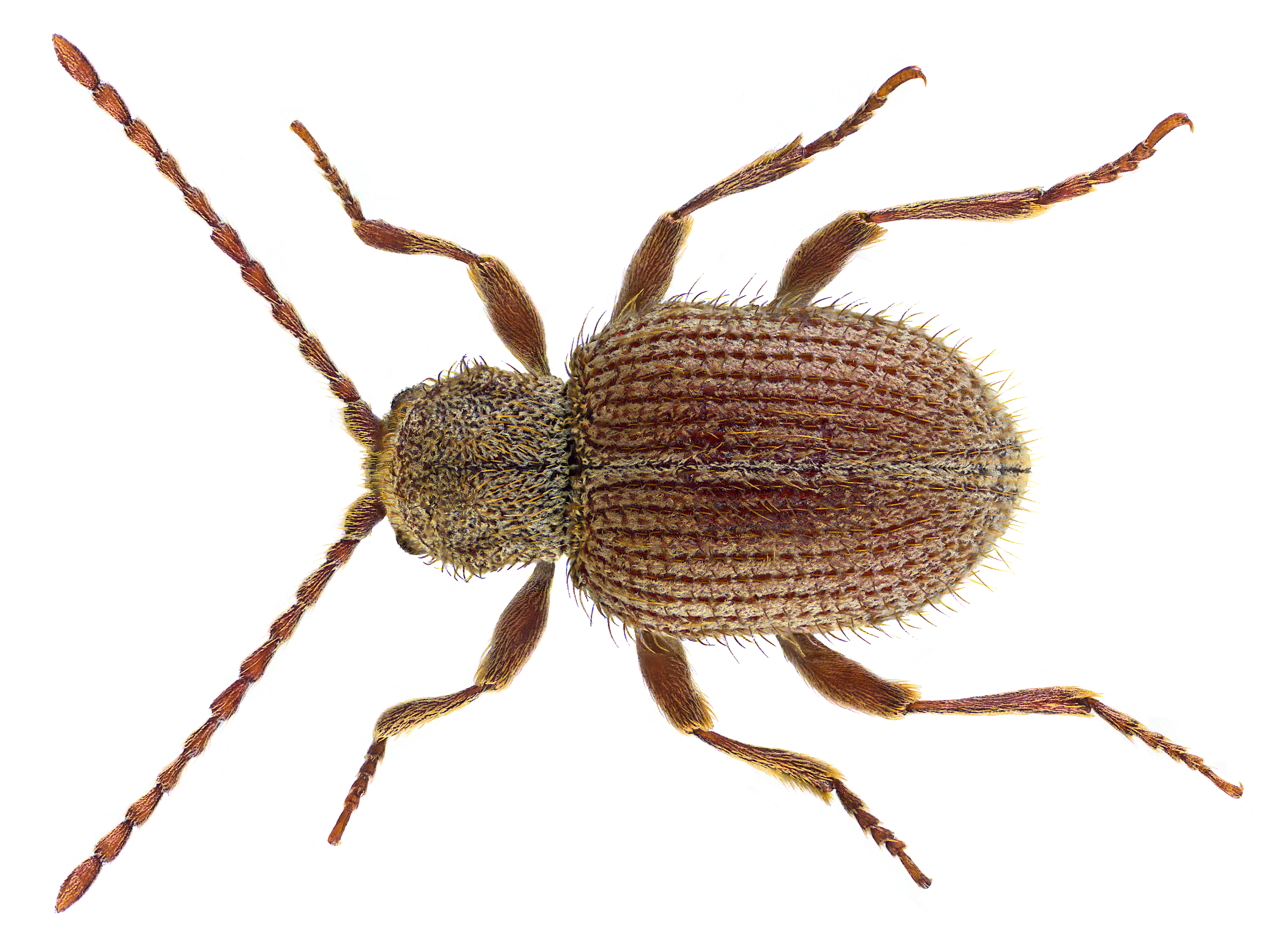
Pseudeurostus hilleri

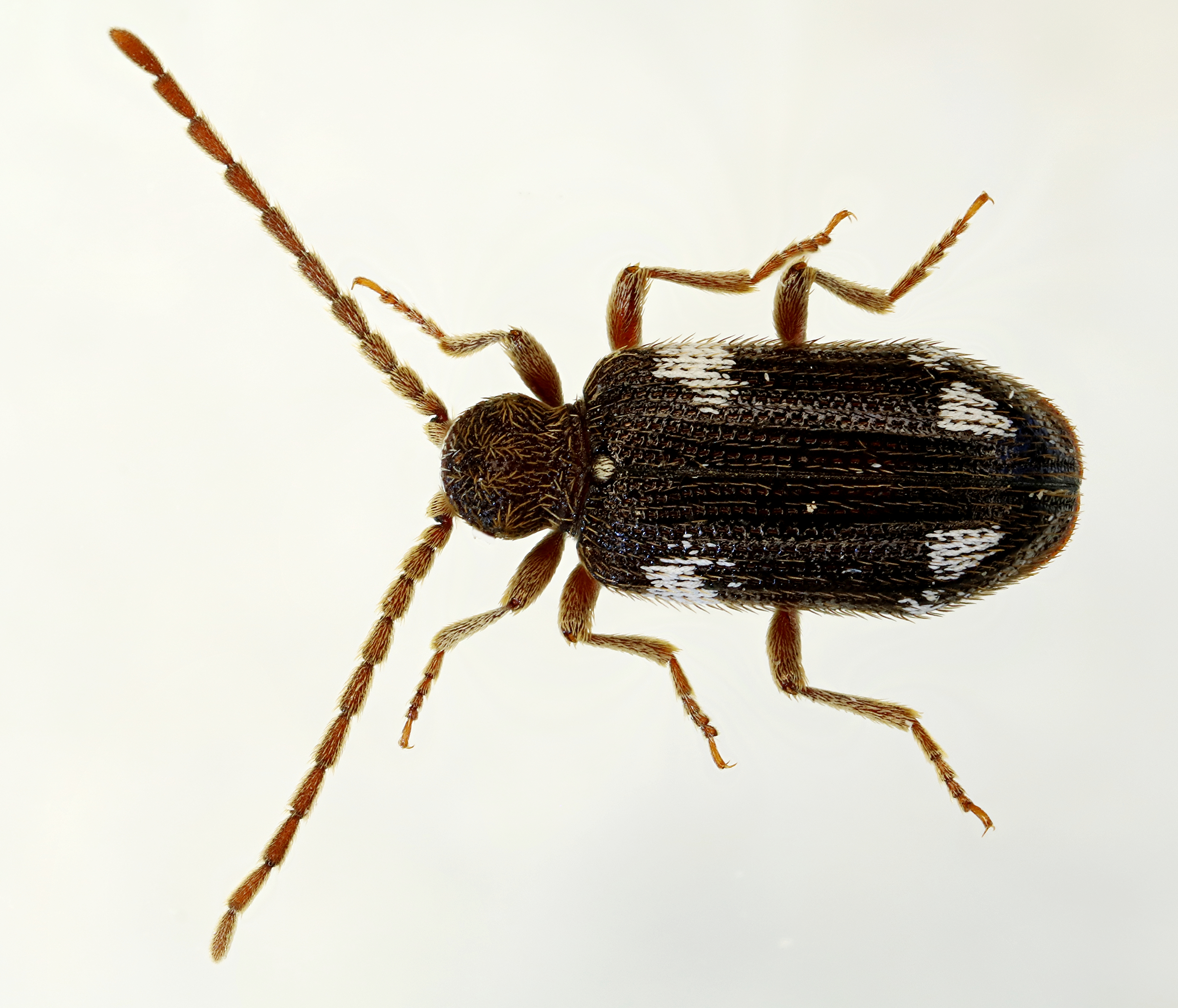
Ptinus sexpunctatus

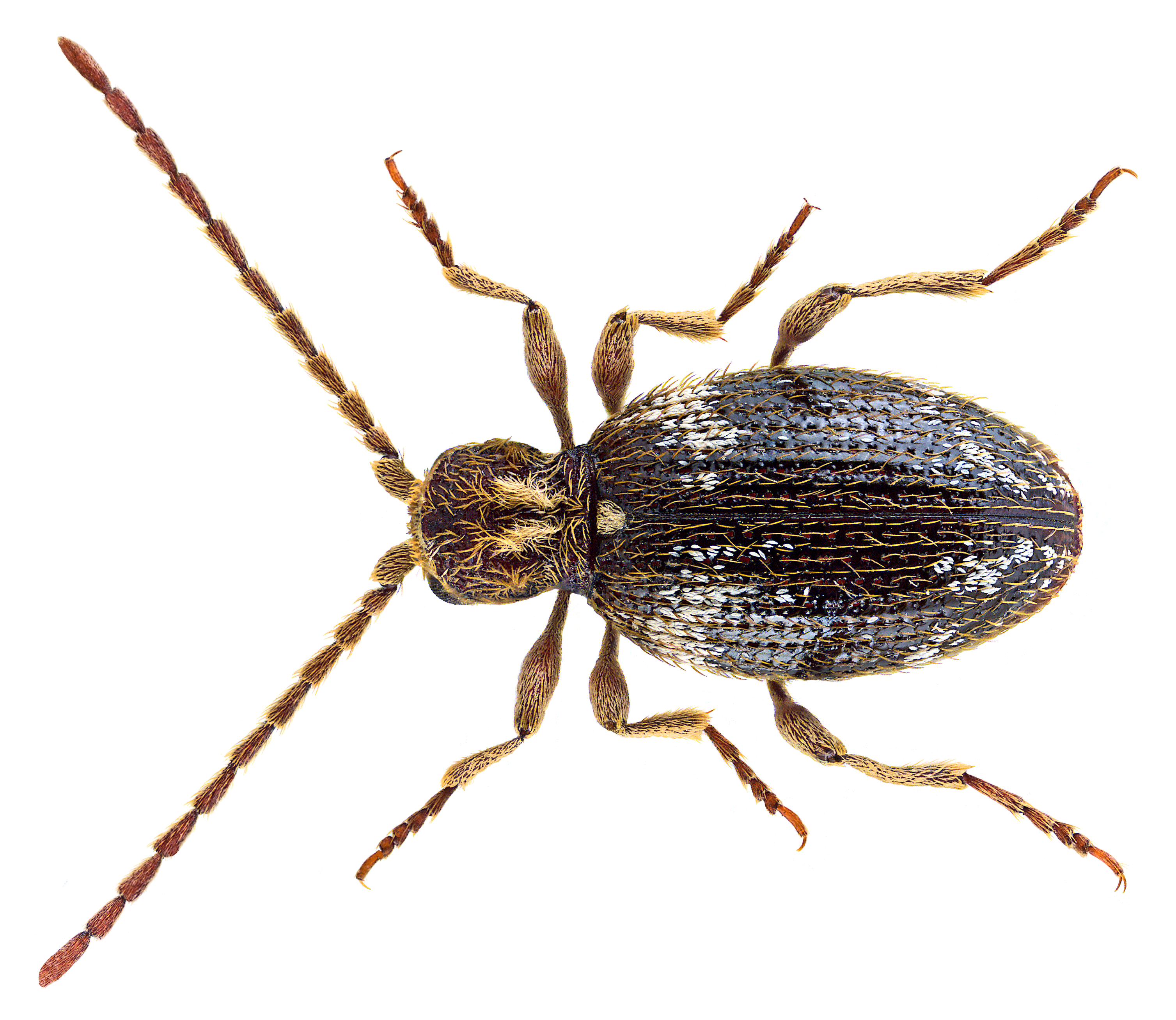
Ptinus fur female

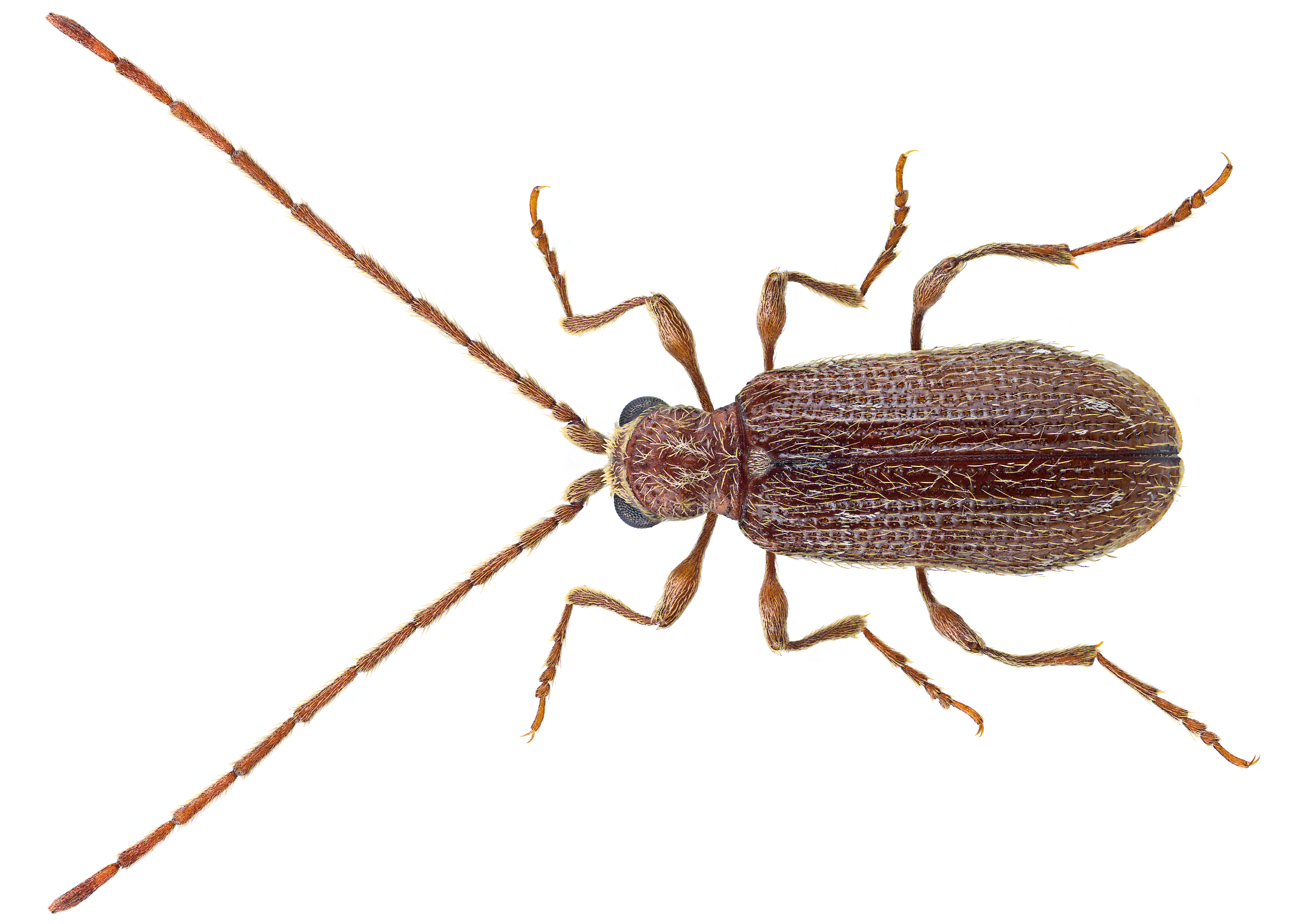
Ptinus fur male

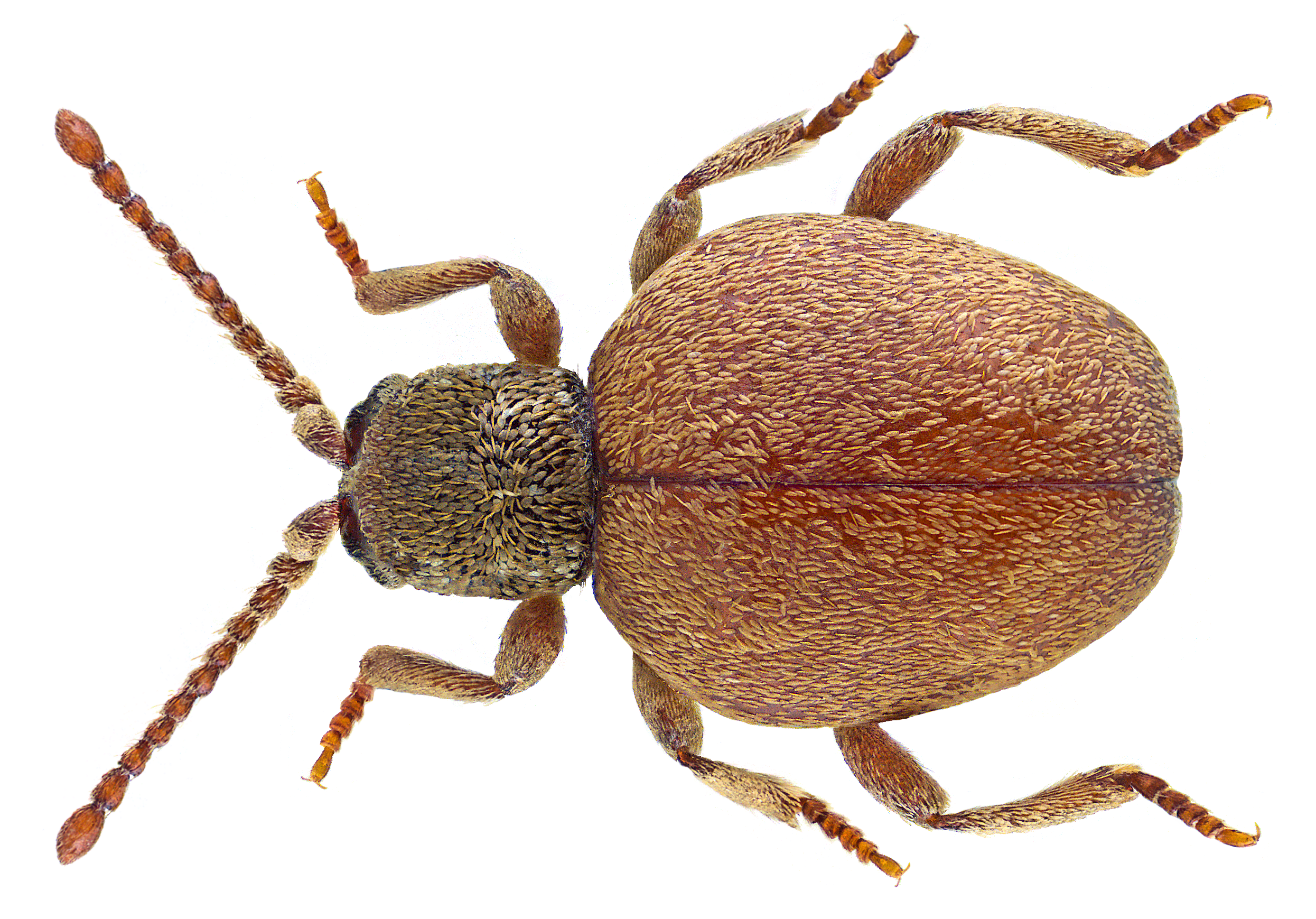
Sphaericus gibbioides

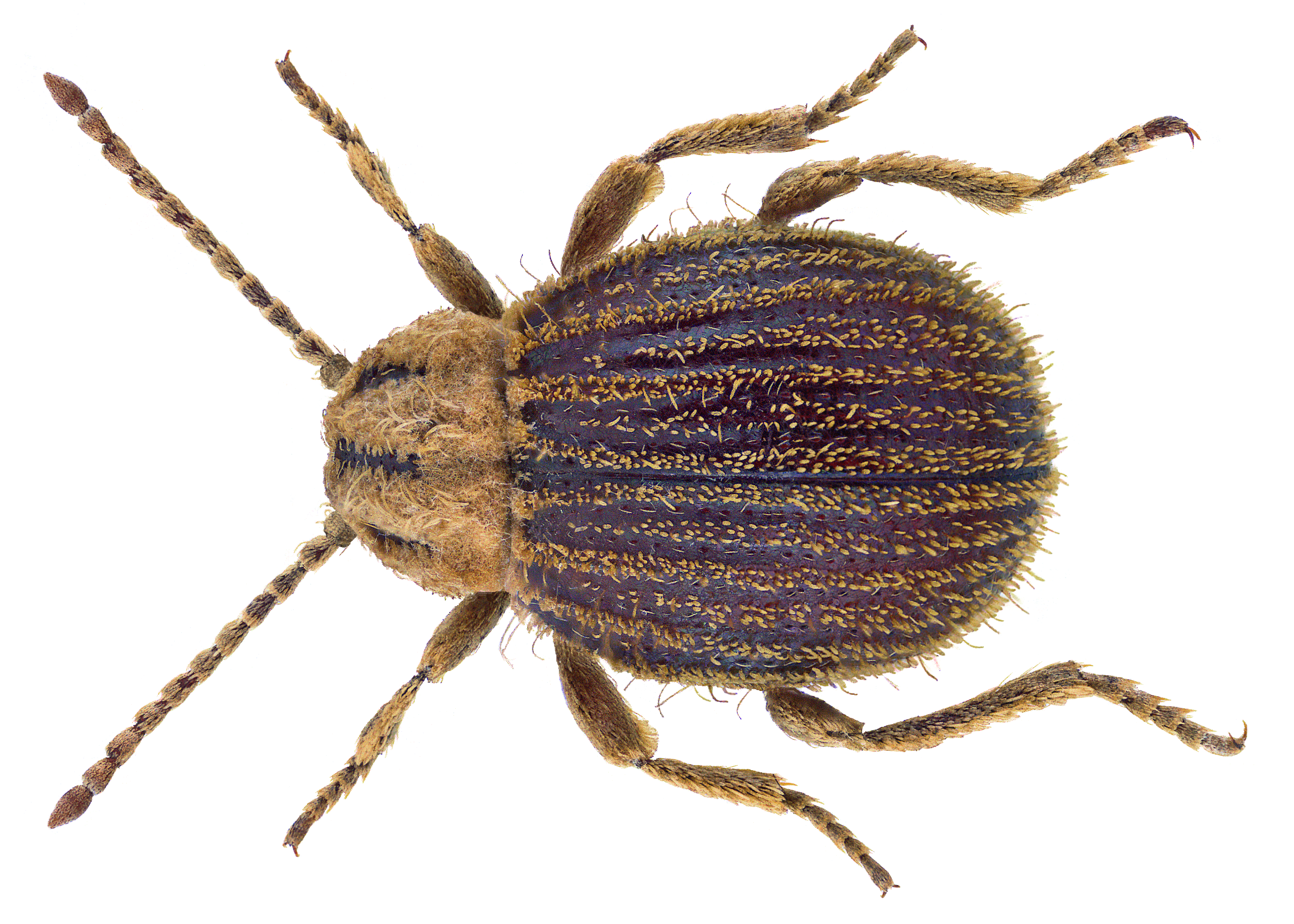
Stethomezium squamosum
Syn.- Stethomezium notiale

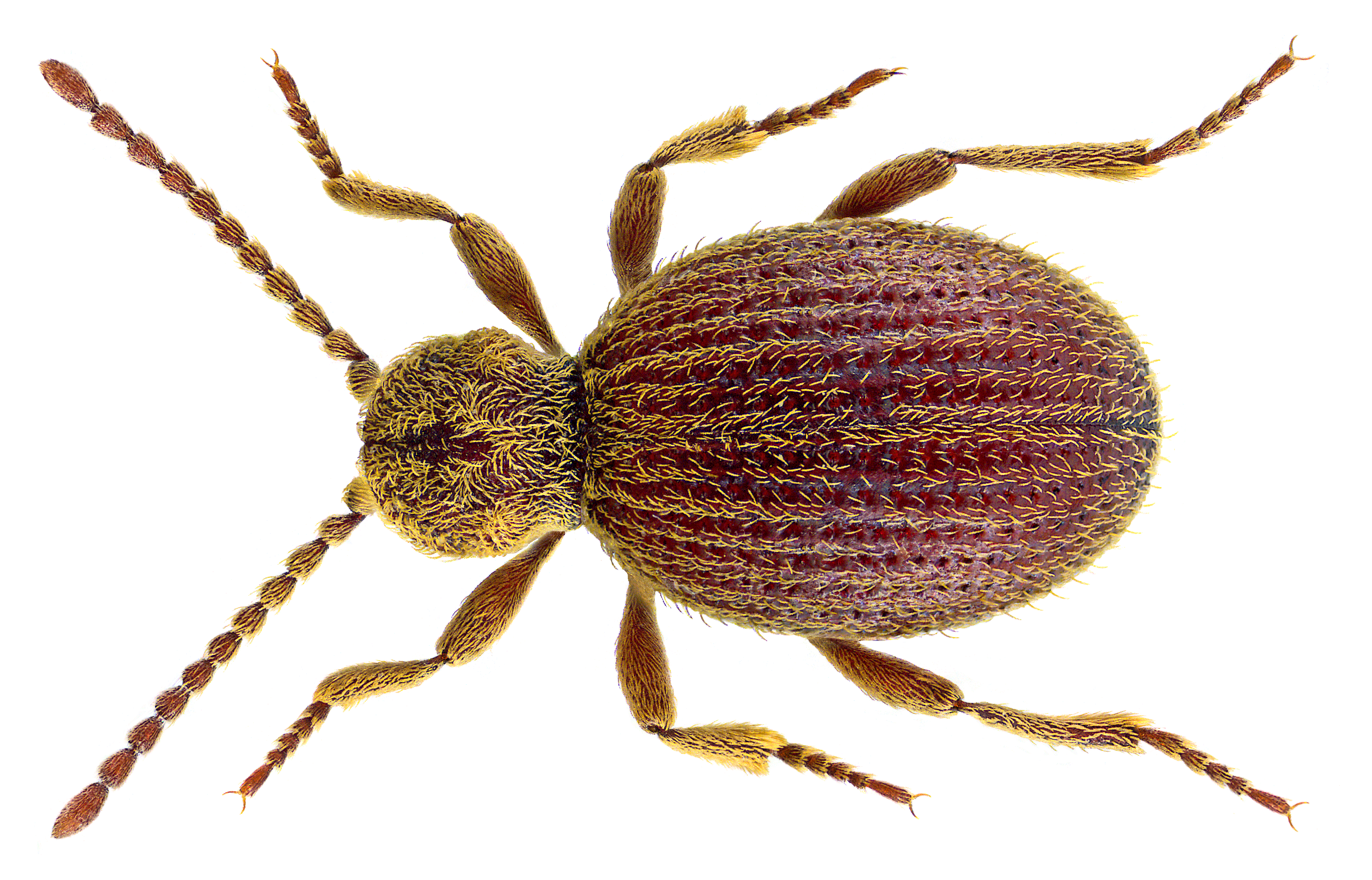
Tipnus unicolor

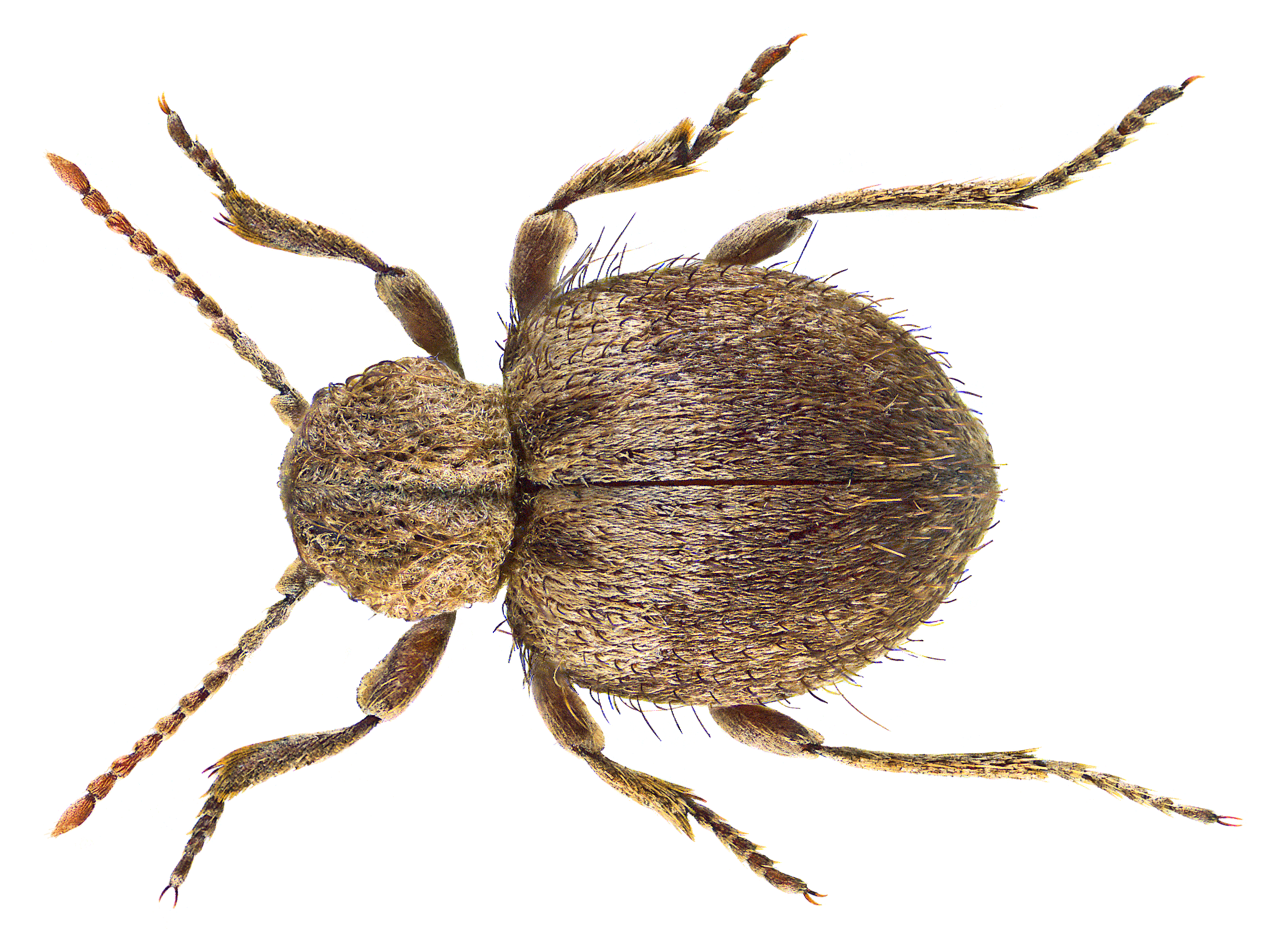
Trigonogenius globulum

== See also ==
- List of Ptinidae genera
