= Niptinus =

Scientific classification
- Kingdom: Animalia
- Phylum: Arthropoda
- Clade: Pancrustacea
- Class: Insecta
- Order: Coleoptera
- Suborder: Polyphaga
- Family: Ptinidae
- Subfamily: Ptininae
- Tribe: Ptinini
- Genus: Niptinus; Fall, 1905

Genus of beetles

Niptinus is a genus of spider beetles in the family Ptinidae. There are at least two described species in Niptinus.

== Species ==
These two species belong to the genus Niptinus:

- Niptinus ovipennis Fall, 1905
- Niptinus unilineatus (Pic, 1900)
