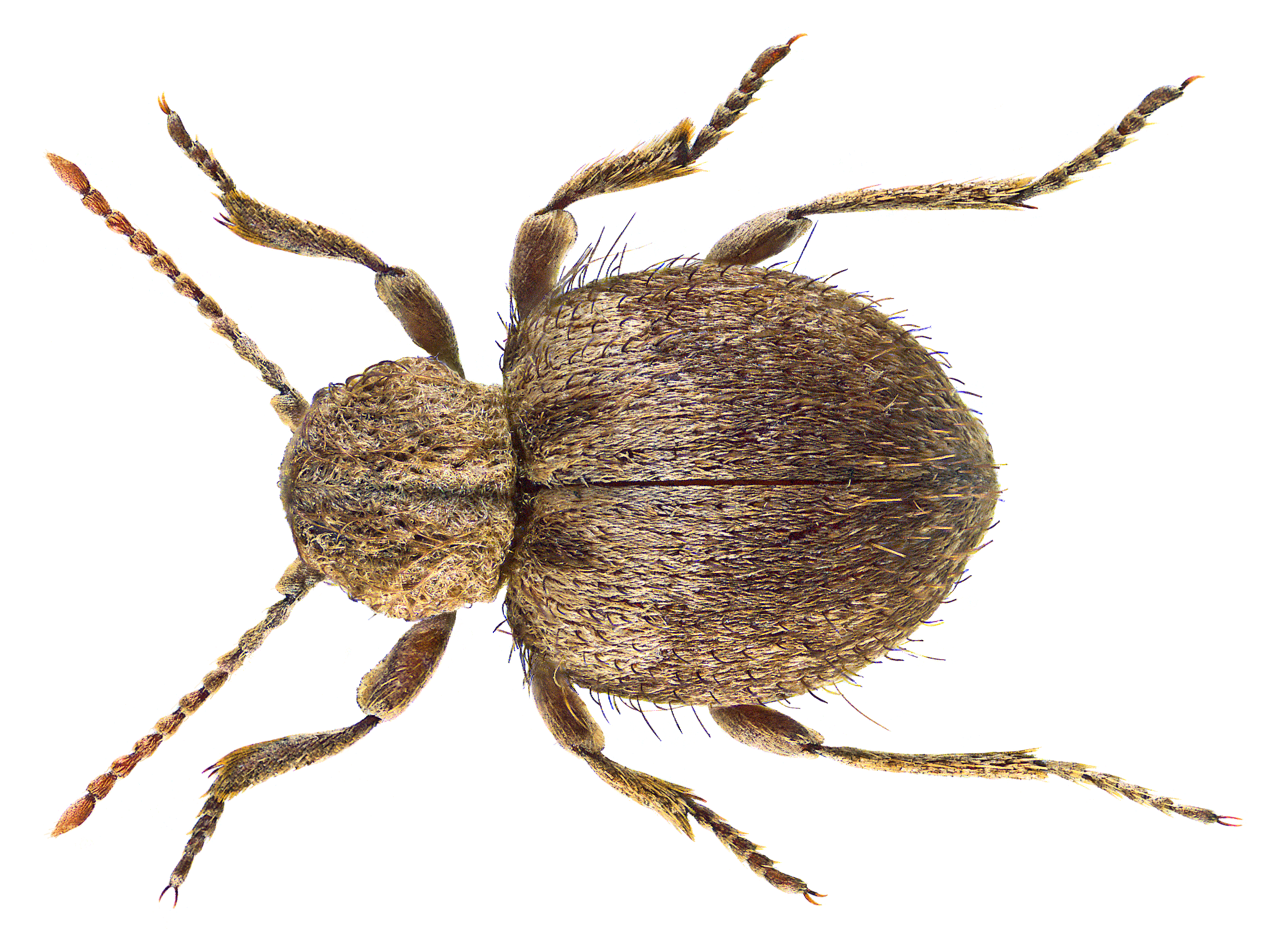

Scientific classification
- Kingdom: Animalia
- Phylum: Arthropoda
- Clade: Pancrustacea
- Class: Insecta
- Order: Coleoptera
- Suborder: Polyphaga
- Family: Ptinidae
- Tribe: Ptinini
- Genus: Trigonogenius
- Species: T. globulum

Binomial name
- Trigonogenius globulum (Solier, 1849)

Synonyms
- Ptinus globulum Solier, 1849; Ptinus globulum var. α globosus Solier, 1849; Trigonogenius globosus (Solier, 1849); Trigonogenius globulus Auctt. (Missp.)

= Trigonogenius globulum =

Species of beetle

Trigonogenius globulum, the globular spider beetle, is a species of spider beetle in the family Ptinidae. It is found in Africa, Australia, Europe and Northern Asia (excluding China), North America, and South America. The species name has been frequently misspelled as globulus.

== Taxonomy ==
The species name was originally published as Ptinus globulum by Solier in 1849, under the "section" (equivalent to a subgenus) he named therein as Trigonogenius. Numerous subsequent authors have historically misspelled the name as globulus, though some sources still use the correct spelling (e.g.,). Solier, in the same work, named a variety of this species as "var. α globosus", which has only added to confusion surrounding the correct spelling (e.g.,), and other sources treat globosus as a subspecies of globulum (e.g.,).
