= Pseudeurostus kelleri =

Scientific classification
- Kingdom: Animalia
- Phylum: Arthropoda
- Clade: Pancrustacea
- Class: Insecta
- Order: Coleoptera
- Suborder: Polyphaga
- Family: Ptinidae
- Tribe: Ptinini
- Genus: Pseudeurostus
- Species: P. kelleri

Binomial name
- Pseudeurostus kelleri Brown, 1959

Species of beetle

Pseudeurostus kelleri is a species of spider beetle in the family Ptinidae. It is found in North America.
