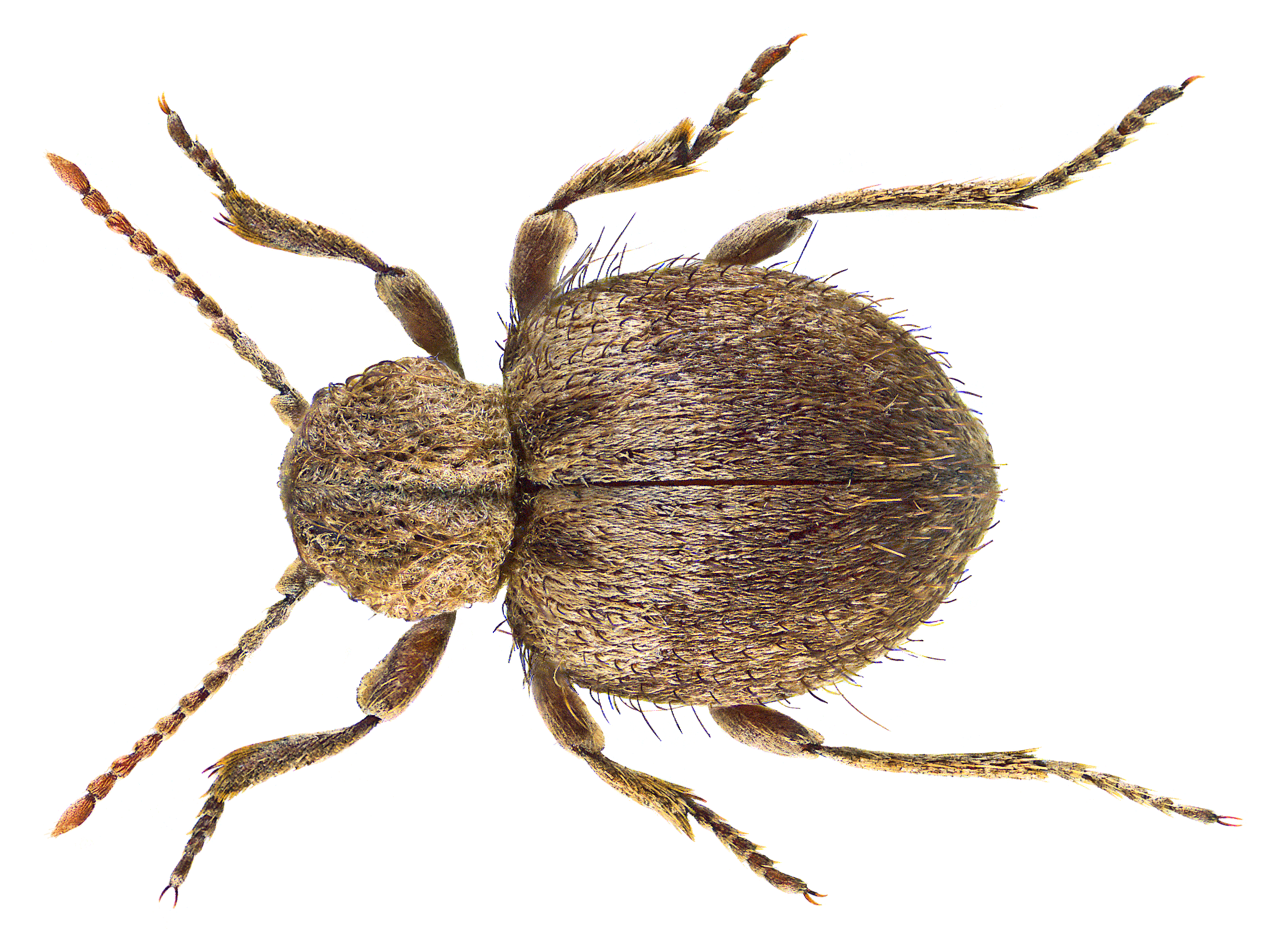
- Trigonogenius globulum

Scientific classification
- Kingdom: Animalia
- Phylum: Arthropoda
- Clade: Pancrustacea
- Class: Insecta
- Order: Coleoptera
- Suborder: Polyphaga
- Family: Ptinidae
- Subfamily: Ptininae
- Tribe: Ptinini
- Genus: Trigonogenius; Solier, 1849

Type species
- Trigonogenius globulum (Solier, 1849)

= Trigonogenius =

Genus of beetles

Trigonogenius is a genus of spider beetles in the family Ptinidae. There are five or six described species in Trigonogenius.

== Species ==
- Trigonogenius denticulatus Wichmann & H.E., 1915a
- Trigonogenius fallax Hagedorn, 1912c
- Trigonogenius globulum (Solier, 1849) (globular spider beetle)
- Trigonogenius imitans Eggers, 1920
- Trigonogenius similis Eggers, 1920
