= Niptinus unilineatus =

Scientific classification
- Kingdom: Animalia
- Phylum: Arthropoda
- Clade: Pancrustacea
- Class: Insecta
- Order: Coleoptera
- Suborder: Polyphaga
- Family: Ptinidae
- Tribe: Ptinini
- Genus: Niptinus
- Species: N. unilineatus

Binomial name
- Niptinus unilineatus (Pic, 1900)

Species of beetle

Niptinus unilineatus is a species of spider beetle in the family Ptinidae. It is found in Central America and North America.
