= Niptinus ovipennis =

Scientific classification
- Kingdom: Animalia
- Phylum: Arthropoda
- Clade: Pancrustacea
- Class: Insecta
- Order: Coleoptera
- Suborder: Polyphaga
- Family: Ptinidae
- Tribe: Ptinini
- Genus: Niptinus
- Species: N. ovipennis

Binomial name
- Niptinus ovipennis Fall, 1905

Species of beetle

Niptinus ovipennis is a species of spider beetle in the family Ptinidae. It is found in North America.
