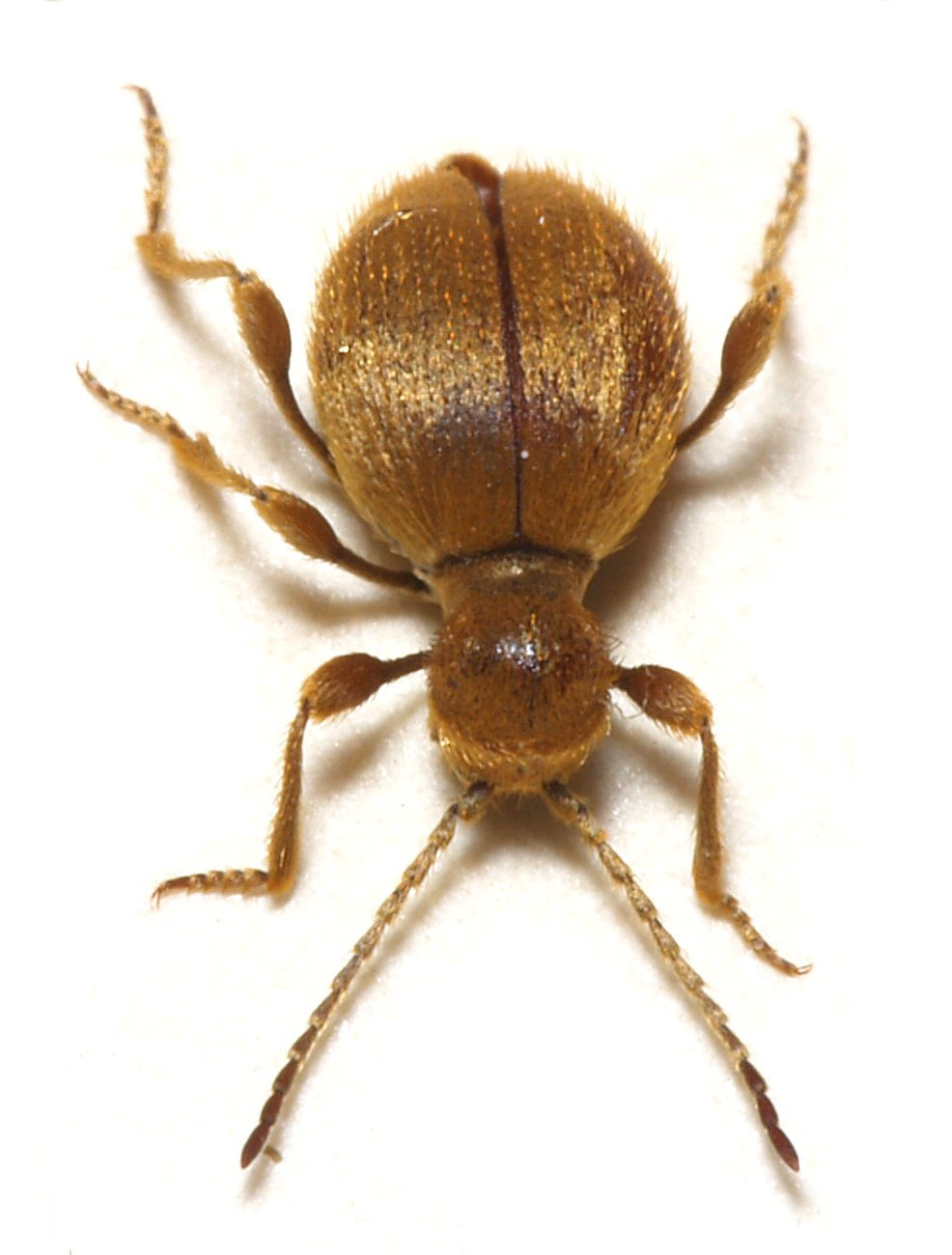

Scientific classification
- Kingdom: Animalia
- Phylum: Arthropoda
- Clade: Pancrustacea
- Class: Insecta
- Order: Coleoptera
- Suborder: Polyphaga
- Family: Ptinidae
- Genus: Niptus
- Species: N. hololeucus

Binomial name
- Niptus hololeucus (Faldermann, 1836)

= Golden spider beetle =

Species of beetle

The golden spider beetle, Niptus hololeucus, is a species of spider beetle in the family Ptinidae.

== Description ==
Niptus hololeucus is 3–4.5mm in length. Its body is covered in silky golden hairs and fine scales.

== Habitat ==
Niptus hololeucus may be a pest of a wide variety of cereal based food products. In 1981 an account of an infestation of these beetles was located in a roof void above offices in Rotherham, U.K. This was found to be due to wild pigeons which were nesting within the loft: the beetles and their larvae were feeding upon their waste matter.

== Distribution ==
It is a temperate species originating in West Asia but now cosmopolitan. It is widespread across western Europe. A single record was first recorded in Iran in a cave 2014. N. hololeucus is one of the two species of Niptus to be found in caves.

== Gallery ==
Scanning electron microscope images of Niptus hololeucus
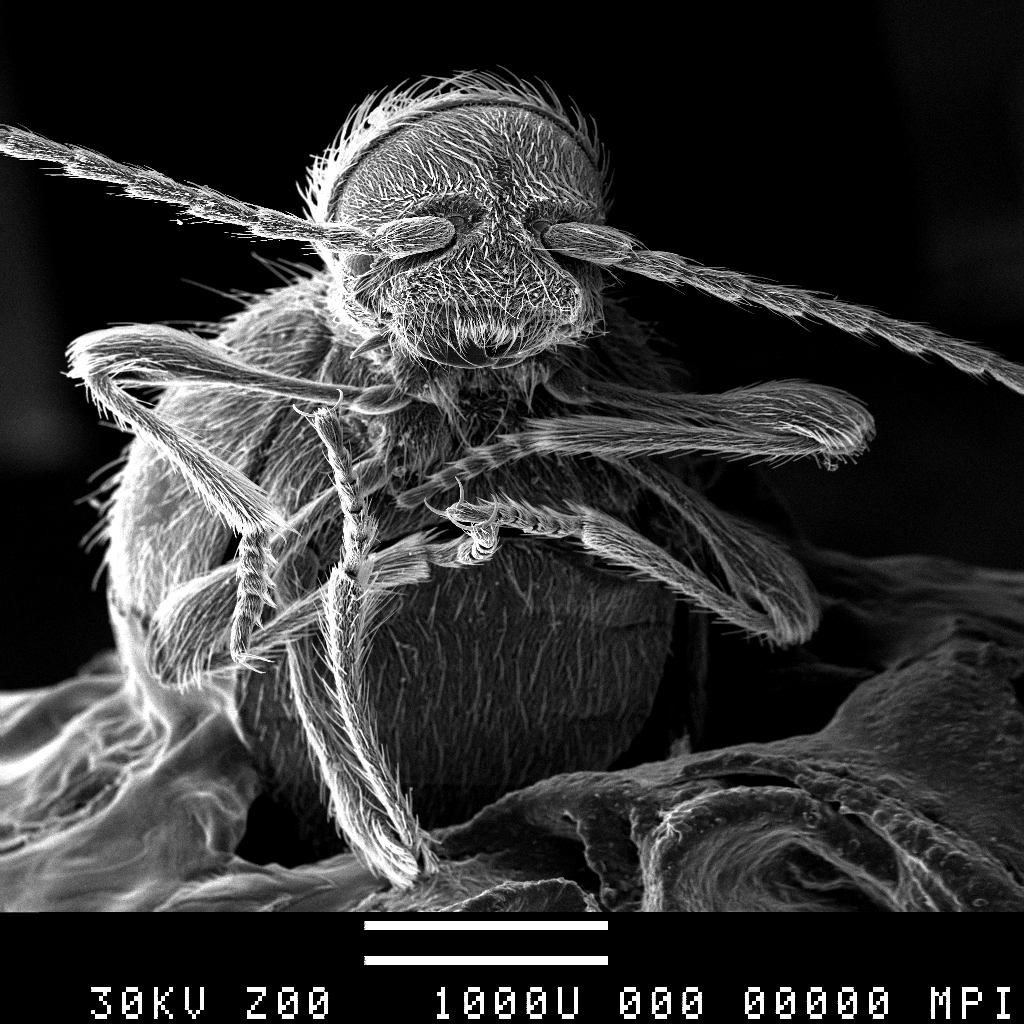
front and below

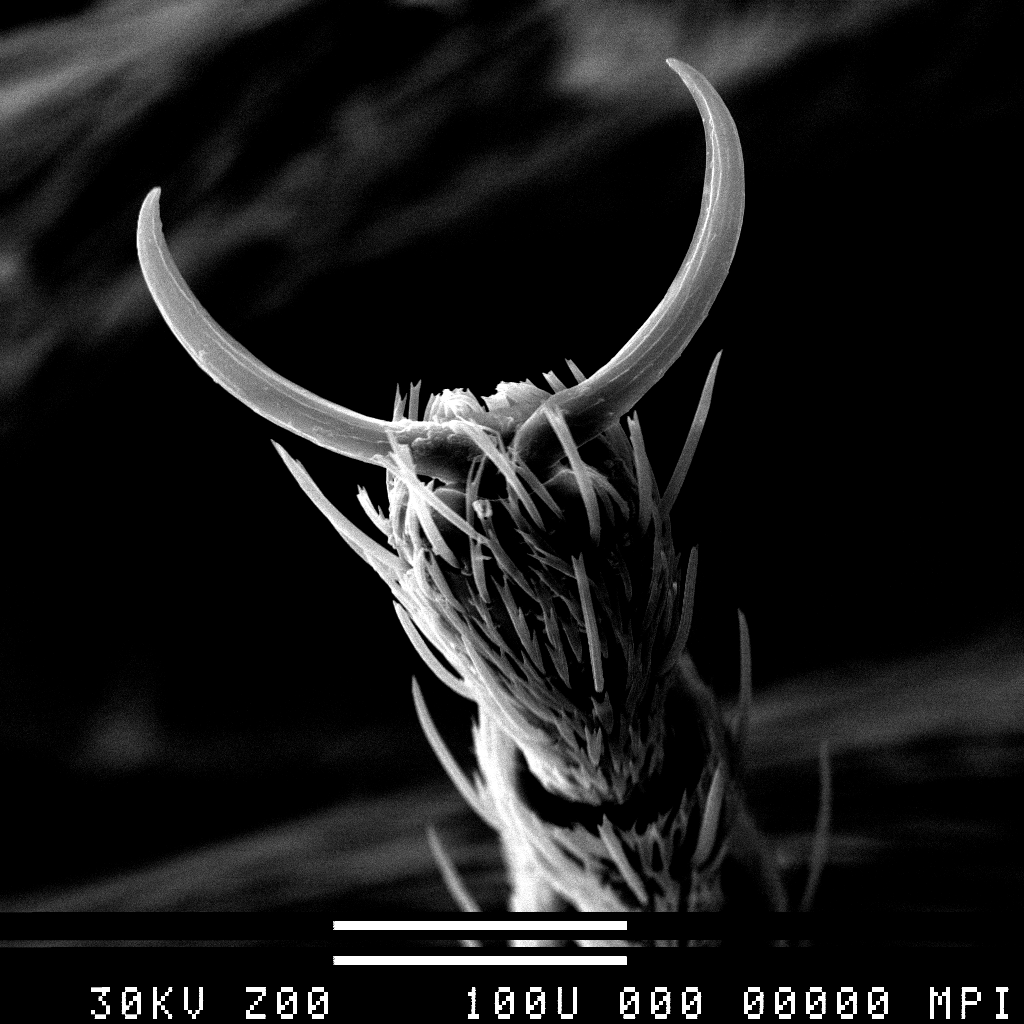
the claw

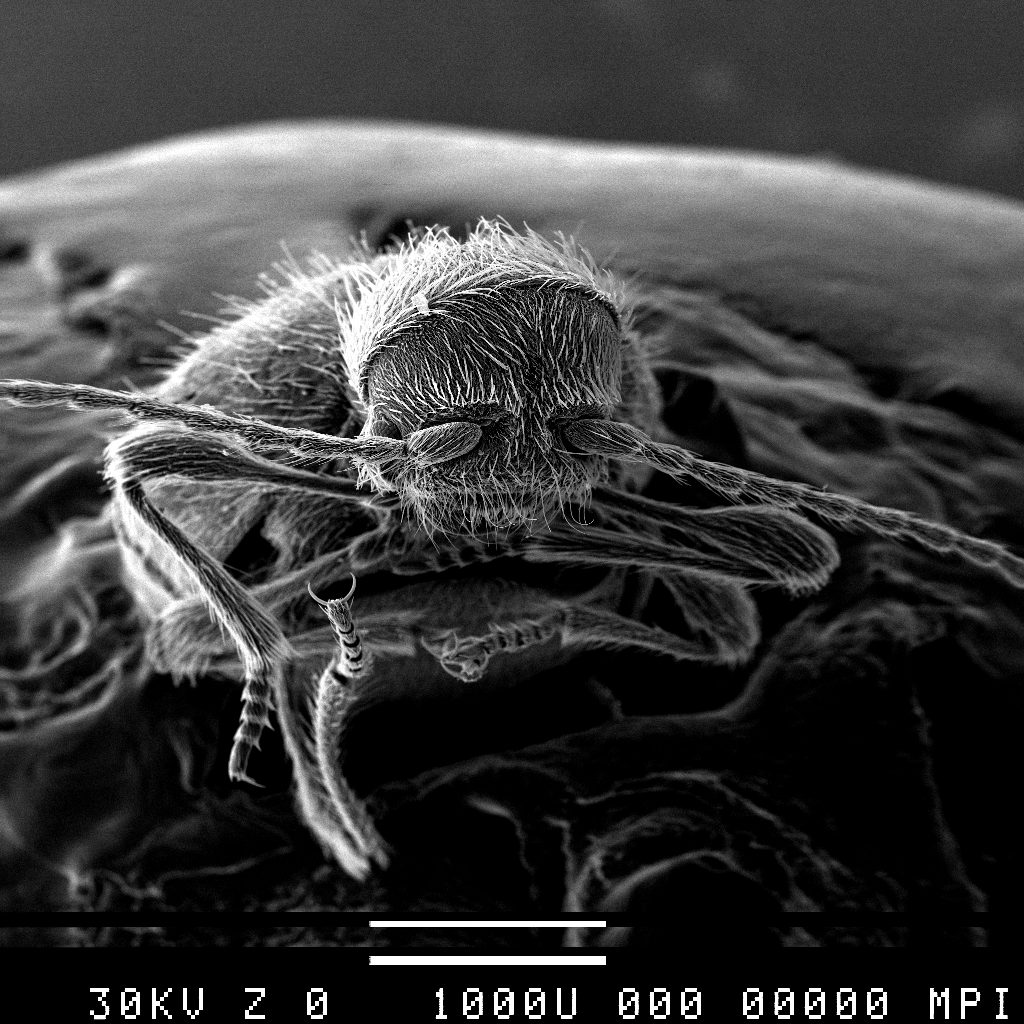
front

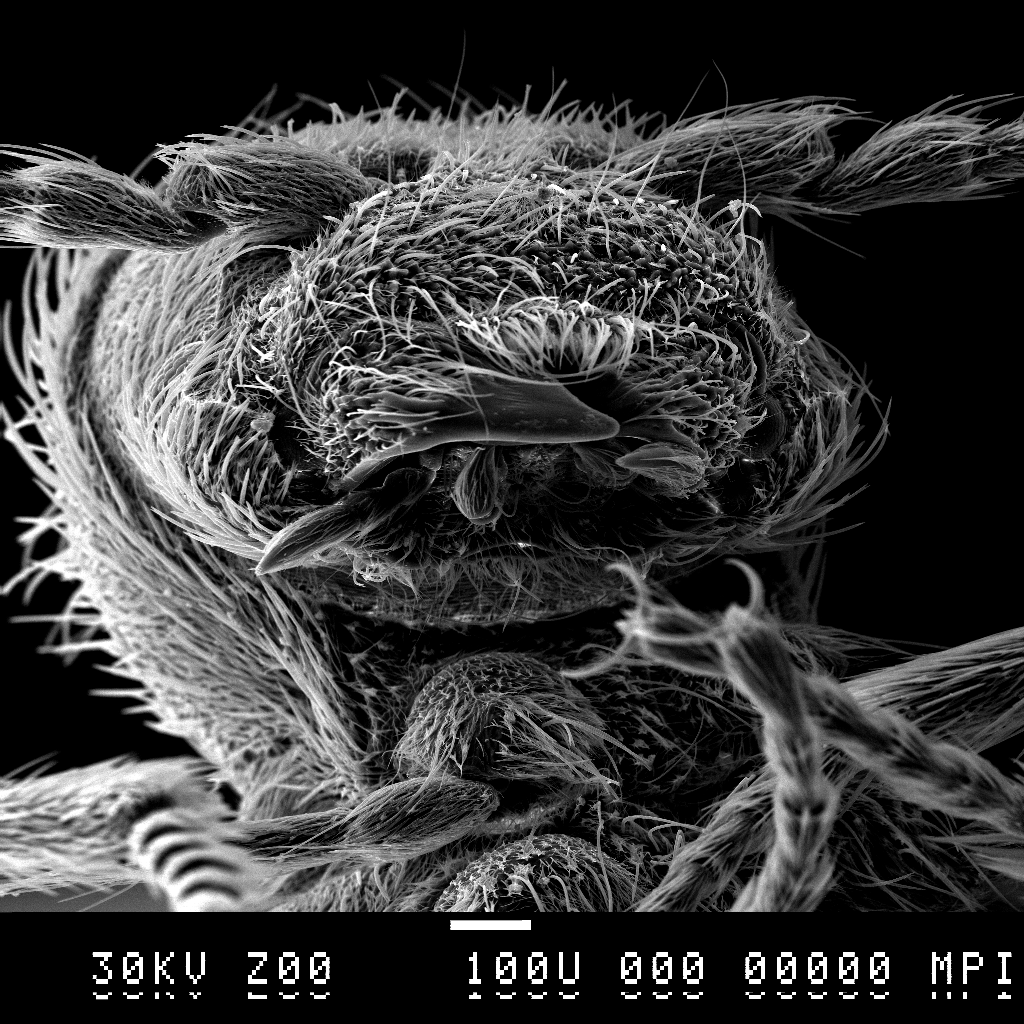
mouthpart

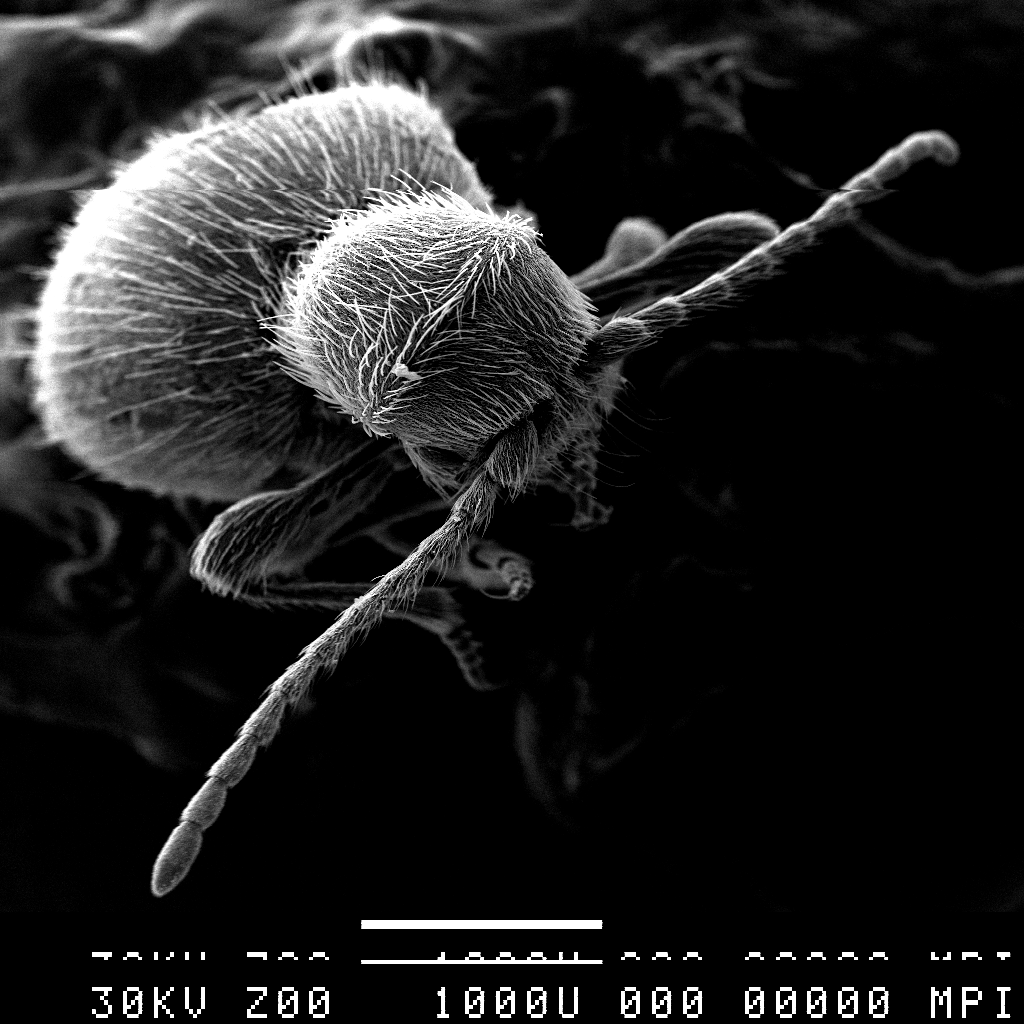
top front
