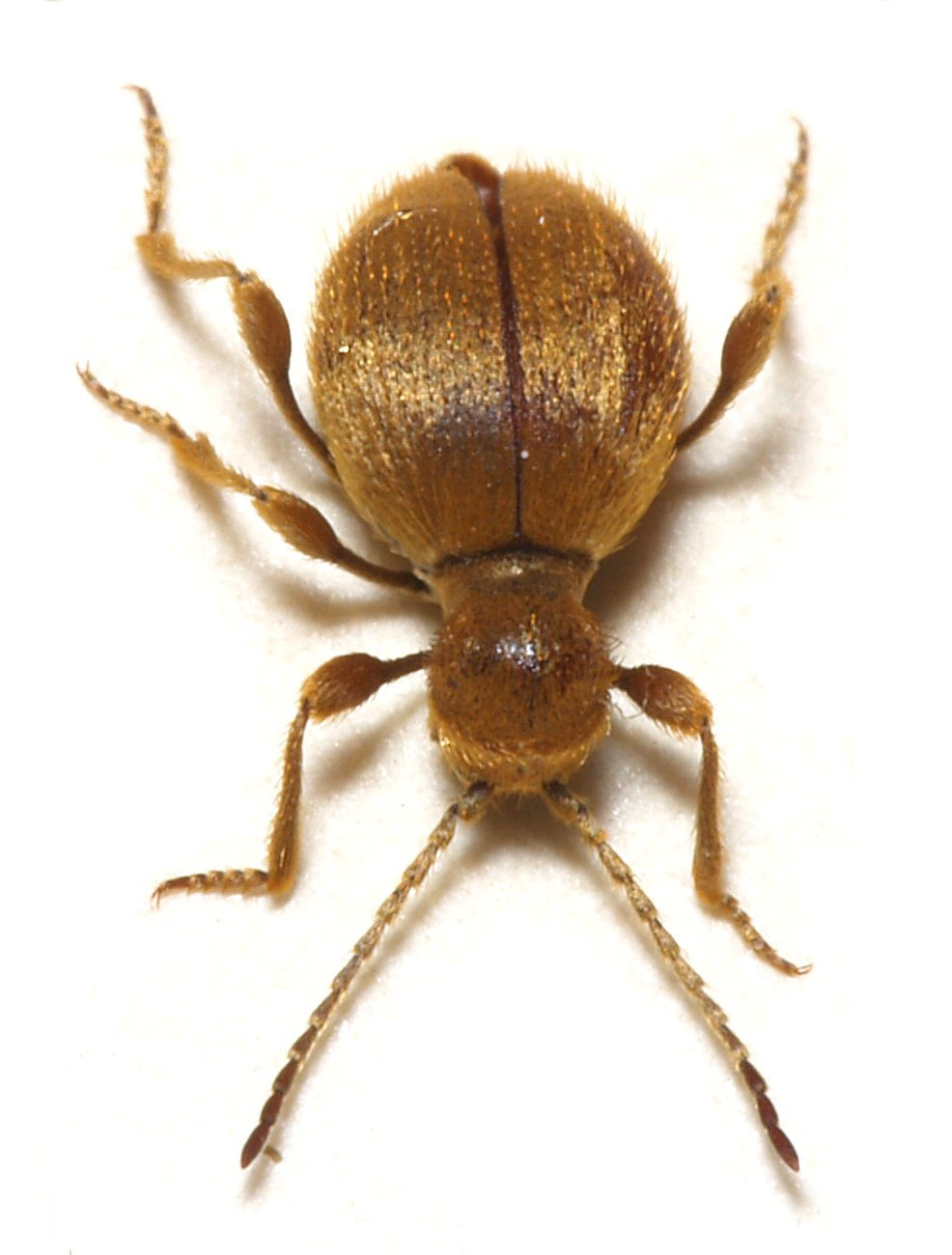
- Niptus hololeucus

Scientific classification
- Kingdom: Animalia
- Phylum: Arthropoda
- Class: Insecta
- Order: Coleoptera
- Suborder: Polyphaga
- Family: Ptinidae
- Tribe: Ptinini
- Genus: Niptus; Boieldieu, 1856

Species
- see text

= Niptus =

Genus of beetles

Niptus is a genus of beetle present in the Australian region, the Palearctic (including Europe), the Near East, the Nearctic, and North Africa.

Niptus as it is currently described is polyphyletic and researchers have suggested splitting it into two or more genera.

Species include:

- Niptus abditus
- Niptus absconditus
- Niptus abstrusus
- Niptus arcanus
- Niptus giulianii
- Niptus hololeucus – golden spider beetle
- Niptus neotomae
- Niptus sleeperi
- Niptus ventriculus
