= Niptus ventriculus =

Scientific classification
- Kingdom: Animalia
- Phylum: Arthropoda
- Clade: Pancrustacea
- Class: Insecta
- Order: Coleoptera
- Suborder: Polyphaga
- Family: Ptinidae
- Genus: Niptus
- Species: N. ventriculus

Binomial name
- Niptus ventriculus LeConte, 1859

Species of beetle

Niptus ventriculus is a species of spider beetle in the family Ptinidae. It is found in Central America and North America.
