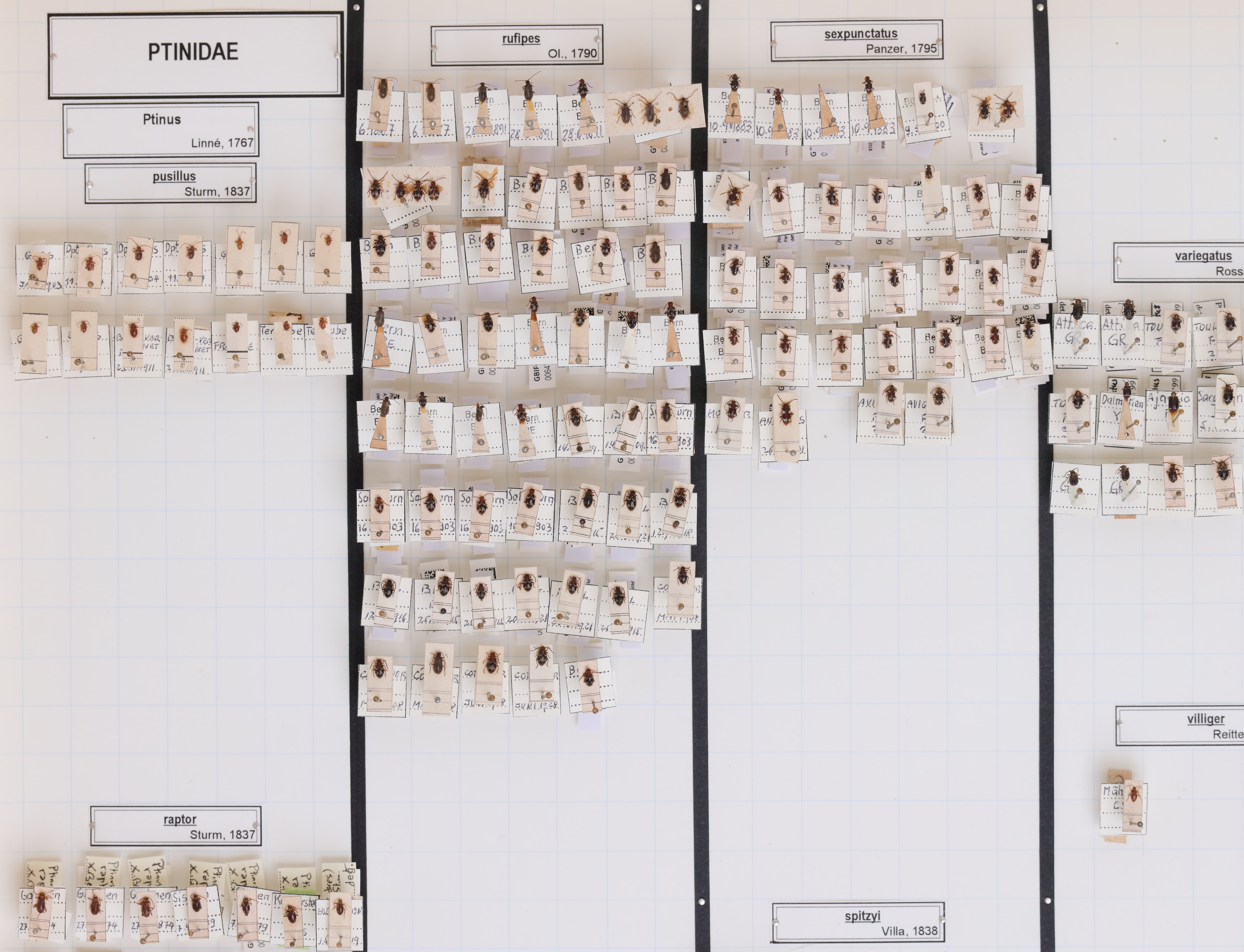

Scientific classification
- Kingdom: Animalia
- Phylum: Arthropoda
- Clade: Pancrustacea
- Class: Insecta
- Order: Coleoptera
- Suborder: Polyphaga
- Family: Ptinidae
- Subfamily: Ptininae
- Tribe: Ptinini
- Genus: Pseudeurostus; Heyden, 1906

= Pseudeurostus =

Genus of beetles

Pseudeurostus is a genus of spider beetles in the family Ptinidae. There are about seven described species in Pseudeurostus.

== Species ==
These seven species belong to the genus Pseudeurostus:

- Pseudeurostus anemophilus (Chobaut, 1901)
- Pseudeurostus apenninus (Baudi di Selve, 1874)
- Pseudeurostus bordei (Sainte-Claire Deville, 1921)
- Pseudeurostus frigidus (Boieldieu, 1854)
- Pseudeurostus hilleri (Reitter, 1877) (Japanese spider beetle)
- Pseudeurostus kelleri Brown, 1959
- Pseudeurostus submetallicus (Fairmaire, 1862)
