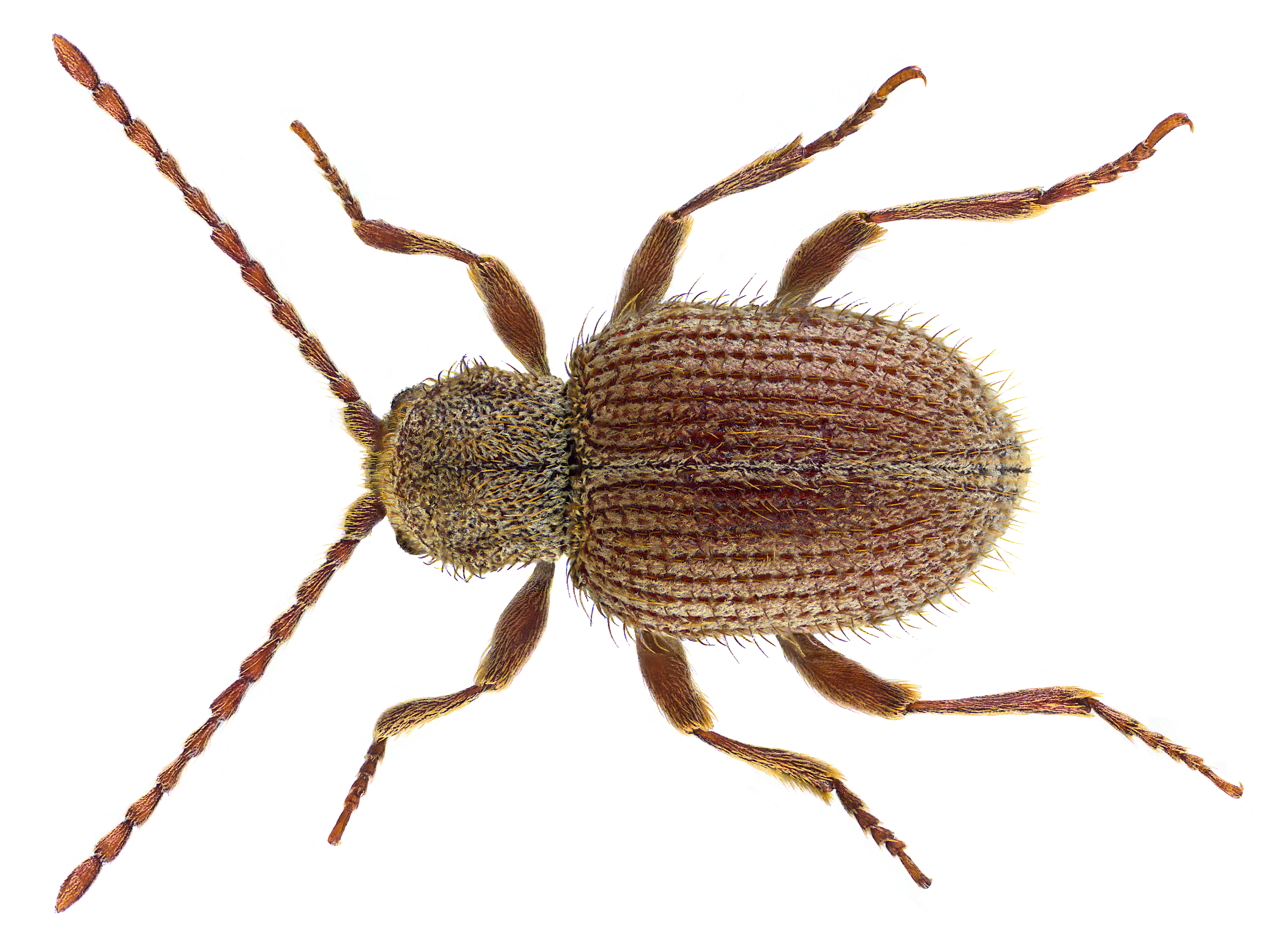
- Pseudeurostus hilleri 2.3 mm (1.7 to 3.1 mm)

Scientific classification
- Kingdom: Animalia
- Phylum: Arthropoda
- Class: Insecta
- Order: Coleoptera
- Suborder: Polyphaga
- Family: Ptinidae
- Genus: Pseudeurostus
- Species: P. hilleri

Binomial name
- Pseudeurostus hilleri (Reitter, 1877)

= Pseudeurostus hilleri =

Species of beetle

Pseudeurostus hilleri, the Japanese spider beetle, is a species of spider beetle in the family Ptinidae.
