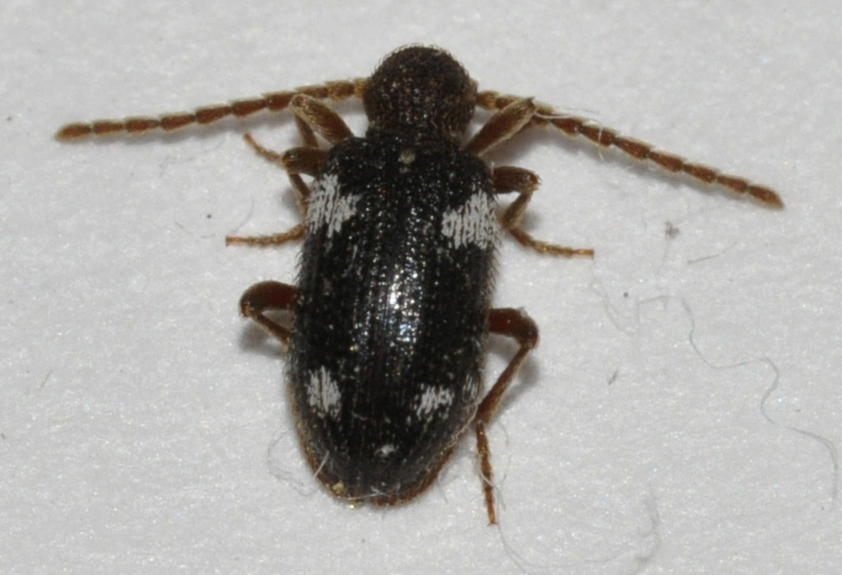
- Ptinus sexpunctatus

Scientific classification
- Kingdom: Animalia
- Phylum: Arthropoda
- Class: Insecta
- Order: Coleoptera
- Suborder: Polyphaga
- Family: Ptinidae
- Subfamily: Ptininae
- Tribe: Ptinini; Latreille, 1802

= Ptinini =

Tribe of beetles

Ptinini is a tribe of spider beetles in the family Ptinidae. There are about 18 genera and at least 120 described species in Ptinini.

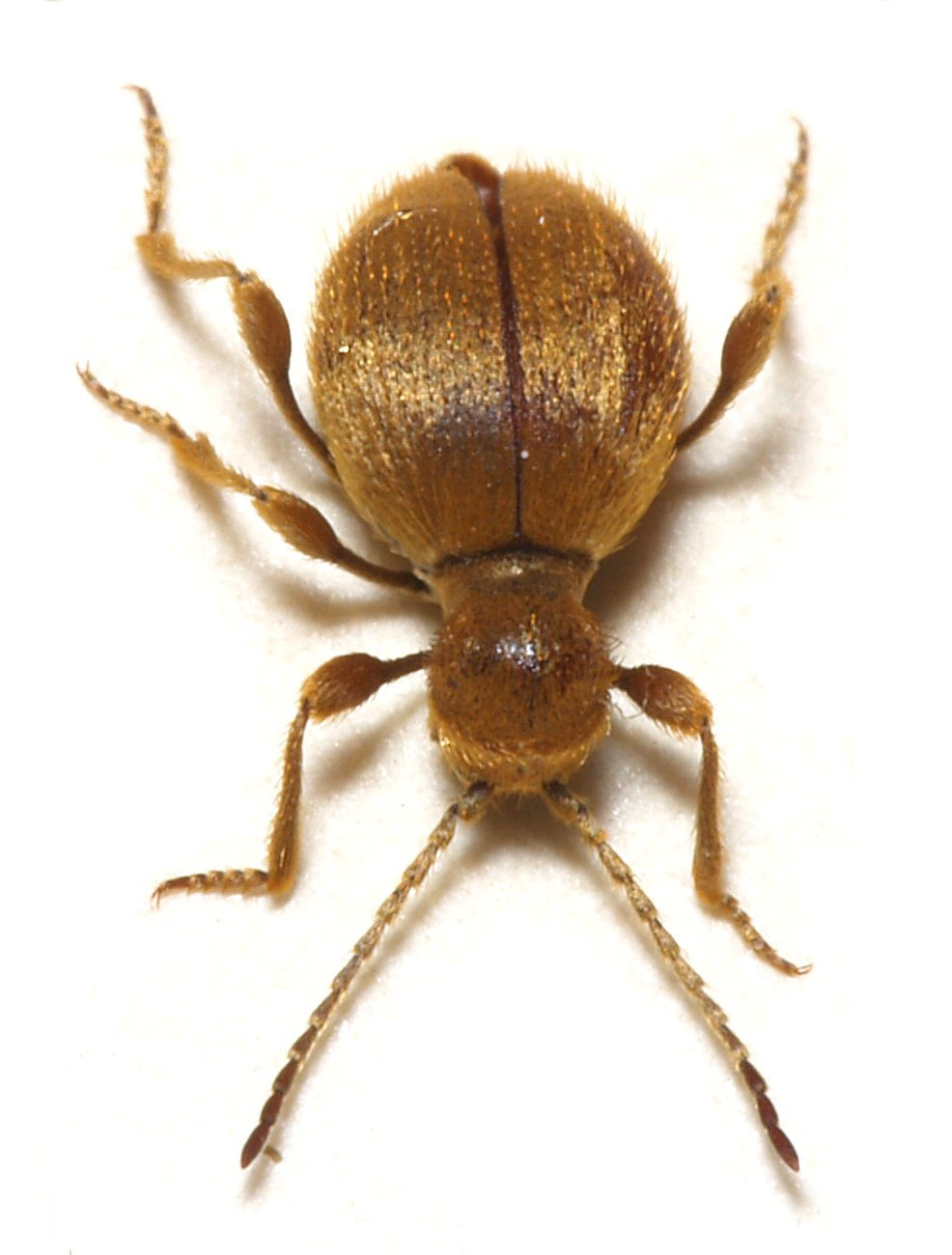
Niptus hololeucus

== Genera ==
These genera belong to the tribe Ptinini:

- Casapus Wollaston, 1862^{g}
- Cyphoniptus Bellés, 1992
- Dignomus Wollaston, 1862^{g}
- Epauloecus Mulsant & Rey, 1868^{b}
- Eurostodes Reitter, 1884^{g}
- Eurostoptinus Pic, 1895
- Eutaphrimorphus Pic, 1898
- Hanumanus Bellés, 1991
- Kedirinus Bellés, 1991^{g}
- Lapidoniptus Belles, 1981^{g}
- Myrmecoptinus Wasmann, 1916^{g}
- Niptodes Reitter, 1884^{g}
- Niptus Boieldieu, 1856^{i c g b}
- Oviedinus Bellés, 2010^{g}
- Piarus Wollaston, 1862^{g}
- Pseudeurostus Heyden, 1906^{i c g b}
- Ptinus Linnaeus, 1766^{i c g b}
- Scaleptinus Borowski, 2006

Data sources: i = ITIS, c = Catalogue of Life, g = GBIF, b = Bugguide.net
